= List of Brazilian artists =

The following is a list of Brazilian visual artists (in alphabetical order by last name) includes artists of various genres, who are notable and are either born in Brazil, of Brazilian descent or who produce works that are primarily about Brazil.

== A ==
- Abigail de Andrade (1864–1890), painter
- Zina Aita (1900–1967), Italian-Brazilian modernist painter
- Georgina de Albuquerque (1885–1962), Impressionist painter
- Aleijadinho (c. 1738–1814), sculptor and architect
- Mara Alvares (born 1948), contemporary artist
- Marina Amaral (born 1994), colorization of antique photography
- Tarsila do Amaral (1886–1973), modernist painter, draftswoman, and translator
- Abigail de Andrade (1864–1890), painter
- Amanda Maciel Antunes (fl 2000s), costume designer
- Camila Alves (born 1982), fashion designer
- Maria Auxiliadora (1935–1974), painter

== B ==
- Brígida Baltar (c. 1959–2022), video artist, performance artist, installation artist, draftsperson, and sculptor
- Artur Barrio (born 1945), conceptual artist, performance artist, installation artist
- Moysés Baumstein (1931–1991), painter, filmmaker, and holographer
- Adriana Bertini, sculptor of dresses from quality-test rejected condoms
- Bel Borba (born 1957), sculptor, graphic artist, and mosaic maker
- Francisco Brennand (1927–2019), sculptor, painter
- Romero Britto (born 1963), painter, serigrapher, and sculptor
- Guto Bussab (living), artist, photographer

== C ==
- Iberê Camargo, painter
- Sérgio de Camargo (1930–1990), sculptor
- Augusto de Campos (born 1931), writer, translator, music critic, and visual artist
- Tiago Carneiro da Cunha (born 1973), comic artist
- Carybé (1911–1997), Argentine-Brazilian artist, researcher, writer, historian and journalist
- Renato Cataldi (1909-1981), landscape painter
- Wisrah C. V. da R. Celestino (born 1989), award-winning conceptual artist living in Germany
- Gustavo Chams (born 1994), fashion photographer, designer and visual artist
- Lygia Clark (1920–1988), painter and installation artist
- Everaldo Coelho (born 1978), graphic designer and illustrator
- Edgard Cognat (1919–1994), painter and sculptor
- Alexandre da Cunha (born 1969), Brazilian-born British sculptor, assemblage artist

== D ==
- Marcello Dantas, digital artist
- Liliane Dardot (born 1946), painter
- Djanira da Motta e Silva (1914–1979), painter, illustrator, engraver

== E ==
- Iran do Espirito Santo (born 1963), sculptor

== F ==
- Hércules Florence (1804–1879), Monegasque-Brazilian painter and inventor
- Rodrigo Franzão (born 1982), mixed media and textile artist

== G ==
- Anna Bella Geiger (born 1933), multidisciplinary artist, educator
- Olívia Guedes Penteado (1872–1934), art patron, activist
- Sonia Gomes (born 1948), contemporary sculptor
- Carmela Gross (born 1946), visual artist

== K ==
- Eduardo Kac (born 1962), Brazilian-born American contemporary multidisciplinary artist

== L ==
- Carlos Latuff (born 1968), political cartoonist
- Giselda Leirner, writer, illustrator, and painter

== M ==
- Anita Malfatti (1889–1964), artist
- Denis Mandarino (born 1964), composer, artist and writer
- Cinthia Marcelle (born 1974), contemporary artist
- Cildo Meireles (born 1948), conceptual artist
- Vik Muniz (born 1961), photographer and sculptor
- Eduardo Munniz, actor

== N ==
- Naza (born 1955), painter
- Paulo Nazareth (born 1977), multimedia artist from Minas Gerais
- Lúcio Noeman (1913/15–?), sculptor
- Lucia Nogueira (1950–1998)

== O ==
- Hélio Oiticica (1937–1980)
- Alexandre Orion, street artist, multimedia artist and muralist
- Os Gêmeos (born 1974), art duo and twins, muralists

== P ==
- Shirley Paes Leme (born 1955), printmaker, sculptor, and educator
- Abraham Palatnik (1928–2020), abstract artist and inventor, including kinechromatic art
- José Pancetti (1902–1958), painter
- Lygia Pape (1927–2004), sculptor, engraver, and filmmaker
- Letícia Parente (1930–1991), video artist
- Regina Parra (born 1984), contemporary painting
- Wanda Pimentel (1943–2019), painter
- Silvia Poloto, Brazilian-born multidisciplinary visual artist, electrical engineer, based in California

== R ==
- Eduardo Recife (born 1980), collagist, illustrator, and typographer
- Rachel Rosalen, video art, performance art, telematics, interactive video installations, and new media
- Sergio Rossetti Morosini, scholar, artist and author

== S ==
- Neide Sá (born 1940), painter
- Gretta Sarfaty (fl 1970s), Greek-Brazilian painter and multimedia artist
- Katie van Scherpenberg (1940–2025), painter
- Beto Shwafaty (born 1977), conceptual artist, and art critic
- Francisco da Silva, painter
- Regina Silveira (born 1939), painter
- Luzia Simons (born 1953), painter
- Camila Soato (born 1985), oil painter
- Nathália Suellen (born 1989), digital artist

== T ==
- Nair de Teffé (1886–1981), painter, cartoonist, singer and pianist
- Celeida Tostes (1929–1995), sculptor, drawing teacher
- Iracema Trevisan (born 1982), fashion designer
- Isabelle Tuchband (born 1968), plastic artist
- Yara Tupynambá (born 1932), painter

== V ==
- Adriana Varejão (born 1964), painter, drawer, sculptor and installation artist
- Katie van Scherpenberg (1940–2025), painter, architect
- Cybèle Varela (born 1943), mixed-media artist
- Nicolina Vaz de Assis (1874–1941), sculptor
- Guy Veloso (born 1969), documentary photographer
- Fernanda Viégas (born 1971), graphical designer
- Mary Vieira (1927–2001), sculptor

== X ==
- Márcia X (1959–2005), performance artist
- Niobe Xandó (1915–2010), artist

== Z ==
- Carla Zaccagnini (born 1973), painter and curator

== See also ==
- Brazilian art
- List of Brazilian women artists
