= List of Brazilian women artists =

This is a list of women artists who were born in Brazil or whose artworks are closely associated with that country.

== A ==
- Zina Aita (1900–1967), Italian-Brazilian modernist painter
- Georgina de Albuquerque (1885–1962), Impressionist painter
- Mara Alvares (born 1948), contemporary artist
- Marina Amaral (born 1994), known for colorization of historical photographs
- Tarsila do Amaral (1886–1973), modernist painter
- Abigail de Andrade (1864–1890), painter
- Amanda Maciel Antunes (fl 2000s), costume designer
- Camila Alves (born 1982), fashion designer
- Maria Auxiliadora (1935–1974), painter

== B ==
- Brígida Baltar (c.1959–2022), visual artist
- Ladjane Bandeira (1927–1999), painter, art director
- Tatiana Blass (born 1979), contemporary artist
- Vera Chaves Barcellos (born 1938), visual artist
- Lia Menna Barreto (born 1959), painter
- Lenora de Barros (born 1953), contemporary artist
- Edith Behring (1916–1996), painter
- Alice Brill (1920–2013), German-Brazilian painter and photographer
- Elisa Bracher (born 1965), sculptor

== C ==
- Carlota De Camargo Nascimento (1904–1974), sculptor
- Marina Camargo (born 1980), multimedia artist
- Maria Cândido (born 1939), artist working with clay
- Josely Carvalho (born 1942), multimedia artist
- Leda Catunda (born 1961), painter, engraver, educator
- Catia Chien (fl 2007), illustrator
- Sandra Cinto (born 1968), contemporary artist
- Lygia Clark (1920–1988), painter, installation artist
- Mariza Dias Costa (1952–2019), cartoonist
- Tereza Costa Rêgo (1929–2020), painter

== D ==
- Liliane Dardot (born 1946), painter
- Djanira da Motta e Silva (1914–1979), painter, illustrator, engraver

== E ==
- Sonia Ebling (1918–2006), sculptor
- Laura Erber (born 1979), video artist, writer

== F ==
- Bea Feitler (1938–1982), book cover and catalogue designer
- Julieta de França (1870–1951), sculptor
- Angela Freiberger (born 1953), sculptor, performance artist
- Iole de Freitas (born 1945), sculptor, engraver, installation artist

== G ==
- Anna Bella Geiger (born 1933), multidisciplinary artist, educator
- Olívia Guedes Penteado (1872–1934), art patron, activist
- Sonia Gomes (born 1948), sculptor
- Carmela Gross (born 1946), visual artist

== H ==
- Eli Heil (1929–2017), painter, sculptor, ceramist

== J ==
- Adriana Janacópulos (1897–c.1978), sculptor

== K ==
- Renina Katz (1925–2025), printmaker, painter
- Eleonore Koch (1926–2018), painter, sculptor

== L ==
- Felícia Leirner (1904–1996), sculptor
- Sheila Leirner (born 1948), curator, art critic, activist
- Juliana Cerqueira Leite (born 1981), sculptor
- Ju Loyola (born 1979), cartoonist, illustrator
- Renata Lucas (born 1971), painter
- Mariannita Luzzati (born 1963), painter, engraver, video artist

== M ==
- Solange Magalhães (born 1939), French-born Brazilian painter
- Anita Malfatti (1889–1964), modernist painter
- Cinthia Marcelle (born 1974), multimedia artist
- Maria Martins (1894–1973), sculptor
- Sylvia Martins (born 1956), painter
- Lia Menna Barreto (born 1959), sculptor
- Alessandra Meskita (fl 2007), fashion designer
- Alice Miceli (born 1980), video artist
- Beatriz Milhazes (born 1960), painter
- Djanira da Motta e Silva (1914–1979), painter, illustrator, printmaker

== N ==
- Ananda Nahu (born 1985), street artist
- Naza (born 1955), abstract painter
- Constancia Nery (born 1936), naive art painter
- Rivane Neuenschwander (born 1967), contemporary artist
- Teresa Nicolao (born 1928), painter, set designer
- Lucia Nogueira (1950–1998), painter

== O ==
- Tomie Ohtake (1913–2015), Japanese-Brazilian painter, sculptor, print maker
- Christina Oiticica (born 1951), painter
- Lydia Okumura (born 1948), abstract painter
- Camila Oliveira Fairclough (born 1979), visual artist
- Fayga Ostrower (1920–2001), Polish-born Brazilian engraver, painter, educator

== P ==
- Ana Maria Pacheco (born 1943), painter, sculptor, now in the UK
- Shirley Paes Leme (born 1955), printmaker, sculptor, and educator
- Lygia Pape (1927–2004), sculptor, engraver, filmmaker
- Letícia Parente (1930–1991), video artist
- Regina Parra (born 1981), contemporary artist
- Rosana Paulino (born 1967), visual artist, educator and curator
- Marianne Peretti (1927–2022), French-Brazilian sculptor, muralist and stained glass artist
- Wanda Pimentel (1943–2019), painter
- Luiza Prado (born 1988), multidisciplinary artist

== Q ==
- Anna Letycia Quadros (1929–2018), painter

== R ==
- Madalena dos Santos Reinbolt (1919–1977), painter, textile artist

== S ==
- Neide Sá (born 1940), painter
- Gretta Sarfaty (fl 1970s), Greek-Brazilian painter and multimedia artist
- Katie van Scherpenberg (1940–2025), painter
- Regina Silveira (born 1939), painter
- Luzia Simons (born 1953), painter
- Camila Soato (born 1985), oil painter
- Nathália Suellen (born 1989), digital artist

== T ==
- Amelia Toledo (1926–2017), sculptor, painter
- Clarissa Tossin (born 1973), painter
- Celeida Tostes (1929–1995), sculptor, ceramist
- Iracema Trevisan (born 1982), fashion designer
- Isabelle Tuchband (born 1968), plastic artist
- Yara Tupynambá (born 1932), painter

== V ==
- Adriana Varejão (born 1964), painter, drawer, sculptor and installation artist
- Cybèle Varela (born 1943), painter, video-artist, photographer
- Nicolina Vaz de Assis (1874–1941), sculptor
- Fernanda Viégas (born 1971), graphical designer
- Mary Vieira (1927–2001), sculptor

== W ==
- Hilde Weber (1913–1994), cartoonist, illustrator
- Bertha Worms (1868–1937), French-Brazilian painter

== X ==
- Márcia X (1959–2005), performance artist
- Niobe Xandó (1915–2010), painter

== Z ==
- Carla Zaccagnini (born 1973), painter and curator
