= Maria Nepomuceno =

Brazilian artist

- Born: 1976 (48); Rio de Janeiro
- Education: Escola de Artes Visuais do Parque Lage (1990–1994)
- Alma mater: University of Rio de Janeiro
- Movement: Surrealism, Abstract Expressionism, Neo-Concrete, feminist art and Contemporary Art

Maria Nepomuceno (1976) is a Brazilian artist from Rio de Janeiro. Nepomuceno is a contemporary sculptor and installation artist who's known for her knitted sculptural works.

== Early life and education ==
Maria was born and raised in Rio de Janeiro. She studied art at Escola de Artes Visuais do Parque Lage when she was 14 and eventually studied at University of Rio de Janeiro for her industrial design and scenography degree. She also went back to Escola de Artes Visuais Parque Lage to study Art and Philosophy for a year in 2003.

== Work ==
Her artistic work is based upon traditional weaving techniques using colourful rope and beads that is inspired by her Latin American roots. She implements spirals as a central image in her works which, in her words, "helps create a transition from the past to the present". Her contemporary designs also incorporates natural elements that resonates with Nepomuceno.

She started experimenting with these styles in the early 2000s. Her neo-concretism approach stems from many artist including Lygia Clark, Hélio Oiticica and Ernesto Neto. Hammocks, beads, and tubes are also recurring themes in her artworks.

=== Collaborations ===
In recent years, she has worked with indigenous Huni Kuin people to develop her weaving techniques. She also collaborated with a local artist studio group for her installation, Tempo para Respirar.

== Awards ==
She has received multiple awards including the Marcantonio Vilaça Acquisition Prize (2013), the Proposições Poéticas (Poetic Propositions) (2012) and an Acquisition Prize from the Mueseum of Modern Art, Brazil (2006)

== Selected exhibitions ==
- Respiro, A Gentil Carioca, Rio de Janeiro, (2006)
- Drifting, Steve Turner Contemporary Gallery, Los Angeles, (2009)
- Always in a Spiral, Magasin III Museum for Contemporary Art, Stockholm, (2010)
- Pulso, Eva Klabin Foundation, Rio de Janeiro, (2012)ref name="CV"/>
- Universo em expansão, Baró Galeria, Jardins, (2015)
- Cosmic Teta, Barbican Centre, London, (2016)
- Afetosyntesis, Stavanger Art Museum, Norway (2017)
- Refloresta!, Portico Library, Manchester, (2021)
- Big Bang Boca, Instituto Artium de Cultura, São Paulo, (2023)
- Expiro, Victoria Miro, Venice, (2024)
