= Marcello Dantas =

Brazilian artist

Marcello Dantas is a Brazilian artist.

== Biography ==
Marcelo Dantas studied diplomacy in Brasília, history of art in Florence and graduated in Film and Television at New York University where he also did a post-graduate extension in Interactive Telecommunications He has assumed the role of producer, creator, designer and curator in many initiatives.

He has curated exhibits for Bill Viola, Gary Hill, Jenny Holzer, Shirin Neshat, Tunga, Laura Vinci, Angelo Venosa and Arthur Omar in Brazil. He has successfully created historical exhibitions such as 50 Years of TV and More, Anos Luz (Light Years – 100 years of Cinema), Getulio; CineCaverna (A Travel through Brazilian Pre-History), Resonancias de Brasil among others. He has produced operas by Peter Greenaway and La Fura dels Baus.

His achievements include Best documentary awards in the Bienalle Internationale du Film Sur L'Art - Centre Georges Pompidou in Paris, in the FestRio, and the International Film & TV Festival of New York, as well as exhibition design awards at SEGD (Society for Environmental Graphic Design), Art Director's Club of New York and IDEA. In Brazil he has created events and exhibitions in most of the major cultural venues. In 1990, he created Magnetoscópio, a production company for films and cultural events, specializing in the convergence of art, history and technology. Throughout his 30-year career he created more than 250 exhibitions, 15 museums and 12 documentaries.

He was the artistic director of the Museum of the Portuguese Language during its implementation 2001–2006. In 2006 he opened PeléStation in Berlin and a sequence of exhibitions on Anish Kapoor in Brazil. In 2007, Lusa, the Portuguese matriz opened at CCBB in Rio, São Paulo and Brasilia and NO AR, an exhibition about communication in Porto Alegre for Grupo RBS, this exhibition was awarded the Top of Marketing 2008 for Culture. Also in 2007, Mr Dantas was the interior designer for Octavio Café's flagship store which earned him the IDEA award in Brazil for Best Ambient Design. In 2008 Dantas opened a landmark exhibition about Bossa Nova called Bossa na Oca in the OCA pavilion in São Paulo for Banco Itaú.
