= Silvia Poloto =

Brazilian artist

- Born: São Paulo, Brazil
- Education: University of São Paulo; Fundação Getúlio Vargas
- Occupations: Educator, artist
- Known for: Mixed-media art
- Website: Official website

Silvia Poloto is a Brazilian-born American visual artist and trained electrical engineer whose multidisciplinary practice includes photography, sculpture, painting, and video art.

== Education ==
She was born in São Paulo, Brazil and immigrated to San Francisco, California, in 1992. She earned a B.S. in electrical engineering from University of São Paulo.

She earned her M.B.A. at the Fundação Getúlio Vargas (Getulio Vargas Foundation) in São Paulo.

== Career ==
From 1996 to 1999, she worked as an instructor's assistant in the Sculpture Department at City College of San Francisco. During that period, she also worked as a welder at 3D Studios in Oakland and an art instructor in mixed media at the Associated Students of the University of California Art Studio at the University of California, Berkeley.

Her work has been shown in exhibitions in the United States and internationally, including in countries such as the United Arab Emirates, France, Spain, Italy, Singapore, Romania, Bulgaria, Greece, and China. In the San Francisco Bay Area, her art has been included in exhibitions at venues such as the Yerba Buena Center for the Arts, the SFMOMA Artist's Gallery, the Triton Museum of Art, the Italian American Museum, and the M. H. de Young Memorial Museum, where she held an artist residency in 2001. Her work is part of various institutional, corporate, and private collections in the United States and abroad.

== Creative themes ==
Poloto’s work is characterized by an intuitive and process-oriented approach, often combining multiple media such as painting, photography, sculpture, and video. She frequently engages with formal contrasts, including color versus monochrome, structure versus fluidity, and abstraction versus figuration. Her compositions reflect an interest in dualities and visual tension, as well as the material properties of her chosen media.

Several of her series incorporate mythological and symbolic imagery, drawing on archetypes to explore themes related to identity, personal transformation, and emotional experience. In some recent works, Poloto has limited her palette to black and white, focusing on form, texture, and spatial relationships. Across different bodies of work, she maintains an emphasis on experimentation and the physical act of making.

== See also ==
- List of Brazilian artists
- Contemporary art
