= Shirley Paes Leme =

Brazilian visual artist (born 1955)

- Born: Shirley Paes–Leme; 1955 (age 69–70); Cachoeira Dourada, Goiás, Brazil
- Other names: Shirley Paes–Leme Paiva–Arantes
- Occupation(s): Sculptor, printmaker, designer, teacher

Shirley Paes Leme Paiva Arantes (born 1955) is a Brazilian sculptor, printmaker, designer and teacher. Her artwork has been shown in Brazil, and internationally.

== Biography ==
Shirley Paes Leme was born in 1955 in Cachoeira Dourada, Goiás, Brazil.

From 1975 until 1978, she studied at the Federal University of Minas Gerais, under artist Amílcar de Castro. She also began her master's degree at the University of Arizona, in Tucson; as well as studied at the San Francisco Art Institute, the University of California, Berkeley (M.A. degree 1983), and John F. Kennedy University (M.F.A. degree 1986).

Paes Leme taught art classes in her early career at the Federal University of Uberlândia (UFU) from 1979 to 1982. She held her first solo exhibition in 1981, at the Cultural Foundation of the Federal District, Brasília. In 1992, Paes Leme's work was included in the Biennale Internationale de Lausanne, an international contemporary textile exhibition in Lausanne, Switzerland.

== See also ==
- List of Brazilian women artists
