= Neide Sá =

Neide Dias de Sá (born November 2, 1940) is a Brazilian artist who spent a big portion of her life (about twenty years) teaching children art starting in the 1960s. Together with three others, she began an art movement in 1967 known as Poema/Processo. This art movement questioned the restraints that came with using words and replaced words with pictures. She did this years before pursuing a formal education in art. She did not earn her degree in graphic design until 1980.

== Biography ==
She was born in Rio de Janeiro, Brazil in 1940 and eventually married her husband Álvaro de Sá who was a poet. With Sá, Álvaro de Sá (her husband), Wlademir Dias-Pino, and Moacy Cirne, they founded the Poema/Processo art movement in 1967 and ended in 1972 due to persecution by the U.S.-backed Brazilian dictatorship. Together, the founders of the Poema/Processo movement called into question the power of words. They did so by replacing words with pictures, paintings, drawings, etc. These concepts of symbols and geometric shapes replacing words would later be reflected in her future work. Also reflected in her later work is having interactive exhibits and pieces in which the observers were able to participate. She began her series Artist's Book with a piece called Onomatopeias. This piece would lead her to eventually create over 150 pieces to add to her Artist's Book. Later, her works would shift from interactive exhibits to geometric sculptures supported by the force of magnetism. She eventually went on to put on her own solo shows like Nós e nós which made its debut in Savona, Italy, in the Galleria II Brendale. Due to times of strict U.S.-supported dictatorship in Brazil, which censored and limited everyone living under this regime, artists such as Neide Sá and many others used their work to indirectly express what this strict censorship wouldn't allow them to. is reflected in some of her work such as A Corda. She did not begin any formal art training until later in her life. She had a begun her Poema/Processo art movement in 1967 and she did not begin her art training until the mid-1970s. She didn't official get her degree in art education until 1980 when she graduated from the Pontifícia Universidade Católica do Rio de Janeiro.

== Education ==
=== Teaching ===
She spent twenty years teaching art classes to children starting in the 1960s. She spent her 30s and 40s in Rio de Janeiro studying at the Escola de Artes Visuais do Parque Lage as well as the Museu de Arte Moderna do Rio de Janeiro. There, she studied painting and printmaking and eventually got her degree in graphic design in 1980.

=== Escola de Artes Visuais do Parque Lage and Museu de Arte Moderna do Rio de Janeiro ===
Here at the Escola de Artes Visuais do Parque Lage as well as the Museu de Arte Moderna do Rio de Janeiro is where she studied printmaking and painting. She attended both of these from the 1970s until the 1980s.

=== Pontifïcia Universidade Católica do Rio de Janeiro ===
While attending the Pontifïcia Universidade Católica do Rio de Janeiro she graduated and got her degree in art education in 1980. This came about 20 years later after she started teaching art to children.

=== Instituto Metodista Bennett ===
In 1983, three years after getting her degree in art education, she was able to complete an art education postgraduate program. The Instituto Metodista Bennett is located in Rio de Janeiro just like Pontifïcia Universidade Católica do Rio de Janeiro, Museu de Arte Moderna do Rio de Janeiro.

== Art movements ==
=== Poema/Processo ===
Sá is a founding member of the Poema/Processo art movement that originated in Brazil. She describes her work as "visual poems". Artists and poets such as Lygia Pape, Judith Lauand, Haroldo de Campos, Augusto de Campos got together in 1957 and hosted what is known as the Exposición Nacional de Arte Concreta. This exposition in which artists, writers, and poets came together to create, paved the way for the Poema/Processo artists to come about. The artists that created this movement include Neide Sá, Wlademir Dias Pino, Moacy Cirne, and Álvaro de Sá. This movement popped up in multiple locations at the same time: In Rio de Janeiro and Natal. This Poema/Processo movement lasted 5 years starting in 1967 and ending in 1972. The aim of Poema/Processo was to replace the verbal structure of poems with other physical mediums. These mediums include pictures, different geometric shapes, cuts and bends in pages and other kinds of graphics.

== Artwork ==
=== Artist's book ===
Sá's most prevalent medium is the artist's book. She tends to incorporate many minimalist geometric shapes. In total, Sá has produced over 150 of these minimal, geometric pieces.

==== Onomatopeias ====
The first of her over 150 piece collection began with a project called Onomatopeias in 1969. The Onomatopeias was the first collection to be added to her signature artist's book.

==== Livros vazados ====
Her works created in her series "Onomatopeias" influenced her to create a new series called Livros vazados, which, when translated from Portuguese to English translates to "hollow books". This work was created in the early 1970s. These hollow books" are characterized by geometric shapes that are missing from missing from sheets of paper. These sheets of paper, when manipulated in a certain way can become something completely different. Allowing the observer to manipulate the pages and books however they please.

==== Circunferências and Prismas ====
While creating her Livros vazados collection, she was simultaneously working on a project she called Prismas (translating to "Prisms) and Circunferências (translating to "Circumferences"), both of which were created in 1973. These two series are related as they both include interactive pieces made up by metal disks supporting elements through the force of magnetism.

=== A Corda ===
A Corda (or "The Rope"), 1967. Consists of a clothes line strung from one end of the room to the other. Along the clothes line are different types of media attached to the line through the use of clothes pins. Hanging from these clothes pins attached to the clothes line are different pictures, painting and drawings. Not only drawings and paintings, Neide Sá also includes magazine cut outs with phrases such as "LIBERDADE", "HIPPIES TEM MAIS FLÔRES", "Oriente" and many others.

=== Transparência ===
Transparência (or "transparency") was created in 1969. This consisted of a clear, cube shaped object with symbols on the outside. Acrylic and silk screen. Fairly small made up of 7.875 inch screens all the way around.

=== Reflexível ===
Sá's Reflexível (or "Reflexive") and was created in 1977. This work is described as "semiological poem" because it defined and categorized body movements are reflected over mirrored surfaces. This interactive piece called for guests who went to view it to walk along a path. However, there are a set of rules guests had to follow. For example, in order to step on a circle, they had to step on the circular shapes using only their heels, in order to step on the triangular shapes, guests were only allowed to step on it with the side of their foot, and in order to step on the rectangular shapes, guests were only able to use their toes. These rules led to strange body movements and displayed hidden potential in body movements.

== Exhibitions ==
1980 Neide Sá: Livros-objeto, Galleria Il Brandale, Savona, Italy

1985 Neide Sá: Livros-objeto, Galeria Macunaíma, Rio de Janeiro

1993 Neide Sá: Livros-objeto, Galería Casa Jove, Barcelona

1998 Neide Dias de Sá: Revelação dos rastros, Museu de Arte, Porto Alegre, Brazil

2000 A ordem do caos, Museu Nacional de Belas Artes, Rio de Janeiro
