= Lia Menna Barreto =

Brazilian studio artist (born 1959)

- Born: Lia Mascarenhas Menna Barreto; March 3, 1959 (age 67)
- Education: Universidade do Rio Grande do Sul
- Spouse: Mauro Fuke
- Website: lia-mennabarreto.blogspot.com

Lia Mascarenhas Menna Barreto (born March 3, 1959, in Rio de Janeiro) is a Brazilian studio artist currently based in Rio Grande do Sul.

== Biography ==
Barreto was born in Rio de Janeiro on March 3, 1959. She spent her childhood in São Paulo, where she lived until she was 13 years old. In the 1970s she moved to Rio Grande do Sul where she completed her formal education, graduating from the Universidade Federal do Rio Grande do Sul in 1985. During the 1990s she lived in the United States, working on a studio at Stanford University.

Barreto currently lives in Eldorado do Sul, Rio Grande do Sul with her husband, the Brazilian artist Mauro Fuke and their daughter.

== Education ==
Between 1975 and 1978 Barreto took art and drawing courses at the Ateliê Livre da Prefeitura de Porto Alegre. In 1984, she studied painting and drawing with Luiz Paulo Baravelli (1942) and Rubens Gerchman (1942 – 2008) respectively. She received her Bachelor of Arts in design from the Universidade Federal do Rio Grande do Sul in 1985.

== Career ==
In 1985, the same year of her graduation, Barreto the Museu de Arte do Rio Grande do Sul (Margs) in Porto Alegre featured her first solo exhibit and in 1988 her work was featured in the 10º Salão Nacional de Artes Plásticas at the Fundação Nacional de Arte (Funarte). During the 1990' - after several pitches to galleries in São Paulo and in Rio de Janeiro - Lia was taken on by the Thomas Cohn Arte Contemporânea gallery in Rio, the same gallery credited with launching the careers of Leda Catunda and Leonilson. The Thomas Cohn gallery featured her first exhibit outside of Porto Alegre.

Following her national recognition, between 1993 and 1994 Lia lived as fellow in Stanford University with a grant awarded by the International Fellowship in the Visual Arts. In 1997 she exhibited her work at the 6ª Bienal de Havana, at the Biennial of Los Angeles and at the 1ª Bienal de Artes Visuais do Mercosul, consolidating her international career.

Several galleries have featured solo exhibitions of Lia Menna Barreto's work. In Sao Paulo, Brazil, the Galeria Fortes Vilaça has hosted her [ Projeto 2001 ], Origem do Afeto and assorted other works in the last decade. In Porto Alegre, her work has appeared in the Diário de uma Boneca, the Exercícios Afetivos (MARGS), the Galeria Iberê Camargo and the Galeria Arte e Fato. In Rio de Janeiro, the Thomas Cohn Arte Contemporânea show featured her works in 1990, 1992, and 1995.

== Critical reception ==
Lia is most famous (or infamous, rather) for her deconstruction of childhood through the transmogrification of dolls and plastic toys, which she began to explore during the 1990s.

Katia Kanton, writing in Poliester Magazine, describes her work this way:

"In her strange formal operations, Lia Menna Barreto defies the sweetened way of looking at the world of children. Her radical vision engenders a relevant social commentary that is involved with and questions the oppression of the everyday experience, full of mutilations and losses and feelings of safety and danger."

Also on the subject of Barreto's work with dolls, Paulo Herkenhoff says:

"In Menna Barreto's work, the experience is that of the unlearning and of the transgression. The crisis, more precisely, is that of the subject itself."
