= Alexandre Orion =

Brazilian street artist, multimedia artist and muralist

Alexandre Orion Orion
- Born: August 9, 1978 (age 47); São Paulo, Brazil
- Occupations: Muralist, Street artist, Multimedia artist
- Years active: 1992-present

Alexandre Orion (born 1978 in São Paulo) is a Brazilian street artist, multimedia artist and Muralist.

== Biography ==
Alexandre Orion (born 1978) is a multimedia artist. He started his work under the influence of urban culture and the world of graffiti in 1992. Soon he stood out from the movement he was part of and started to interact with the city in quite a unique way. In his own words, “a city is not a gallery; cities are themselves full of meanings”. It is precisely these meanings, often subtle ones, that he works on by interacting with people passing by on the street to make them part of his artistic work, while researching techniques and exploring issues that a city will hide. Orion has held several solo exhibitions internationally. His works have been shown at venues such as Centro Cultural Banco do Brasil, Itaú Cultural, Centro Cultural da Caixa, and Pinacoteca do Estado de São Paulo in Brazil. Venues that have shown his works, or acquired pieces for their collections, include Foundation Cartier pour l’art contemporain in Paris, Pinacoteca do Estado de São Paulo, Centrum Beeldende Kunst of Rotterdam, Itaú Cultural, Deutsche Bank and Mad Museum in New York, the Milwaukee Museum, Fundação Padre Anchieta, Nelson-Atkins Museum of Art, and Spencer Museum of Art.

== Works ==
=== Metabiotics ===
Metabiotics 20 - Urban intervention then photographed, 2009

Metabiotics involves finding a place in the city where Orion would paint the wall and with his camera at the ready, await the decisive instant when people interacted spontaneously with his paintings. Framing the precise situation promoted a joining of painting and real life, encouraging an encounter (or confrontation) between reality and fiction within the field of photography. This decisive moment of interaction between people and painted image led to Metabiotics, as opposed to traditional photography's conveying the false idea of all that is photographic being real. Metabiotics questions truthfulness: the paintings were actually done in the walls, people really did pass by and act spontaneously, but what we see suggests a type of montage that did not exist. Everything is both true and false. Painting and photography share the same environment like two inseparable yet incompatible organisms. Photography as purpose is environment in which there is no distinctive boundary between attachment and detachment between languages. There is something beyond the two viewpoints: a tenuous and infinite gap that leads us to non-existence.

=== Espólio ===
Espólio (Spoil) is a project developed by Orion in which he uses the pollution of the burning of fuel as raw material for its works. Through three series, the artist criticizes the contemporary way of life: Ossário (Ossuary), Polugrafia (Pollugraphy) and Poluição sobre muro (Pollution on walls).

==== Ossário ====
In 2006, Orion created Ossário (Ossuary), an intervention in one of São Paulo's road tunnels, spending 17 nights or early mornings using pieces of cloth to remove some of the thick layer of soot from vehicle exhausts impregnating sidewalls. But the grime was selectively wiped off in such a way that skulls were outlined by the grime left on the walls. The tunnel became a catacomb with over 3,500 hand-designed skulls reminding people that the same black soot impregnating tunnel walls also darkens our lungs and our lives. Our very own archeological site was brought to our notice. The work was done at night as Orion faced deafening traffic noise, the suffocating sensation of stagnant air, and numerous police checks. But cleaning is not a crime; polluting is. As the work progressed, it became clear that nobody could stop him cleaning up - except by doing the job before him. So a few weeks later, teams of municipal workers turned up to remove grime, but only from the intervention area. The rest of the tunnel was left as it was. As if nothing had happened, Orion continued working until the municipal staff returned. This time, they washed the whole tunnel. The name of the crime had changed: now it was censorship. After the intervention, all the road tunnels in the city were cleaned up. But the recently washed walls became black again in an amazing short time. The Ossário message had already been delivered. But Orion did not stop there. Returning to the tunnels, he drew the skulls and took the dust or soot off the walls using rags. Then, he washed the rags and waited for the soot to settle and the water to evaporate until just the black powder from exhaust tubes was left. This apparently useless toxic substance was made into pigment and used for the works in the Art Less Pollution series of large-scale paintings, their impressive realism evoking old advertising images with a touch of irony. Orion is using pollution to portray the apparently inoffensive everyday existence that produces it.

==== Polugrafia ====
Series of engravings that uses a technique created and baptized by the artist of Polugrafia (Pollugraphy): engravings made with pollution. The works are printed directly on the truck exhausts, using an unprecedented technique created by the artist after more than 3 years of research. The process consists in creating a metallic structure that carries a matrix with the image to be printed and a cotton canvas where the image will be fixed. The equipment is coupled to the exhaust of vehicles for periods ranging from a day to a week. As the vehicle travels through the city, the soot produced by burning fuel crosses the metal matrix and strikes the fabric by printing out the portraits created by Orion.

==== Poluição sobre muro ====
Public murals performed by the artist. The paintings in this series use as pigment only the soot collected during the Ossuary intervention. The by-product collected in the intervention becomes pigment and returns to the public space in the form of painting. In São Paulo, the "Apreensão" mural was painted in CEU Navegantes, in the Grajaú district.

=== Lampoonist ===
By merging the advertising technique with the aesthetics of graffiti, the artist dilutes the boundaries between the languages and brings both to a single focus of discussion. It is not a matter of appropriation but of dilution, of juxtaposition for the creation of a new repertoire. The works of the Lampoonist series are a hybrid between marginal and official, between informal and institutional. They create a luminous bridge for the shadowy writing of the streets and, without any concession, reveal the beauty of this transgressive aesthetic. In his conceptual quest, Orion uses the intricate forms of marginal writing to present in an encrypted manner words referring to the world of the arts, which define aesthetic characteristics or artistic movements, such as Kitsch and Naif.

=== Memo ===
MEMO rescues the technique of painting used by Orion at the beginning of his artistic activity, when he was walking through the streets of the city with a backpack full of sprays. They are, as Orion calls them, "collective self-portraits" of the numerous encounters that the street has given him. They are the intersubjective memory of the face, of the other as a mirror of exchange in which the artist reflects his experiences in the street.

=== Zapping ===
Zapping reveals a visual nuisance, a lack. Constructed of cut-out expanded PVC pieces, the turquoise color applied as a background results in a similar effect - in technique and concept - of the television chromaqui: what you see (or choose to see) is always a construction. The turquoise is used in all the pieces proposing a conceptual relation with the absence, the abstraction, the invisibility and, even, with the camouflage and mimicry. As in the cromaqui used in the false scenarios, the spectator can fill this void with the mental image that suits him best. The work has an explicit relation with speed and repetition. With images arranged repeatedly frame by frame, Orion dissects the movement in the likeness of the files known as GIFs, widely used in social networks. With that, it provokes a reflection on the frenzy and liquidity with which contemporary society relates to images and to human identity in the face of the bonds created between the people in these interfaces.

== Murals ==
Orion is specialist in the technique of forced perspective, in which the painting, when viewed from a specific location, forms perfectly independent of the surface being totally irregular. There are murals in several capitals of the world.

== Publications ==
Orion has two published books: Metabiótica, Via das Artes, 2006 Espólio, Tela.tv, 2013

He has interviews and works published in more than 10 languages, by publishers such as Thames and Hudson, Taschen, Éditions de la Martinière, Phaidon, Die Gestalten, Daab, Laurence King Publishers, Edelbra, Rotovision, Dokument Press, University of Toronto Press, Saraiva, Sigongart, Vivays Publishing, Tamesis, Eken Press many others.

== Articles ==
Articles in Portuguese:

Articles in German:

Articles in Swedish:
