= Luiza Prado =

Brazilian artist

- Born: 1988 (age 37–38); Guaratingueta
- Movement: Contemporary Art

Luiza Jesus Prado, known as Hifa Cybe, is a transdisciplinary artist born in Guaratingueta, Brazil, in 1988. She uses artistic tools such as photography, performance, video art, installation, sculpture, painting, new media, body art, music and drawing along with physics, psychology, neuroscience and philosophy. Her research is specifically on memory. She explores topics of violence, sexual trauma, sociopolitical issues and minorities within Latin America. She has been mentioned as a feminist artist in FFW, Geledés and O Grito. In 2014, her work "Corpo Estranho" was cataloged in the Portuguese book Evocations of Performance Art – Paco Editorial and since 2010 has been featured in Playboy Magazine, Digital Photographer and Efêmero Concreto among others.

== Discography ==
- 2020: Social Esotropia
- 2017: Poteh Pehuono
- 2017: Funk Pesadão
- 2016: Tumor Militar

== Filmography ==
- 2014: Reincarnate Project
