= Eduardo Recife =

Brazilian artist

- Born: August 12, 1980 (age 44); Belo Horizonte, Brazil
- Known for: Graphic design, typography
- Website: www.eduardorecife.com

Eduardo Recife is an artist, illustrator and typographer from Brazil, known for his distinct collage style which combines vintage imagery, magazine cuts, textures, stains and many details and symbols. Recife is also known for his 35 typefaces, of which the majority is freeware.

Recife received the Cannes Lion Gold (2011), the American Illustration (2009) and the Young Illustrations Award (2014). In the field of photography, the artist has had his work acknowledged with the publishing of his book “My Dear India” (2010).
