= Mariza Dias Costa =

Guatemalan-Brazilian political cartoonist and illustrator (1952–2019)

- guest of ladyscomics.com in 2017
- Born: October 16, 1952; Guatemala
- Died: March 29, 2019 (aged 66); São Paulo
- Known for: political cartoons

Mariza Dias Costa (October 16, 1952 – March 29, 2019) was a Guatemalan-Brazilian political cartoonist and illustrator who influenced her genre with her novel approach.

== Life ==
Costa is said to have been born in Guatemala, but other sources say she was born in Rio de Janeiro in Brazil. Her father was Mário Dias Costa, a diplomat. She lived in Switzerland, Peru, Italy, France, Paraguay, and Iraq before establishing in Brazil.

She received an "acquisition award" at the 3ª Mostra de Artes Visuais do Estado do Rio de Janeiro in 1974. She found her niche in the same year illustrating the "Court Diary" column of Paulo Francis in the Folha de S.Paulo leading Brazilian national newspaper. She continued in this partnership until 1990. She had to work fast as she would receive the text for the column and the space was already identified for her illustration. In 1999 she returned to the Folha de S.Paulo newspaper to illustrate the Thursday column of the psychoanalyst Contardo Calligaris.

In the late 1970s her work appeared in Mad magazine and in 2008 she exhibited her work in the "Ilustradores" at the Instituto Itaú.

== Works (incomplete) ==
Costa provided the illustrations for 'Os Incríveis Seres Fantásticos' in 1996

== Acknowledgement and death ==
She is noted as a cartoonist veteran because she worked under the Brazilian military dictatorship. In 2013 her work was published in a retrospective book titled ""... And Then the Crazy Is Me!". The introduction to her book said that the political cartoonist genre was split into two sections. The part before Costa and the part after her work was seen.

Costa died in São Paulo. She was taken ill on the street and she was taken by ambulance to the hospital but she did not survive.
