= Nicolina Vaz de Assis =

Brazilian sculptor

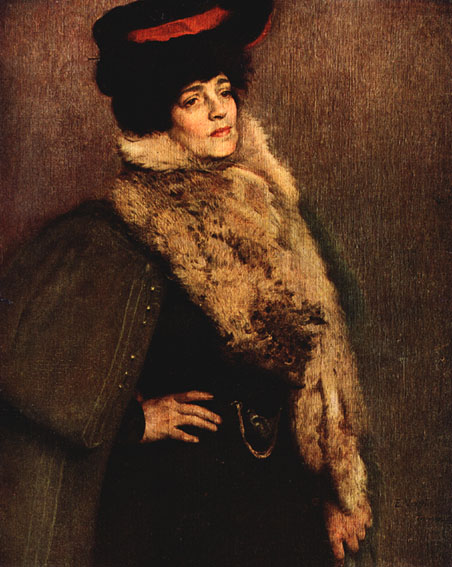
- Portrait, 1905, by Eliseu Visconti
- Born: 1874; Campinas, Brazil
- Died: 1941 (aged 66–67); Rio de Janeiro, Brazil
- Known for: Sculpture
- Spouse(s): Benigno de Assis, Rodolfo Pinto do Couto

Nicolina Vaz de Assis Pinto do Couto (Campinas, 1874 – Rio de Janeiro, 1941) was a Brazilian sculptor.

== Early life ==
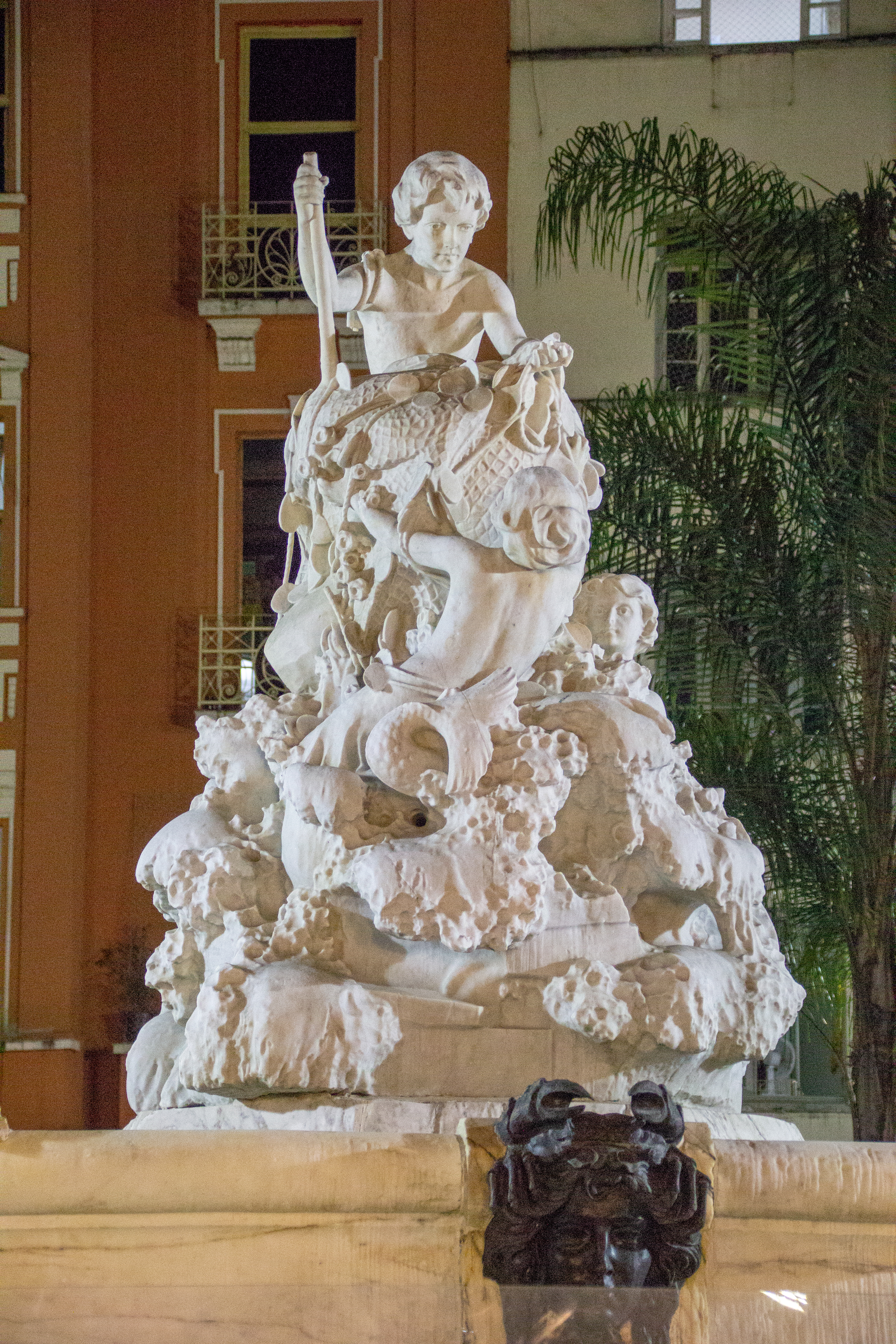
Fonte Monumental (São Paulo).

She began her studies at the Museu Nacional de Belas Artes in Rio de Janeiro, where she entered in 1897, and studied under Professor Rodolfo Bernardelli.

She was awarded a scholarship by the Art School of the State of São Paulo allowing her to travel to Paris and stay in the French capital from 1904 to 1907, where she continued to perfect her art. She entered the Académie Julian where she studied with Alexandre Falguière and Denys Puech.

== Career ==
Her works were admitted to the Paris Salon. In Brazil, she regularly participated in salons organized by the National School of Fine Arts between 1899 and 1935. In 1911, she married Portuguese sculptor Rodolfo Pinto do Couto.

In 1950, the management of the National Museum of Fine Arts of Brazil presented her works posthumously in tribute to the illustrious sculptor.
