= Angelo Venosa =

Brazilian sculptor (1948–2022)

- Born: 14 August 1954; São Paulo, Brazil
- Died: 17 October 2022 (aged 68); Rio de Janeiro, Brazil
- Occupation: Sculptor

Angelo Venosa (14 August 1954 – 17 October 2022) was a Brazilian sculptor.

== Life and career ==
Born in São Paulo, the son of two Italian immigrants, Venosa studied art at the Escola Brasil in his hometown, industrial design at the Rio de Janeiro State University and followed courses at Escola de Artes Visuais do Parque Lage.

Venosa started his artistic career in 1974, and got notoriety in the 1980s, as part of the Geração 80 movement. His sculptures are characterized from the use of different materials, of both industrial and natural origin. He took part in several notable festivals, including the São Paulo Art Biennial and of the Venice Biennale. Among his best known works is "A Baleia" ("The Whale"), a public work installed in Leme Beach, in the south of Rio de Janeiro. His last work was the installation "Catilina", exposed at the Paço Imperial. Venosa was diagnosed in 2019 with amyotrophic lateral sclerosis. He died, at the age of 68, of consequences of the neurodegenerative disease.
