= Mariannita Luzzati =

Brazilian visual artist

Mariannita Luzzati (born December 27, 1963) is a Brazilian visual artist from São Paulo, recognized for her extensive study of landscapes.

== Biography ==
Painter, engraver, designer, and video artist, Mariannita Luzzati studied at the Istituto per L'Arte e il Restauro (Palazzo Spinelli) in Florence (Italy) and later in Brazil with the artists Carlos Fajardo, Carmela Gross and Evandro Carlos Jardim, holding her first institutional exhibitions in the late 1980s and participating in the Contemporary Art Salons in São Paulo, Rio de Janeiro and Curitiba.

In 1991, Luzzati received the Brasília Prize for Plastic Arts from the XII National Salon of Plastic Arts and was awarded at the International Print Exhibition of the Machida City Museum of Graphic Arts in Tokyo. From then on, her work began to be better known, becoming part of exhibitions and institutional collections of contemporary art in Brazil and abroad, including: Pinacoteca do Estado de São Paulo - Estação Pinacoteca; MAM - Museum of Modern Art of São Paulo; National Museum of Rio de Janeiro; Haus der Kulturen der Welt, in Berlin; Museum of London; The British Museum, in London; and the 22nd São Paulo International Biennial, where she represented Brazil.

She was one of the artists chosen for the exhibition Mulheres Artistas e Brasileiras held in honor of President Dilma Rousseff in 2011 at the Palácio do Planalto in Brasília on the visit of the President of the United States, Barack Obama, to Brazil.

In 2011, Mariannita Luzzati conceived and designed the project Cinemúsica, in partnership with her husband, the pianist Marcelo Bratke. The project's proposal was to bring a multimedia performance to Brazilian penitentiaries through which images of nature were related to the work of Heitor Villa-Lobos inspired by nature. The Cinemúsica project was performed in 10 prisons in the State of São Paulo, when a documentary about the project was produced by Luzzati. Since then, Cinemúsica has also been performed in cultural institutions in Brazil and abroad, including: MIS - Museum of Image and Sound, in São Paulo; Festival of the World 2012 at the Southbank Centre in London; Sarajevo Winter Festival (Bosnia and Herzegovina); Sala São Paulo, and Fundação Brasilea in Basel, (Switzerland), among others. The Cinemúsica project had over 60 national and international performances and received The Art of Touch award at the Sarajevo Winter Festival, in 2013.

In 2016, Mariannita Luzzati was nominated for the Pipa Prize.

In 2021, the Figueiredo Ferraz Institute (Ribeirão Preto, Brazil), celebrating its 10 years of activities, held a large retrospective exhibition of the work of Mariannita Luzzati, entitled “Paisagens Possíveis" (Possible Landscapes).

== Awards ==
- 1990 – Acquisition Award – XI Engraving Exhibition of the City of Curitiba
- 1991 – First Prize – Ribeirão Preto Art Salon
- 1991 – First Prize – Brasília Prize for Plastic Arts – XII National Salon of Plastic Arts
- 1993 – Acquisition Award – Engraving Exhibition – Machida City Museum of Graphic Arts, Tokyo (Japan)
- 2007 – Bolsa Iberê Camargo – Ateliê de Gravura
- 2015 – Sarajevo Winter Festival – Art of Touch Award (for Cinemúsica)
