= Lúcio Noeman =

Brazilian sculptor

- Born: 1913–1915; Rio de Janeiro, Brazil

Lúcio Noeman was a Brazilian artist who specialized in clay sculptures.

== Biography ==
Noeman was born in Rio de Janeiro, Brazil, between 1913 and 1915. After working in a stationery store and as a street vendor selling ties and perfumes, he attended the Occupational Therapy Service in 1948, where he started modeling in clay. His work was shown at the São Paulo Museum of Modern Art in an exhibition titled 9 artistas de engenho de dentro in 1949.

Against the wishes of Noeman and his doctor Nise da Silveira, Noeman underwent a lobotomy that caused an irreversible change in his artistic style. He is featured in a film titled Nise: The Heart of Madness.
