= Julieta de França =

Brazilian sculptor

Julieta de França (1870–1951) was a pioneering Brazilian sculptor. The first woman to win the Prêmio de viagem ao exterio (Prize for travel abroad) in 1900, she was able to study at the Académie Julian in Paris. On returning to Brazil five years later, her proposal for participating in a contest for a work representing the Republic of Brazil was refused on the grounds that her submission was not representative. In retrospect, the refusal appears simply to have been because she was a woman.

== Biography ==
Born in Belém in 1870, Julieta de França was the daughter of the artist Joaquim Pinto de França and his wife Idalina. She began studying under the Italian artist Domenico de Angelis in 1897 after which she attended live model class at the Escola Nacional de Belas Artes (ENDA) in Rio de Janeiro. In 1900, she became the first woman to win the Prêmio de viagem ao exterio, a prestigious travel scholarship which allowed her to spend the next five years in Paris (1901–1905) where she studied sculpture at the Académie Julian and at the Institut Rodin under Antoine Bourdelle, Rodin's principal student. As a result, she was able create works in the style of the period. Of particular merit was her Le Rêve de l’enfant prodigue which was welcomed by the critics when it was presented at the Salon in 1904. In Brazil, her work was also appreciated.

On completing her studies in France, Julieta de França returned to Brazil where she received high acclaim for her works, including a silver medial in 1907 and a gold medal in 1908. As a result, she received numerous successful commissions, both public and private. But her success was not to last. In 1907, she participated in a national contest submitting a proposal for a work to commemorate the Proclamation of the Republic. Her proposal was however rejected by the jury for not being representative. Upset by their decision, she returned to Europe where she sought the opinion of leading artists including Rodin, Bourdelle and Carolus-Duran. They all provided strong support for her proposal but the ENBA under the leadership of Rodolfo Bernardelli did not react. She completely withdrew from further creative work.

Julieta de França died in Rio de Janeiro in 1951.
