= Rodolfo Pinto do Couto =

Portuguese sculptor

- Born: 1888; Porto, Portugal
- Died: 1945 (aged 56–57); Portugal
- Known for: Sculpture

Rodolfo Pinto do Couto (Porto, Portugal, 1888–Portugal, 1945) was a Portuguese sculptor active in Portugal and Brazil.

== Works ==
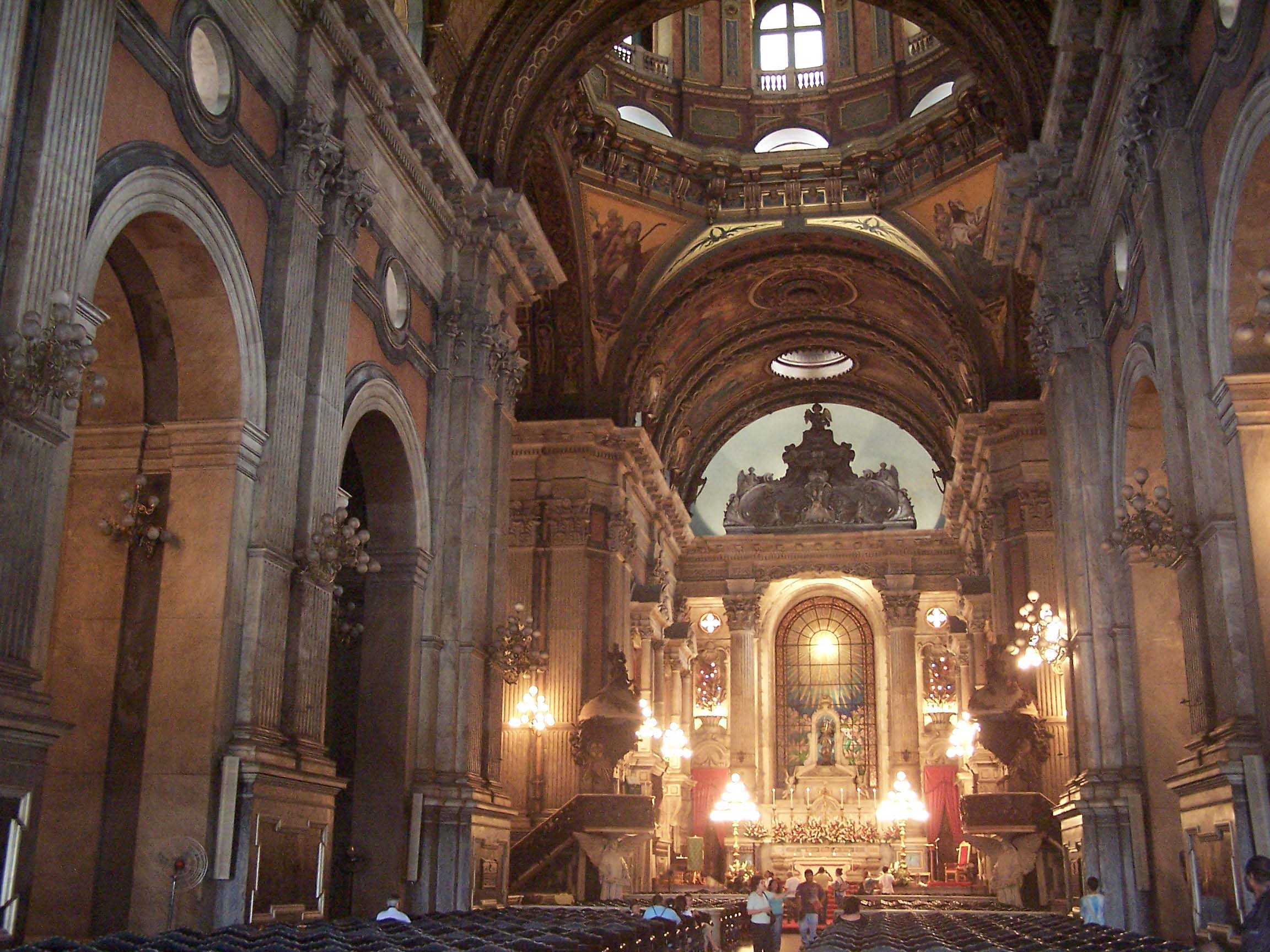
Candelaria Church, where Pinto do Couto erected bronze pulpits in 1931

Among the most well-known works of Rodolfo Pinto do Couto are:

- Bust of Portuguese writer Fialho de Almeida, patinated bronze - 1928
- Bronze pulpits (1931) of the Church of the Candelaria in Rio de Janeiro
