= Guto Bussab =

Guto Bussab (born Augusto Bussab) is a Brazilian-born artist, photographer, and filmmaker based in Cape Town, South Africa.

== Early life and education ==
Bussab was born in São Paulo, Brazil. He completed an honours degree in social communication at the Escola Superior de Propaganda e Marketing in 1993.

== Career ==
=== Advertising ===
Bussab worked in advertising in Brazil before moving to South Africa in 1994, where he worked as an art director and received awards at the Cannes International Advertising Festival, New York Festivals, London International Awards, and South Africa's Loerie Awards.

=== Film ===
He founded the Cape Town production company Muti Films in 1998, directing commercials for clients including MTN, British Airways, Western Union, and Sasfin, as well as the web series Gaze. He directed the music video for M.anifest's "No Fear," featuring Vic Mensa and Moliy (2021). He served as director of photography on Prime (2023), a South African psychological thriller written and directed by Thabiso Christopher, which premiered at the Durban International Film Festival before streaming globally on Netflix from January 2024. He co-produced the 2008 film Gangster's Paradise: Jerusalema. He worked as a photographer documenting Cape Town's bid to become World Design Capital 2014, and subsequently became one of the programme's curators.

=== Visual art ===
Bussab's work spans painting, photography, and video installation, and has addressed themes including identity, inequality, and gender politics. His 2016 solo exhibition Still was held at AGOG Gallery in Johannesburg.
