= Beto Shwafaty =

Brazilian artist (born 1977)

Beto Shwafaty (born 1977, São Paulo) is a Brazilian conceptual artist, visual researcher and critic.

== Contents ==
=== Life and work ===
Shwafaty is an artist and researcher based in Brazil. He has a bachelor's degree from UNICAMP (Campinas, 2001), obtained a master's degree in visual arts and curatorial studies from Nuova Accademia di Belle Arti–NABA (Milan, 2010) and attended Simon Starling's classes at the Staedelschule (Frankfurt am Main, 2010–2011). Shwafaty has been involved with collective, research-based, curatorial and spatial practices since early 2000s, and as a result, his own practice explores the converging spheres of critical design, spatial politics, knowledge economy, and visual culture in ways that assume art as a productive system able to stimulate changes and reflections on social behavior and cognition when related to historical, interdisciplinary, and public issues.
His concerns pass through diverse issues regarding public space, conviviality and visual culture in specific sociocultural and political contexts. Using diverse methods and languages – that ranges from installations, sculptural and spatial situations, design and printed matter to research-based and docu-fictional strategies – he aims to explore the possibilities of being at same time a productive agent, a reflexive and critical actor. In this sense, art production becomes a way to approach the real as at the same time an opportunity to question pre-assumed positions.
The materialization of his projects can be considered as hybrid units of information, assumed as possibilities to generate (or recover) specific sets of knowledge. Through notions and acts of critique, appropriation and translation he intends to create situations where issues and debates about the functions and communicative qualities of art may emerge and be articulated within certain levels of society and the public sphere.

=== Exhibitions ===
Among past and forthcoming exhibitions, his work has been exhibited at 9th Mercosul Biennial (Porto Alegre, 2013); Mythologies, MAM SP (São Paulo, 2013); 33rd Panorama of Brazilian Art, MAM SP (São Paulo, 2013); X São Paulo Architecture Biennial (2013); Contra Escambos (Belo Horizonte and Recife, 2013); Eternal Tour, SESC (São Paulo, 2012); Mythologies, Cité des Arts (Paris, 2011); Shadowed by the future, Instituto Cervantes (São Paulo, 2010); 4th IABR - Rotterdam Architecture Biennial: Urbaninform (Netherlands, 2009); 3rd Utrecht Manifest (Netherlands, 2009); Public Turbulence, Isola Art Center (Milan, 2009); Utopia for Sale, Akademie der Künste (Berlin, 2009); The Building: E-flux, Berlin, 2009; Rumos Artes Visuais, Itaú Cultural (São Paulo, 2006).

=== Critical texts ===
Shwafaty has written in recent years, diverse critical art reviews and critical reports. His texts appeared at Forum Permanente web platform (critical report on the 54th Venice Biennial and coordination of critical reports on the 30th Paulo Biennial's Seminars among other texts); Livro para Responder, Capacete (Rio de Janeiro, 2012). He also won the Mario Pedrosa prize for essays on contemporary culture from Fundação Joaquim Nabuco (Recife 2012). Recently, Shwafaty edited the photo-book The Life of the Centers, about urbanism and memory regarding three central areas of São Paulo.

=== Awards ===
Shwafaty received diverse awards, including: Graham Foundation's exhibition grant (Chicago, 2013); 9o Rede Nacional Funarte (Rio de Janeiro, 2012); PROAC - São Paulo’s State support to produce photographic book The Life of the Centers (ISBN 978-85-62114-22-9, São Paulo, 2011–2013); PROCULTURA MinC, Government support for the web magazine and platform Translados.org (Brazil, 2011); Brazilian government travel aid for artists to attend Staedelschule Frankfurt (2010); Nominated to UNIDEE residency / partial grant, Cittadellarte Pistolleto Foundation (Biella, 2009); M.A. Scholarship at Nuova Accademia di Belle Arti (NABA (Milan, 2009). Acquisition prizes at: 31st Ribeirão Preto Contemporary exhibition (Brazil, 2006); 35th Piracicaba Contemporary exhibition (Brazil, 2003); MACC, Contemporary Art Museum of Campinas (Brazil 2002). He attended art residencies at Eco & Narciso / RES-Ò (Turin, 2012) and Other possible worlds, Casino Luxemburg (Luxemburg, 2011).
