= Rachel Rosalen =

Brazilian artist

Rachel Rosalen is a Brazilian artist who works in São Paulo and Tokyo.

== Biography ==
Rosalen was born in São Paulo, Brazil. She received a bachelor's degree in architecture and urbanism from the Fine Arts University of São Paulo and a master's in multimedia art from Campinas State University (UNICAMP), Brazil. She also had a Fellowship of CNPq as a teacher and researcher at the Department of Communication and Body Arts at the Pontifical Catholic University, São Paulo, Brazil from 2002–03, and was invited to teach the post-graduate course Creation of Images and Sounds on the Electronic Media, São Paulo, SENAC, from 2002–05. In 2003, she received an Artist in Residence Fellowship from the Japan Foundation at N&A Nanjo and Associates Curatorial Office. Since then, she has lived and worked in both São Paulo and Tokyo.

In 2006, she won a New Media Prize from the state government of São Paulo (Prêmio de Apoio a Cultura de São Paulo). In 2007, she won the Sérgio Motta Art and Technology Foundation Prize., with a work, "The Garden of Love" That same year, she was invited to be a resident artist at Warteck PP, Basel, Switzerland.

In recent years, Rosalen has followed a unique path in Brazilian electronic art production. Her work includes video, performance art, telematics, interactive video installations, projects based on databases, and programming. She often assembles specific interfaces for each work and makes use of these devices to discuss a broader project dealing with relationships between life and death, war, violence, the media, eroticism, and the construction of the body in the contemporary metropolis. She often invites other artists, programmers, or electronic engineers to collaborate in her projects.
