= Carla Zaccagnini =

Brazilian artist and curator

- Born: 1973 (age 52–53); Buenos Aires, Argentina

Carla Zaccagnini (born 1973) is a Brazilian artist and curator.

== Early life and education ==
Zaccagnini was born in Buenos Aires in 1973. In 1981 she moved to Brazil with her family. She received a BFA degree from the Fundação Armando Alvares Penteado, São Paulo in 1995. In 2004 Zaccagnini earned an MA in Visual Poetics from the Universidade de São Paulo.

== Career ==
Zaccagnini was assistant curator at the Museu de Arte Moderna de São Paulo from 2001 to 2002, and director of the curatorial department at Centro Cultural São Paulo in 2008. IN 2021 she was a guest curator for the 34th Bienal de São Paulo. In 2022, Zaccagnini published a book, Cuentos de Cuentas (Accounts of Accounting), both a memoir and a book about money and financial collapse.

== Collections ==
Her work is included, among other, in the collection of the Tate Museum, London and the Guggenheim Museum. Her work Elements of Beauty: a Tea Set is Never Only a Tea Set, 2014 - 2015 is held in the collection of the Museu de Arte de Sao Paulo.

== Personal ==
Zaccagnini is married to fellow artist, Runo Lagomarsino, and they both exhibited in Los Angeles in 2016.
