= Luzia Simons =

Brazilian visual artist (born 1953)

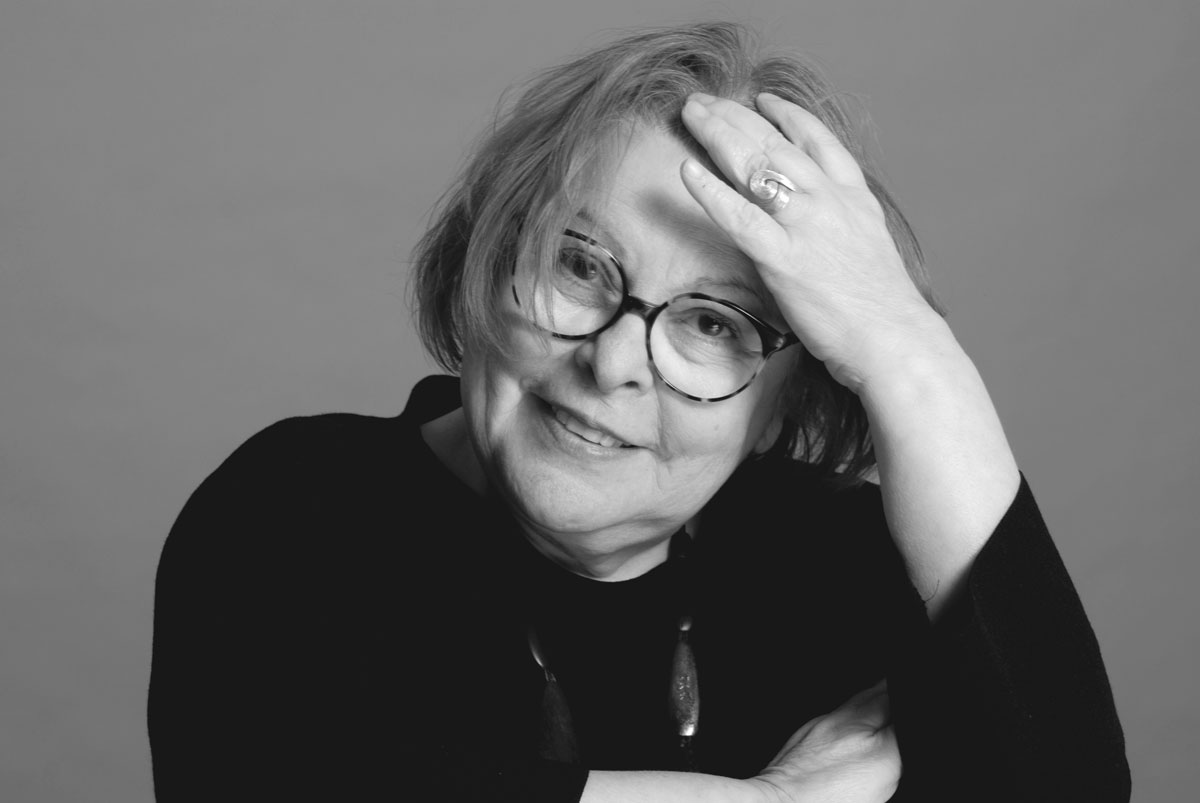
Portrait of Luzia Simons in 2019

Luzia Simons (born 1953) is a Brazilian visual artist, living in Berlin. Simons has exhibited her work internationally, including a solo exhibition at the Pinacoteca do Estado de São Paulo in Brazil. Simons is a pioneer in the development of the scanogram—a media technique that combines elements of painting and photography.

== Early life and education ==
Simons was born in 1953 in Quixadá, Ceará, Brazil. From 1977 to 1981 she studied history at Université Paris VIII Vincennes. From 1984 to 1986 she studied Fine Arts at the Sorbonne Paris. From 1988 to 2010 she was a lecturer at the Puppet Theater Program, Staatlichen Hochschule für Musik und Darstellende Kunst, Stuttgart, Germany.

== Art career ==
Identity as a sociocultural construction has been central in Simons' works since she left Brazil at the age of 23. Her questions are directed at continuity, vulnerability of the individual and about notions of transference of culture in a globalised world. Her own biography serves as a trigger for the works that encompass photography, performance, video, sculpture, drawing and recently watercolor and tapestry.

=== Stockage series (1996-ongoing) ===
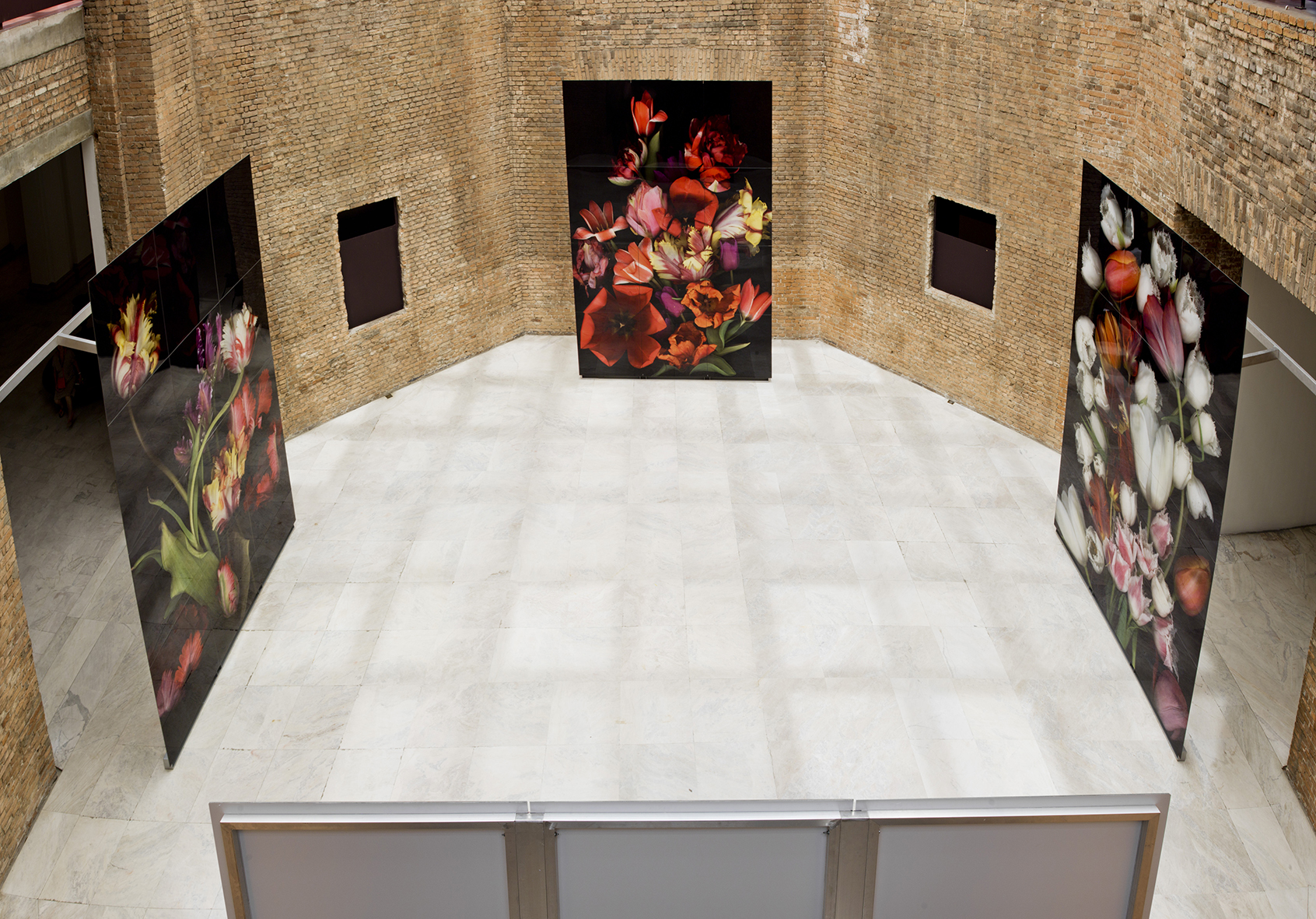
Segmentos at Pinacoteca do Estado de São Paulo, Brazil, 2013.

Simons began the Stockage series in 1996 and has been developing new image modalities ever since. The artist uses a specialized high-resolution scanner in a linear mode, without a point of view or central focus, for her compositions with flowers and botanical elements, specially the tulip. These are then produced using a light-beam printing process and mounted in a high-gloss finish, both in smaller and monumental sizes. The images produced present intensely brilliant colors and tremendous acuity. In Simons' work, the flower still life receives a multi-layered cultural and socio-political message. The artist stages the tulips as a sort of homage to Dutch or Flemish baroque still lifes with flowers, sometimes suggesting the tulip mania in seventeenth-century Holland. Out of this history, Simons' tulip becomes a metaphor for globalization, intercultural identity, and cultural nomadism.

== Exhibitions ==
=== Solo exhibitions ===
- 2002, Luzia Simons – Face Migration / Sichtvermerke, Württembergischer Kunstverein Stuttgart, Germany
- 2006, Luzia Simons – Stockage, Künstlerhaus Bethanien, Berlin, Germany
- 2013, Luzia Simons – Segmentos, Pinacoteca do Estado de São Paulo, São Paulo, Brazil

=== Group exhibitions ===
- 2016, Vanitas Rerum, Musée des Archives Nationales, Hôtel de Soubise, Paris, France
- 2017, Curitiba Biennial 2017, Curitiba, Brazil
- 2019, Art Season Domaine de Chaumont-sur-Loire, Centre d'Arts et de Nature, Chaumont-sur-Loire, France
- 2019, B.A.R.O.C.K., Caputh Palace, Schwielowsee and ME Collectors Room, Berlin, Germany
- 2021, XXVI Rohkunstbau, Castle Lieberose, Spreewald, Germany
- 2021, Brasilidade Pós-Modernismo, Centro Cultural Banco do Brasil, Rio de Janeiro, Brazil

== Collections ==
- Kunsthalle Emden, Germany
- Kupferstich-Kabinett, Staatliche Kunstsammlungen Dresden (Dresden State Art Collections), Germany
- Fonds national d'art contemporain (FRAC), Le Plateau (centre d'art contemporain) and Fonds régional d'art contemporain de Normandie-Caen, France
- Pirelli Collection/São Paulo Museum of Art, São Paulo, Brazil
- New Carlsberg Foundation, Denmark

== Publications ==
=== Books by Simons ===
- Simons, Luzia (2003). Luzia Simons: Transit. Patrice Cotensin, Tereza de Arruda, Werner Knoedgen. Ostfildern: Hatje Cantz.
- Luzia Simons: Scannogramme & Installation; Stockage. Claudia Emmert, Mitch Cohen, Luzia Simons, Berlin. Exhibition Luzia Simons Stockage 2006, Künstlerhaus Bethanien, Berlin: 2006.
- Simons, Luzia (2012). Luzia Simons. Matthias Harder. Berlin: Distanz.
- Simons, Luzia (2016). Installations in situ Archives Nationales, Paris - Pinacoteca do Estado de São Paulo. Tereza, de Aruda, Hans Schiler. [Berlin].
- Dams, Saskia (2019). Luzia Simons | Naturgeschichten. Günter Dr. Baumann, Museum in Kleihues-Bau Stadt Kornwestheim, Brandes and Mediaservice, Altenriet.
- Simons, Luzia. Traces. Berlin: Distanz, 2021. Edited by Tereza de Arruda. ISBN 978-3-95476-408-2.

=== Books with contributions by Simons ===
- B.A.R.O.C.K. (2019): künstlerische Interventionen in Schloss Caputh und der Wunderkammer der Olbricht Collection, Berlin. Editors: Samuel Wittwer and Mark Gisbourne. Luzia Simons, Myriam Thyes, Rebecca Stevenson, Stiftung Preußische Schlösser und Gärten Berlin-Brandenburg. Esslingen.
