= Márcia X =

Brazilian performer and visual artist

- Born: Márcia Pinheiro de Oliveira; 1959; Rio de Janeiro, RJ, Brazil
- Died: February 2, 2005 (aged 45–46); Rio de Janeiro, RJ, Brazil
- Known for: Installation, performance
- Website: http://marciax.art.br/

Márcia Pinheiro de Oliveira (Rio de Janeiro, 1959 - Rio de Janeiro, 2005) was a Brazilian performer and visual artist. Her performances, videos and installations deal with themes of sexuality, eroticism, consumerism, childhood and religion, often using sex toys, children's toys and religious artifacts.

== Name ==
Márcia adopted the "X" in her name after the repercussions of a performance done in collaboration with her then-husband Alex Hamburgo at Rio de Janeiro's Book Biennial in 1985 where she was fully undressed. The fashion stylist of the same name, Márcia Pinheiro, did not appreciate her name being related to this "scandalous" performance, prompting the artist to change her name to Márcia X. Pinheiro before shortening it to just Márcia X.

== Career ==
Márcia X studied at the School of Visual Arts Parque Lage in Rio de Janeiro at the beginning of the 1980s. During that period, she participated in the third Salão Nacional de Artes Plásticas, where her performance Cozinhar-te won her the Prêmio Viagem ao País award.

In 1985, she began to collaborate in interventions and performances with the poet and artist Alex Hamburgo.

In 1988 and 1990, she had her first solo shows, Ícones do Gênero Humano, at the Centro Cultural Cândido Mendes, Rio de Janeiro, and Coleção Gênios da Pintura at the Galeria Casa Triângulo, São Paulo.

By 1990, Márcia X started to work on pieces that questioned eroticism, appropriating the symbolic aspect of industrialized sex toys. Her series Fábrica Fallus (1990-2005) utilizes rubber penises ironically juxtaposed with objects and materials usually associated with femininity, childhood and religion. In Os Kaminhas Sutrinhas (1995), headless dolls in pairs or trios mimic sexual acts atop toy beds decorated with childish motifs.

In 2001, Márcia X took part in the exhibition Panorama da Arte Brasileira, at the São Paulo Museum of Modern Art, Rio and Salvador, as well as the third Mercosul Biennial in Porto Alegre. During that period, between 2001 and 2003, she collaborated in group shows with her second husband, sculptor Ricardo Ventura.

At the end of 2005, Márcia X had the piece Desenhando com Terços ("Drawing with rosary beads") in the exhibition "Erótica - Os sentidos da arte", curated by Tadeu Chiarelli for the Centro Cultural Banco do Brasil. Made out of two pairs of rosaries displayed in the shape of penises, the piece was considered offensive for its mixture of Catholicism and eroticism and asked to be removed from the exhibition in April 2006. Despite protests by the artistic community defending freedom of speech, the piece was removed from the show. The then Culture Minister, Gilberto Gil, condemned the censorship of the work.

In lieu of the donation of her archives to the Museu de Arte Moderna do Rio de Janeiro in 2013, MAM-RJ organized a retrospective of Márcia X's work in what would be her first solo exhibition since her death in 2005. Alongside her works and documentation of her performances, the exhibition also featured a replica of her studio at Catete, Rio de Janeiro neighborhood.
