= Abigail de Andrade =

Brazilian painter (1864–1890)

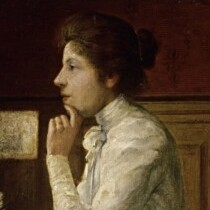
- self portrait (detail from painting)
- Born: 1864; Vassouras
- Died: 1890 (aged 25–26); 12th arrondissement of Paris
- Occupation: painter
- Partner: Angelo Agostini
- Children: 2 (3?)

Abigail de Andrade (1864–1890) was a Brazilian painter. Abigail de Andrade's name is mentioned by the painter and art historian Theodoro Braga (1872-1953), who lists the few studies published about Abigail de Andrade in the book Artists Painters from Brazil, 1942.

== Early life and education ==
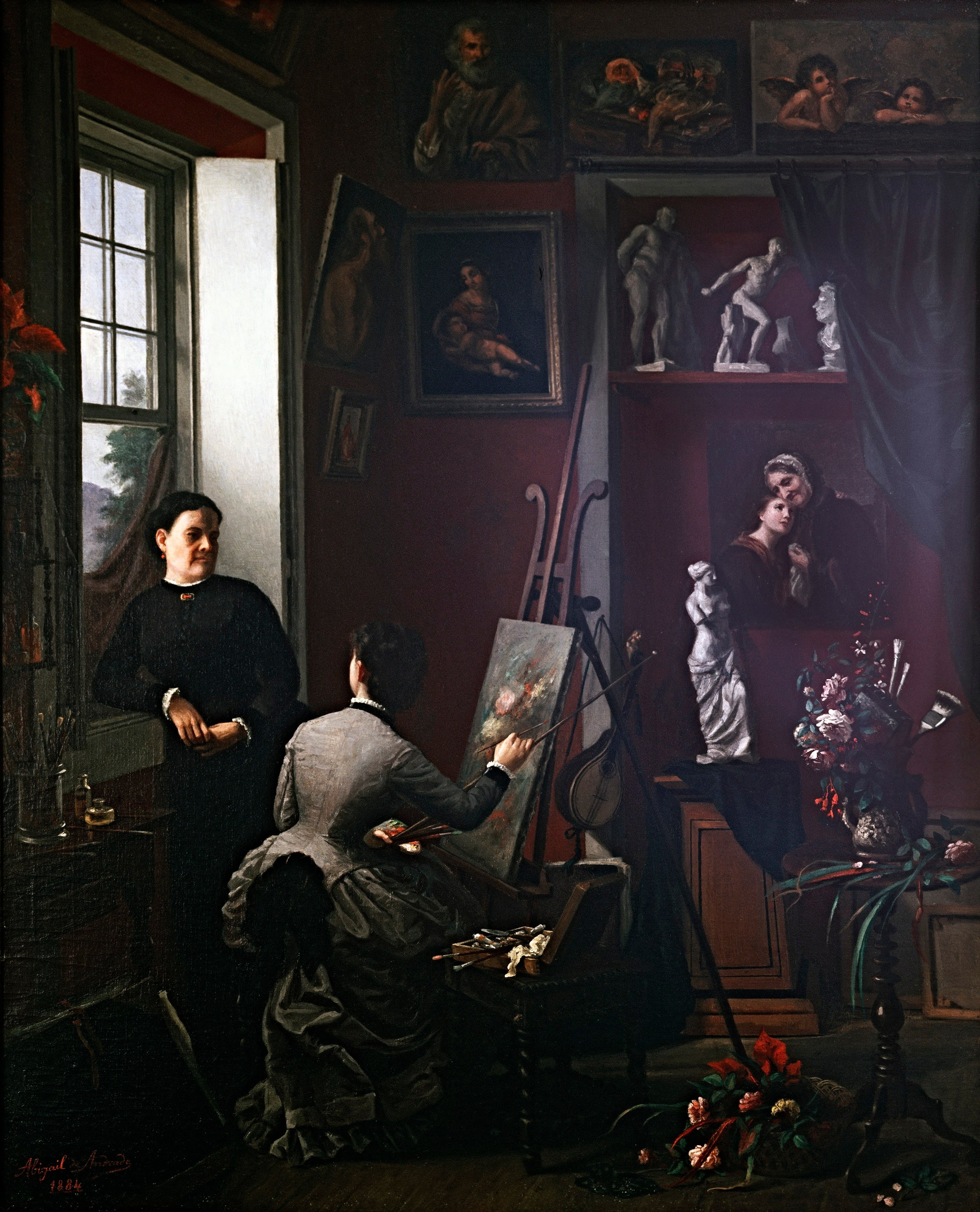
Um canto do meu ateliê (A corner of my studio), (1884)

Andrade was born in Vassouras, in the province of Rio de Janeiro. She studied at the Liceu de Artes e Ofícios in 1882, one year after the institution first admitted women. Her teachers included Angelo Agostini and Joaquim José Insley Pacheco. Andrade painted genre scenes, still lifes and portraits.

== Career ==
Andrade participated in the Imperial Academy of Fine Arts' Salon in 1884, winning the gold medal. Two of her paintings, O cesto de compras (Shopping basket) and Um canto do meu ateliê (A corner of my studio), were praised by the art critics.

Andrade had two solo exhibitions in 1886 in Rio de Janeiro, at Casa Vicitas and Casa Costrejean.

== Personal life ==
Andrade's relationship with her teacher Angelo Agostini, who was married, caused a scandal in Rio de Janeiro society. The couple left Brazil in 1888 for Paris, with their daughter Angelina Agostini (1888-1973), who also became a painter. Andrade had a second son with Agostini, Angelo, who died of tuberculosis after birth. She died a year later of the same illness.

== Gallery ==
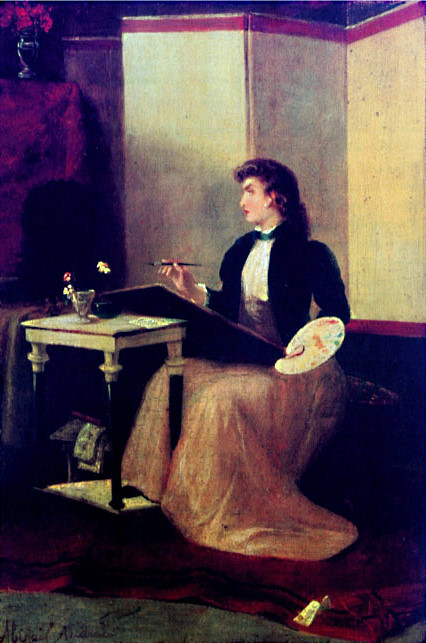
Untitled (1881)

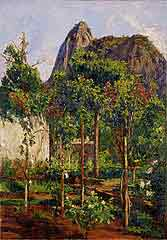
Abigail de Andrade, Corcovado

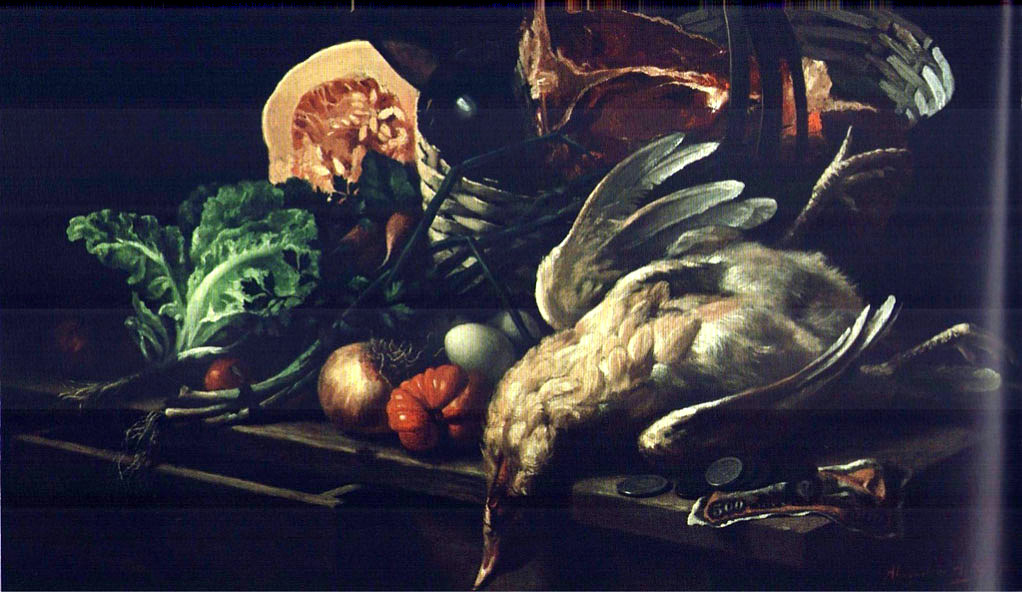
Abigail de Andrade - O cesto de compras, 1884

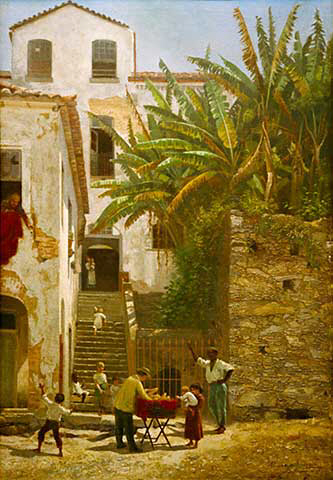
A hora do pão (The bread hour), (1889)
