= Amanda Maciel Antunes =

Brazilian artist

Amanda Maciel Antunes is an LA based multidisciplinary artist working in painting, costuming, performance, writing, and installation art. She was born and raised in the countryside of the state of São Paulo, Brazil.

Antunes was born in Sorocaba, Brazil, and grew up in Salto de Pirapora, São Paulo. After living in São Paulo in the early 2000s, she relocated to the east coast of the United States, where she launched a career in costume design and founded an arts and culture magazine called Spirited. She has designed costumes for the stage, including for the award-winning production of The Flick with Annie Baker and Hollywood's debut of Possum Carcass, with David Bucci. She has also designed and made costumes for musicians, including Katie Chastain's dress in "Snowshow", directed by Nathan Johnson, and Icelandic artist Kristín Björk Kristjánsdóttir. Her recent exhibitions include: Solo Exhibit Skeleton Women (LA Artwalk), Midnight Roses (Nous Tous Gallery Chinatown LA), Don Quixote (Montserrat DTLA), Autopsicografia (Moon Huts LA) and she is currently working on two proposed installations and experimental performances in Los Angeles and Reykjavik, respectively.
