= Mara Alvares =

Brazilian artist (born 1948)

- Born: 1948 (age 77–78); Porto Alegre, Brazil
- Education: Universidade Federal do Rio Grande do Sul (BA, 1973); School of the Art Institute of Chicago (MFA, 1993)
- Known for: Photography, performance art, metal engraving
- Movement: Nervo Óptico, Espaço N.O
- Awards: 7th Salão Nacional de Artes Plásticas Acquisition Prize (1984)

Mara Alvares (Porto Alegre, Brazil, 1948) is a Brazilian artist. She mainly specialized in photography as one of her notable works is the Adansônia. She first studied metal engraving with the Universidade Federal do Rio Grande do Sul with Iberê Camargo.

== Biography ==
Mara Alvares was born in Porto Alegre, Brazil where she focuses her work on photography. In her early 20s she went to school to study metal engraving, which she later transition to study photography. From 1976-1978 she was involved with an artist group called Nervo Óptico, which helped organized exhibitions and discussions. Alvares helped produced pieces for the Nervo Óptico for months. In 1977 she introduced her Adansônia series, where it introduces her earlier work of the interaction of the body in photography and performance. In 1979-1982 she and eight other artist founded and directed the alternative cultural center Espaço N.O in Porto Alegre, a place for art experimentation and exhibitions. She is currently an assistant professor at the Universidade Federal do Rio Grande do Sul, in Porto Alegre.

== Education ==
She graduated with a bachelor's degree from the Universidade Federal do Rio Grande do Sul (1973), where she studied metal engraving with Iberê Camargo. She went back to school to specialize in photography and performance in art from the School of the Art Institute of Chicago (1980). She also received a Masters in Fine Arts from the Art Institute of Chicago (1993). Alvares is currently an assistant professor for the Universidade Federal do Rio Grande do Sul.

== Artworks ==
=== Adansônia Series ===
Adansônia is a genus of deciduous trees known as baobabs. Alvares Adansônia series explored psychological and intimate experiences of nature, created metamorphic and symbiotic relations with landscape, constructed ephemeral situations that symbolize the disappearance of cultures, expressed concerns about the effects of human activity on the earth, and depicted the body freely relating to the natural environment.

- Jogo de esconder em 6 toques (1976-1978) is one of the first part of the series as it includes the ocean with rocks all around all the images, as we see a body part of a person hiding from the rocks.
- Adansônia II (1976-1978) these six images appear to be at the beach as now we see a person face that the last image.
- Adansônia III is the last series as the setting seems to have more trees and vines as we see the person hug the tree.

=== Fotografia ===
This is a two part series that includes a ballerina (1977). Both images are black and white. The first image is a woman swatting down in the corner as her head is looking down. The second image we see the women face, but she is holding a rope to divide her face as one side of her face is darker than the other side. This was one of her earlier work as she was exploring the interactions of the body in photography and performance.

=== Epidermic Scapes ===
Two other artist participate in these series: Vera Chaves Barcellos (Porto Alegre, 1937) and Regina Silveira (Porto Alegre, 1939). This series were photographs of human body enlarged in close. They are epidermal landscapes and also an escape from an entire internal problematic. It’s the surface work, at the level of the epidermis.

== Exhibitions ==
- 1960-1985 Radical Women: Latin American Art at Pinacoteca de São Paulo
- 1977 Nervo Óptico, Galeria Eucatexpo, Porto Alegre, Brazil
- 1987 Connection Project/Conexus, Museum of Contemporary Hispanic Art, New York
- 2004 Mostra de Lançamento, Museu de Arte Contemporânea, Porto Alegre, Brazil
- 2008 Arte como questão: Anos 70, Fundação Tomie Ohtake, São Paulo
- 2015 Destino dos objetos | O artista como colecionador e as - coleções da Fundação Vera Chaves Barcellos, Fundação Vera Chaves Barcellos, Porto Alegre, Brazil

== Collections ==
Alvares work was being held in an exhibit at the Pinacoteca de São Paulo. The Pinacoteca has set up an Exhibition circle for 30 inspiring women artist, who pioneers in their field. They invited artist that reflect the spirit of the exhibition and deserved public recognition. Alvares and the other artist were referred to as "Extraordinary Women represents the feminine pioneering spirit and engagement in various areas of society", said Paulo Vicelli.

== Awards ==
- 1984, received the acquisition prize at the 7th Salão Nacional de Artes Plásticas, organized by the Fundação Nacional de Arte in Rio de Janeiro

== Bibliography ==
- Albani de Carvalho, Ana Maria. Espaço N.O., Nervo Óptico. Rio de Janeiro: Fundação Nacional de Arte, 2004.
- Bulhões, Maria Amélia. Artes plásticas no Rio Grande do Sul: Pesquisas recentes. Porto Alegre, Brazil: Editora da Universidade Federal do Rio Grande do Sul, 1995.
- Ferreira, Glória. Arte como questão: Anos 70. São Paulo: Instituto Tomie Ohtake, 2009.
- Scarinci, Carlos. Nervo Óptico: Carlos Asp, Clovis Dariano, Mara Álvares, Telmo Lanes, Vera C. Barcellos. Rio Grande do Sul, Brazil: Universidade Federal do Rio Grande do Sul, 1978.
