= Liliane Dardot =

Lilane Dardot
- Born: 1946 (age 79–80)
- Education: Graduate from Universidade Ferderal de de Minas Gerais

Liliane Dardot (born 1946) is a Brazilian artist, graphic designer, teacher, and political activist. She actively participated in the Oficina Guaianases de Gravura, an important art movement in Brazil. She is mostly known for her drawings in colored pencils, her works of lithography, and book illustrations.

== Biography ==
Liliane Dardot was born in Belo Horizonte, Brazil in 1946. As a young adult, along with studying art, she was involved in social and somewhat political projects, which concerned the impact on poor adolescents of the military dictatorship. Dardot attended school at the Escola de Belas Artes, Universidade Federal de Minas Gerais in Belo Horizonte, Brazil and graduated in 1968. Shortly following her graduation, she decided to teach drawing at the same school. She was a highly skilled student and professor, where teachers spoke highly of her. Dardot later taught at other universities, bringing her fundamental skills of drawing with her. After graduating in 1968, she began teaching art, more specifically, drawing. In 1977, she moved to Olinda, to continue doing art. Dardot began producing lithography joined the Oficina Guaianases de Gravura art movement.
