= Camila Soato =

Brazilian painter

Camila Soato (born August 15, 1985) is a Brazilian artist.

Soato was born in Brasília. She has a degree in fine arts from the University of Brasília. Soato lives and works in São Paulo.

In her work, Soato uses traditional oil painting techniques to create satirical images which depict bizarre situations.

Soato has had solo exhibitions in galleries in Rio de Janeiro, São Paulo and Brasília. Her work has been included in group exhibitions at the Paço das Artes, the Museu Afro Brasil and the Museum of Modern Art, Rio de Janeiro. In 2013, she won the PIPA Prize, which was chosen by popular vote.
