= Regina Parra =

Brazilian contemporary artist (born 1984)

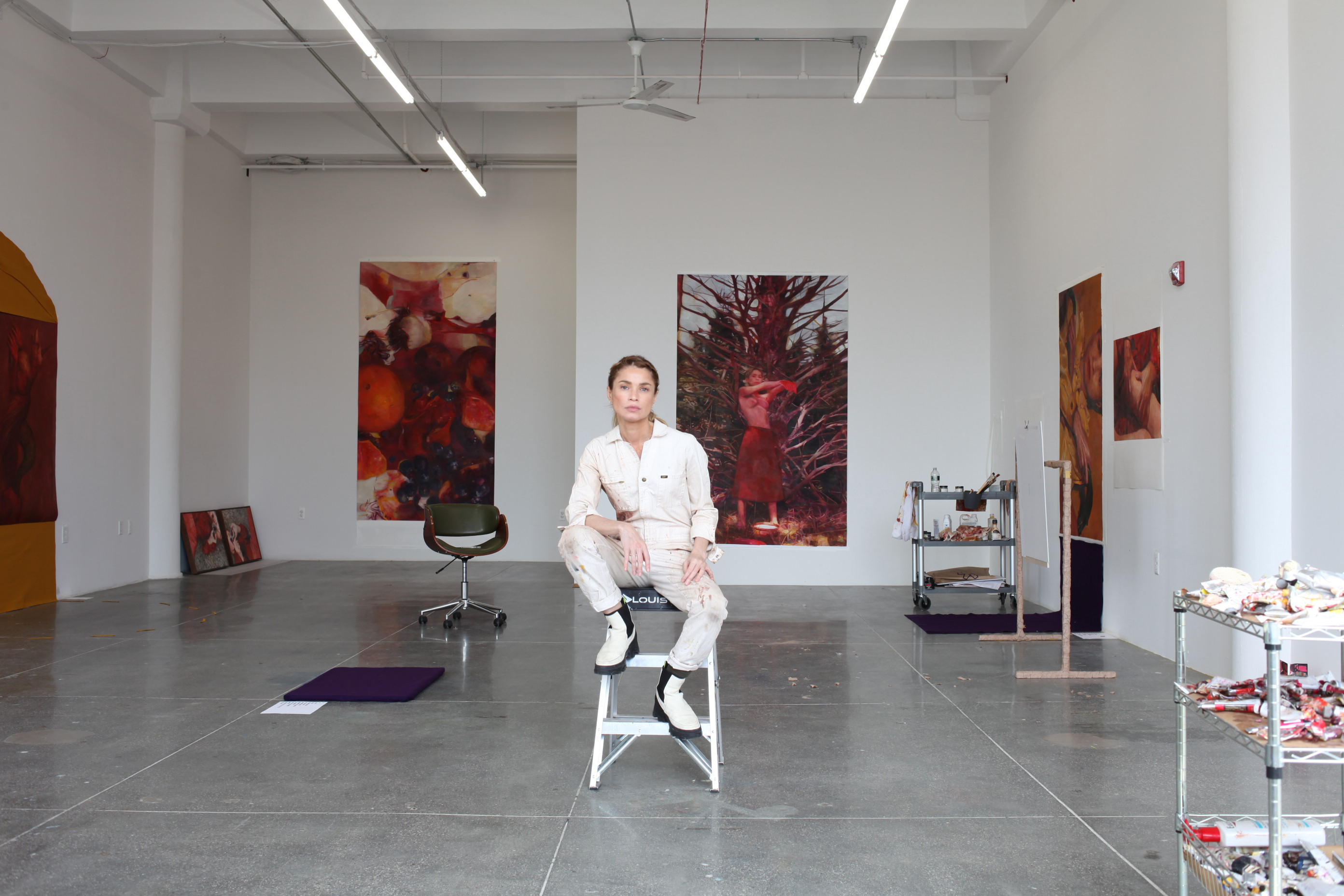
Regina Parra

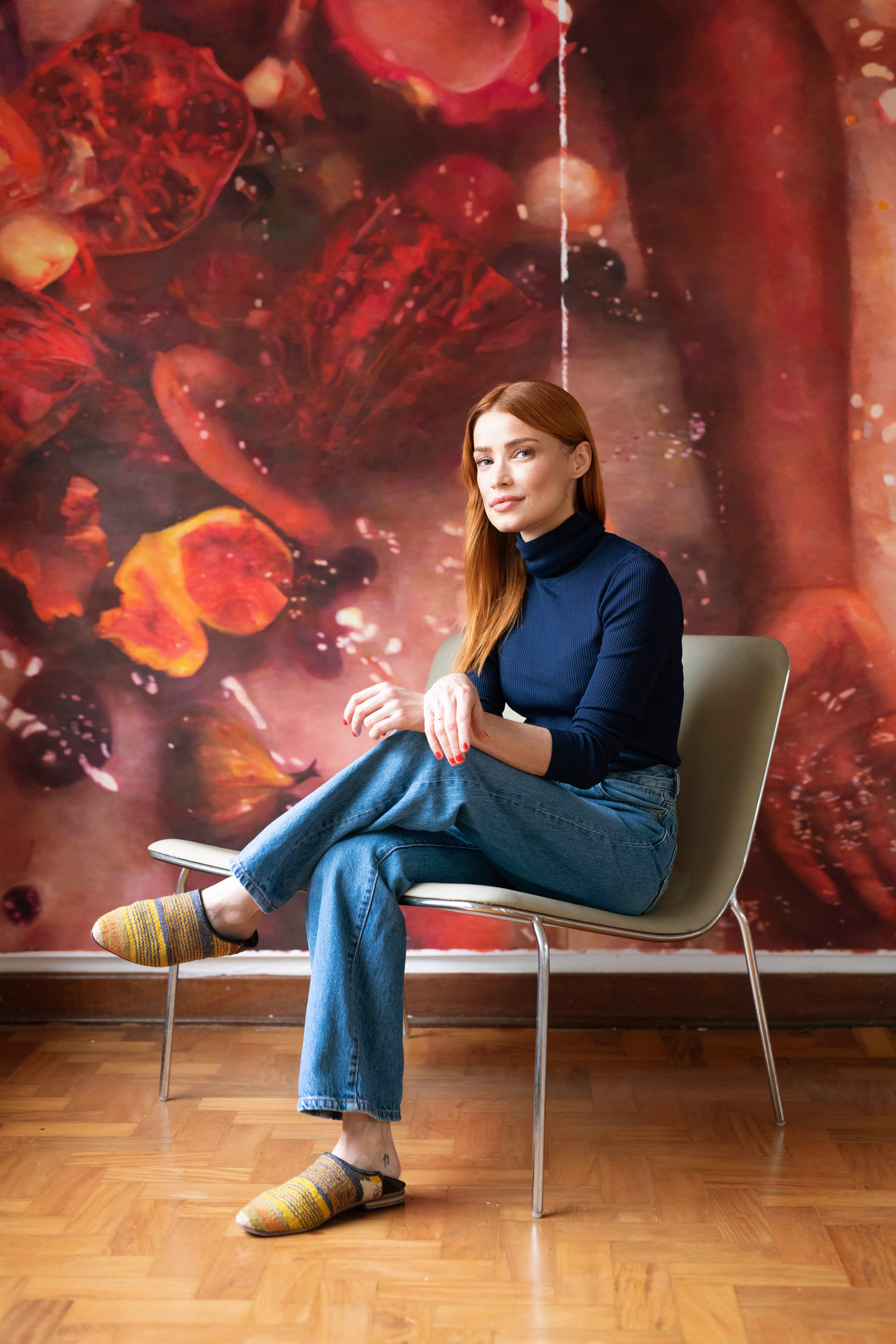
Regina Parra, artist portrait by Julia Thompson

Regina Parra (born 1984) is a Brazilian contemporary artist.

== Exhibitions ==
Regina Parra exhibited at Jewish Museum (Manhattan), Pablo Atchugarry Art Center (Miami), Mana Contemporary (Chicago), Shiva Gallery (NY), PAC_Padiglione d’Arte Contemporanea (Milan), On Curating Project Space (Zurich), Galeria Senda (Barcelona), MASP, Pinacoteca de São Paulo, MAM, Instituto Tomie Ohtake, Pivô, CCSP, Parque Lage, Paço das Artes, Fundação Marcos Amaro, Instituto Figueiredo Ferraz.

== Residencies and awards ==
In 2010, 2017, 2018 and 2019, Parra was nominated to PIPA Prize, Parra was awarded residencies including: Monira Foundation Residency Program, Mana Contemporary, New Jersey, The Watermill Center Residency Program, Watermill, Annex_B, New York, Residency Unlimited, New York, Pivô Residency Program, São Paulo, Red Bull House of Art, São Paulo.

== Collections ==
Parra's work is held in the permanent collections of the Museu de arte de São Paulo, and the Pinacoteca de São Paulo.
