= Marina Amaral =

Brazilian artist

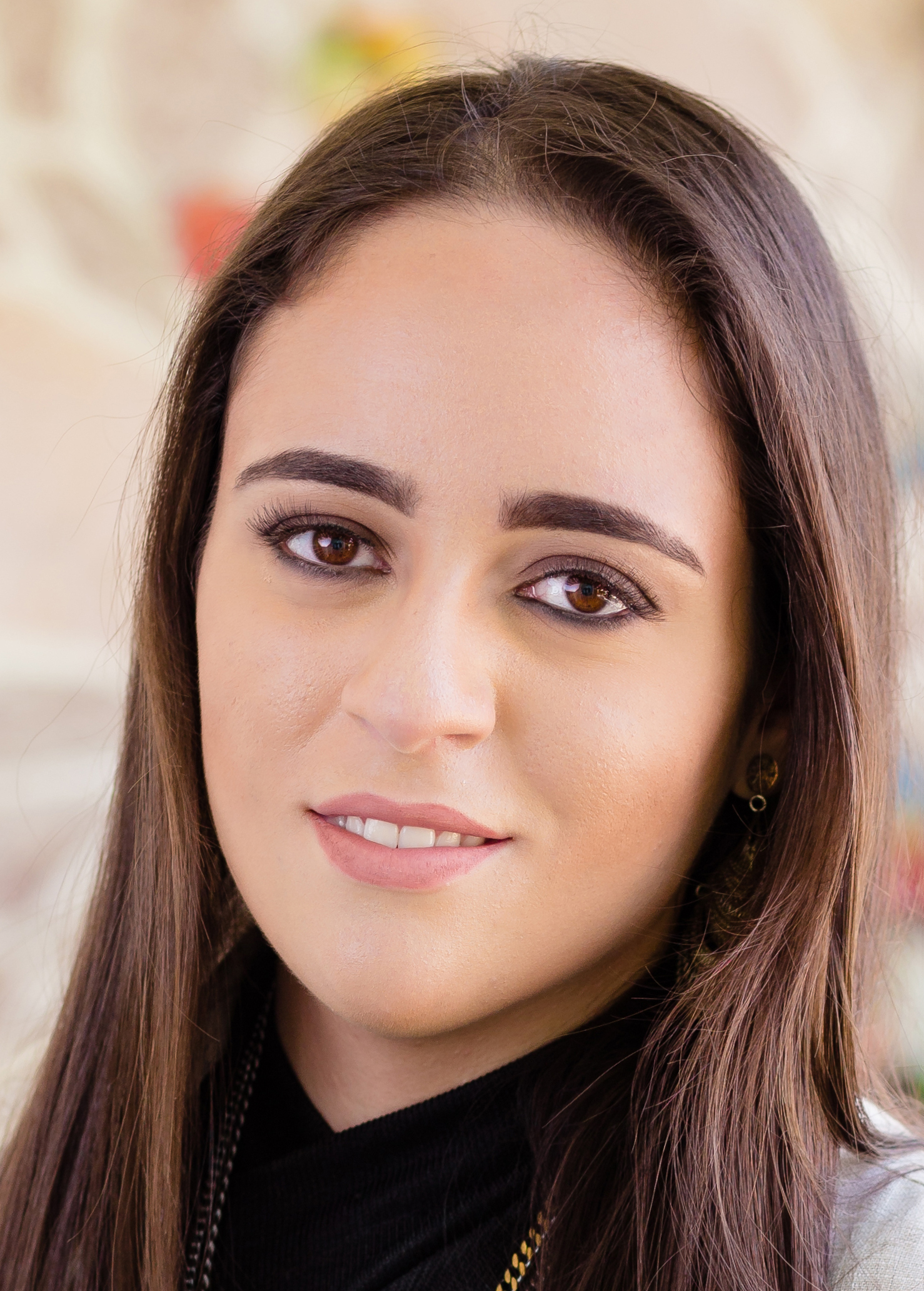
- Marina Amaral
- Born: 1994 (age 31–32); Belo Horizonte, Brazil
- Website: www.marinamaral.com

Marina Amaral (born in 1994) is a Brazilian artist known for her colorizations of historical black and white photographs.

== Work ==
A self-taught artist, she was an international relations student in college, but dropped out in April 2015 to pursue art full-time.

Amaral's creative process involves adding color to black and white photographs using Photoshop, following careful historical research to determine the colors of each object pictured. Amaral describes what she does as providing a "second perspective" as the pictures with color convey images that do not seem too far removed from the contemporaneous viewer. Her process of colorizing a photo can take as little as an hour or more than a month to complete. Each colorized photo may include hundreds of layers.

In 2017, Amaral was the illustrator for historian Dan Jones' book, The Colour of Time: A New History of the World, 1850–1960.

In 2018 Amaral colorized twenty archival photos of Auschwitz concentration camp prisoners, under the project title Faces of Auschwitz. The project was a collaboration with the Auschwitz-Birkenau Museum.

== Personal life ==
In 2020, Amaral was revealed to be on the autism spectrum.
