= Niobe Xandó =

Brazilian artist (1915–2010)

- Born: 1915; Campos Novos Paranapanema, São Paulo
- Died: 19 February 2010 (aged 94–95)
- Known for: Artist
- Style: Figurativism
- Movement: Avant-garde
- Spouse: Joao Baptista Ribeiro Rosa

Niobe Nogueira Xando Bloch (1915 – 19 February 2010) was a Brazilian artist.

== Biography ==
Niobe Xandó was born in Campos Novos Paranapanema, São Paulo, in 1915. Her parents were Antonio da Silveira Xando and Petonilha Nogueira Xando. Niobe lived most of her childhood in the interior of São Paulo by the countryside, but moved to the capital in 1932. At the age of sixteen she married a prominent communist militant, Joao Baptista Ribeiro Rosa. When she moved into the city, Niobe began attending the Communist Party meetings and met many many of the left-wing intellectuals and politicians of that time. In 1951, Niobe separated from her first husband and married Alexander Bloch, a Czech intellectual and scholar. Her husband had a vast culture that led to friendships with other intellectuals, one of whom was Vilem Flusser. Flusser wrote about Niobe's artwork in three articles, two of which were published in the arts newspaper. Through 1968–1971, Niobe and Alexander moved throughout Europe passing through Paris, London, and Stockholm. During this period, a music label in London asked Alexander Bloch for permission to use one of Niobe's works to illustrate the Rolling Stones album. The project fell through because Niobe had a quiet approach in her art and life. She settled in New York for six months in 1981 and 1983, after which she returned to Brazil in 1983. Niobe last works were from 1999, in large part due to her numerous health problems. She died in 2010.

== Artworks ==
Niobe transitioned through many styles of art throughout her career. Her art included figuratism, transitional works, flowers, masks, letterism, mechanism, abstractions, collages, reprography, and objects. In the 1950s, Niobe began her career as a figurative painter. She would paint childlike scenes, games, small local bars, and self portraits. She also began her paintings on tree trunks that was avant-garde at her time because it stepped out of the traditional paper. She abandoned figurativism in the later 1950s and began to embrace mythology that depicted mutating beings. Her masks were also predecessors of the surrealistic art that was inspired by ancestral cultures. Niobe began to create original and extravagant pieces using washers, rulers, compasses, and other unusual objects. This type of art was a movement called Mechanismo in which she approached a clash between archaic and contemporary art. It also demonstrated the conflict between humankind and machines. At the end of 1960, Niobe established a base for a new artistic manifesto that led to her letrismo. Letrismo was the break between the words and communication. Her last few works had returned to figurative paintings.

=== Flores Fantásticas ===
-Fantastic Flowers, 1963

-Oil on Canvas

-The flowers highly contrasted the old traditional flower paintings. It demonstrated the Pre-Columbian style by her use of the colors and ornamental arrangement. The art gives the impression that Niobe used a magnifying glass to enlarge certain aspects of the leaves and flowers. The amplified details depict unimaginable creatures from other dimensions. Niobe recalled the tropical nature of her childhood and devoted to the creation of strange flowerings.

=== Máscaras ===
-Masks, 1969

-Oil on Board

-Niobe entered her phase influenced by African, Aboriginal, and Pre-Columbian masks. Some masks appear out of plants as it is within Afro-Brazilian cults that manifest the orixás, higher beings of nature. The masks carry enigmatic images of ancient gods of her country, and are inspired by her ancestors to create graphic sings to represent symbols. They help express a historical development of her country, while accepting different cultures.

=== Joia-Objeto de Maryvonne Dubois ===
Maryvonne Dubois's Jewellery Piece

-Mechanismo

-Silver and Diamond

-Niobe confronts her country's traditional religious affiliations by using the modern mechanical constructions. Her images repeat but appear as if there is no connection connecting them together. She uses vivid colors and a stark black and white. The creations represent elements of a future world and describe a permanent symbolization of the world.

== Exhibitions ==
=== Solo exhibitions ===
1952: São Paulo, at Livraria das Bandeiras, in Praca da Republica.

-First solo Exhibition

=== Group exhibitions ===
1951: Bar Itapua, São Paulo

-Helped her consolidate her preference for painting

== Collections ==
- ZKM: Center for Art & Media

-works were featured in exhibitions and were offered in an auction.

== Bibliography ==
- Barros, Geraldo De, www.geraldodebarros.com/main/.
- Galvez, Rafael A. Rafael Galvez |, galvezbirds.com/tag/rafael-galvez/.Lima, W.A.

"Niobe Xando, Pinetre Bresilien." Presence Africaine, no. 70, 1969, pp. 191–192. www.jsotr.org/stable/24350238
