= Katie van Scherpenberg =

Brazilian artist (1940–2025)

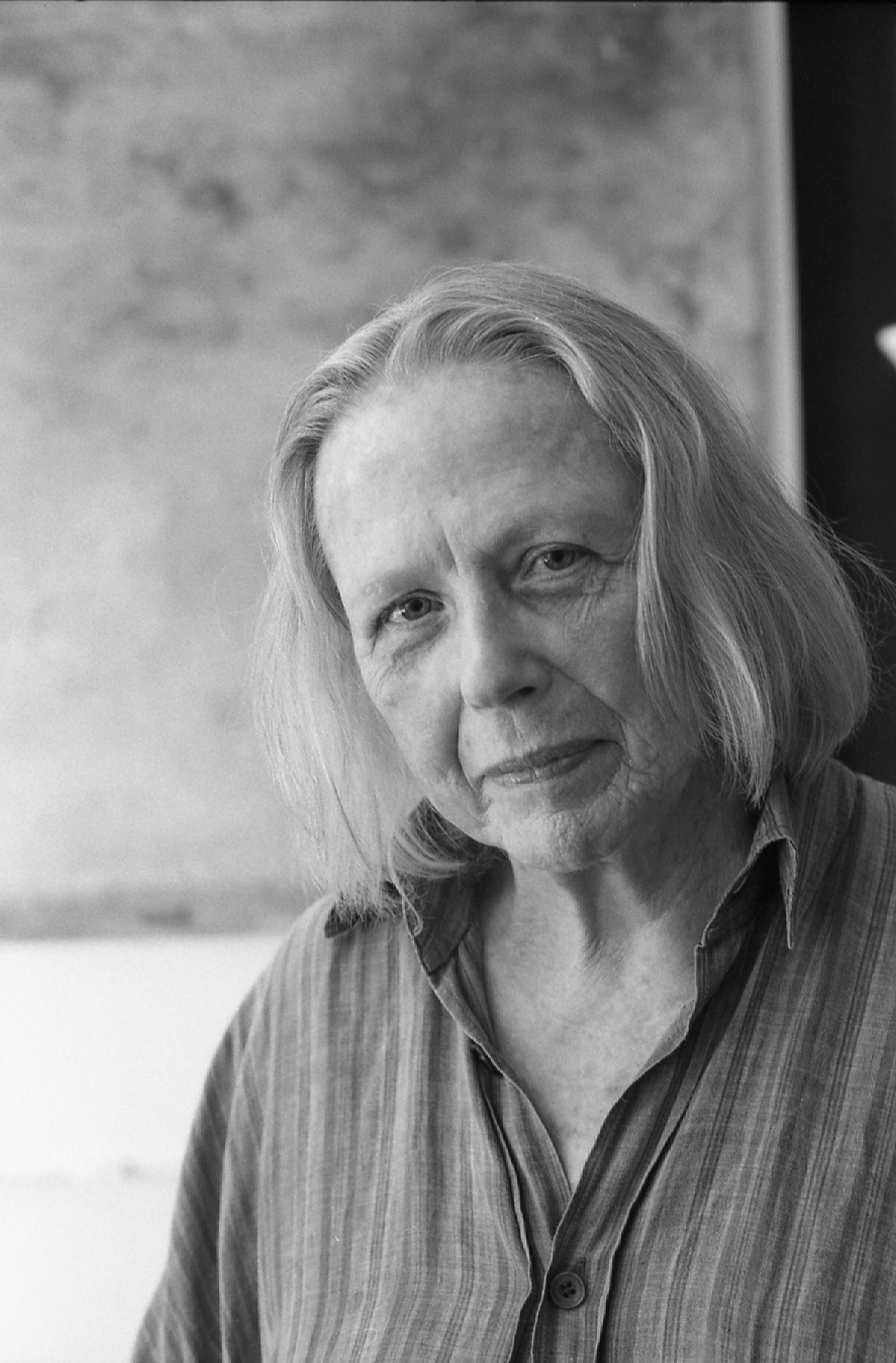
- Born: Mildrid Catharina van Scherpenberg; 1940; São Paulo, Brazil
- Died: 20 June 2025 (aged 84); Rio de Janeiro, Brazil
- Education: LMU Munich
- Occupation: Artist

Katie van Scherpenberg (1940, São Paulo, Brazil – 20 June 2025, Rio de Janeiro, Brazil) was a Brazilian artist.

== Biography ==
Van Scherpenberg studied at LMU Munich from 1962 to 1964. She studied under Oskar Kokoschka in Salzburg. In 1966, she studied printing at the Museum of Modern Art in Rio de Janeiro. From the 1980s onwards, Scherpenberg's work consisted of abstract painting. Her use of extreme materials contributes to the meaning of her works. Scherpenberg died on 20 June 2025, at the age of 84.
