= Lucia Nogueira =

Brazilian artist (1950–1998)

Lucia Nogueira (1950–1998) was a Brazilian artist specialising in sculptures and installations, video works and drawings. Her work often alluded to the body and was concerned with the relationship between objects and language.

== Biography ==
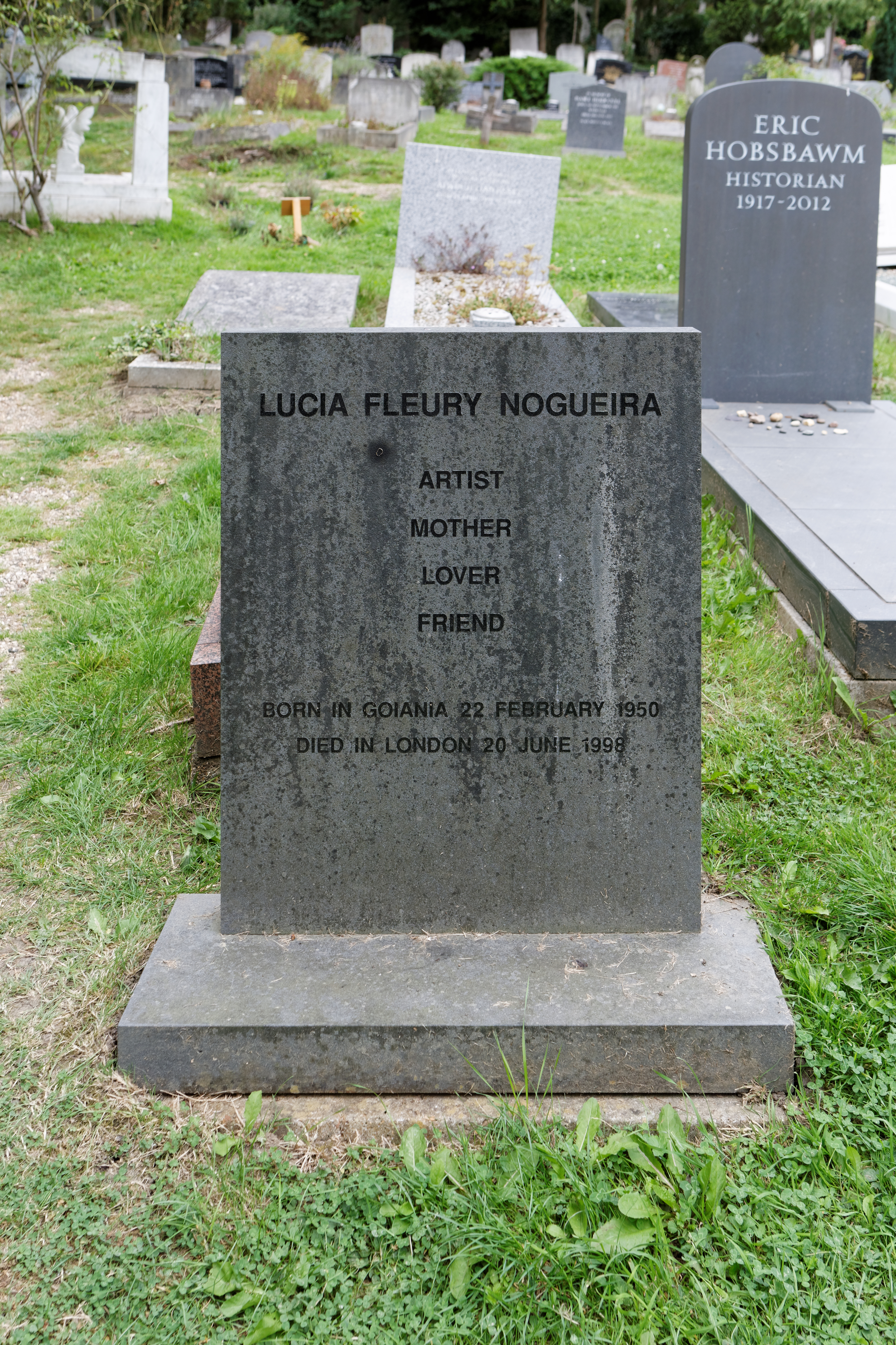
Nogueira's grave in Highgate Cemetery

Nogueira was born in Goiânia in central Brazil and was the eldest of five children. She studied Journalism and Communications in Brazil, and studied photography in the US before traveling to London in 1975. Planning to stay for just two weeks to visit her brother, she ended up staying for the rest of her life. In London, she studied painting at the Chelsea College of Arts from 1976 to 1979, then at the Central School of Art and Design from 1979 to 1980.

== Work ==
Nogueira's first solo exhibition was at the Carlile Gallery in London in 1988 and other shows soon followed at the Serpentine Gallery and the Chisenhale Gallery in London; the Ikon Gallery in Birmingham and at the Camden Arts Centre, London. A retrospective exhibition was staged at the Museu Serralves gallery in Porto in 2007. A focused presentation of her work was featured in the 33rd Bienal de São Paulo - Affective Affinities exhibition in Brazil in 2018. Her work is in the collection of the Tate, The Arts Council England, Leeds City Art Gallery, The Henry Moore Sculpture Trust, Museu Serralves and other international collections.

Nogueira was awarded a residency at the Fondation Cartier in Paris in 1993 and a Paul Hamlyn Award for Visual Artists in 1996.

"My way of thinking is very much from Brazil: My way of picking up objects comes from there too. It is something connected with childhood and also with the Brazilian psyche. Our way of thinking is not as linear as it is in Europe ... In art you obviously have a background in art history. We don't have that in Brazil at all. I think the way we developed our visual sense is different from the European model. I didn't have that. We just do everything in a very empirical way, even art."

She died of cancer aged 48 and is buried in Highgate Cemetery in north London.
