= Zina Aita =

Italian-born Brazilian artist

Zina Aita (1900–1967) was a Brazilian artist that practised early modernism within Brazilian culture. She worked hard with many artists in this time trying to captivate and enhance Brazil's unique culture to the public, something that was uniquely Brazilian. She participated in The Week of Modern Art. She practiced the early Brazilian modernism until she moved to Italy where she switched to watercolors and ceramics until her last days, dying from natural causes.

== Biography ==
Zina Aita spent most of her childhood in Naples, Italy. She was born in an art-driven family, surrounded by her Italian family's ceramic business. She moved to Brazil as she became an adult, by which time early modernism in Brazil was at its peak. She became very engaged in the movement and through the early modernist movement she moved heavily with multiple art techniques and styles, working with watercolors, tapestries, oil on canvas, drawing, and ceramics. She worked with modernism and participated in celebrations over Brazil's unique culture. Towards the end of her life, she moved back to Italy where she took over her family's business in ceramics.

== Career ==
Aita was heavily involved in the modernist movement in Brazil throughout her career along with many other artists. Early Modernism in Brazil consisted of a movement to bring a new and independent version of Brazil that was authentic and bold. Artists worked with modernism as a way to break away from and reject the academic art style.

In 1922, she participated in an art event called Semana de Arte Moderna (Week of Modern Art). The event was meant to highlight the modernist work that artists were doing in Brazil at the time. Many well-known artists like Tarsila Amaral, John Graz, and many more participated in this event.

Aita primarily worked with landscapes and self-portraits. Through these connections and her unique artwork, she was invited to participate in many art events.

== Exhibitions ==
- 1922 – Modern Art Week (São Paulo, SP)
- 1952 – Angelicum Exhibition (São Paulo, SP)
- 1954 – Contemporary Art: exhibition of the collection of the Museum of Modern Art of São Paulo (São Paulo, SP)
- 1972 – The Week of 22: antecedents and consequences (São Paulo, SP)
- 1979 – Portraits by Mario de Andrade (São Paulo), SP)
- 1982 – From Modernism to the Bienal (São Paulo, SP)
- 2010 – sp-arte (São Paulo, SP)

== Artworks ==
- Zina Aita. Men Working (1922)
- Zina Aita. Gardener (1922)
- Zina Aita. A Sombra. (c. 1922)
- Zina Aita. Estdo de cebeca. (c. 1922)
- Zina Aita. Paisagem. (c.1922)
- Zina Aita. Mascaras Siamesas (c. 1922)
- Zina Aita. Aquarium. (c. 1922)
- Zina Aita. Figura. (c. 1922)
- Zina Aita. Painel decorativo. (c. 1922)
- Zina Aita. 25 impressoes. (c. 1922)
- Zina Aita. Dois desenhos. (c. 1922)

== Semana de Arte ==
Aita participated along with several modern-day artists in Semana de Arte. Aita worked within this exhibition with artworks such as Men Working and Gardener.

Semana de Arte was a week exhibition in São Paulo, Brazil, where they celebrated modern art within Brazilian culture. This historical event highlighted multiple art forms such as dance, music, theatre, writers, and artist to share their creative sides to step away from the traditional way. This event gave artists a voice to share their impressions of Brazil and recognize a real Brazilian identity. This highlights the way Brazil came to be within finding their own style, opposing the academic art style. Semana de Arte meant to celebrate artwork that was uniquely Brazilian.
