= Isabelle Tuchband =

Brazilian artist (born 1968)

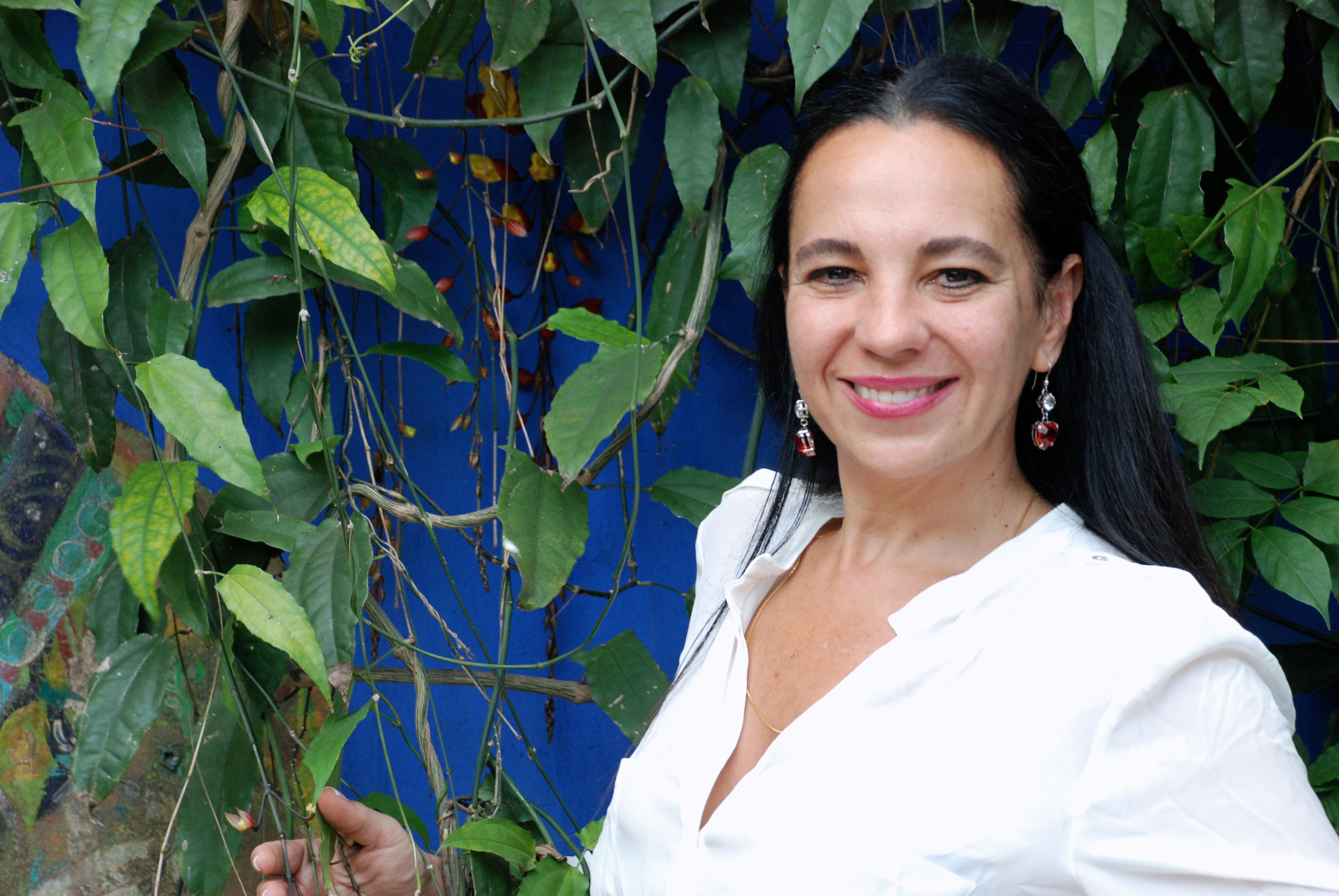
- Born: March 27, 1968 (age 58); Taubaté, São Paulo
- Known for: Painting
- Notable work: São Paulo Viva (panel at Santa Cruz subway station in São Paulo, 2006); J'aime Paris au mois de mai (2010); Gueixa Yoyô, 2011; Alma Plena (ceramic painting, 2013)
- Website: www.isabelletuchband.com.br

Isabelle Tuchband (born March 27, 1968) is a contemporary Franco-Brazilian plastic artist. She has taken part in a number of national and international exhibitions and developed several artistic projects, including a public masterpiece in São Paulo.

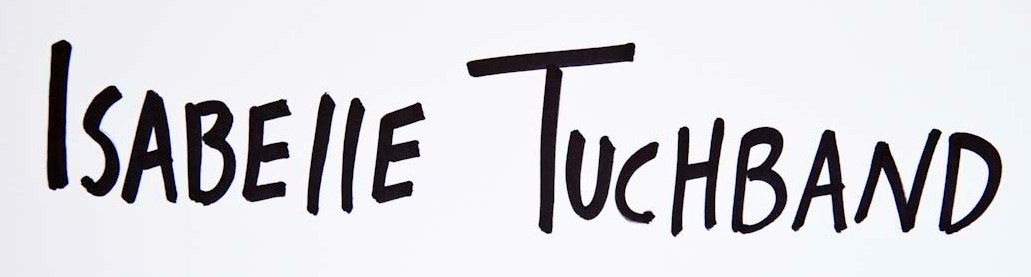
Isabelle Tuchband's signature

== Biography ==
Tuchband was born in 1968, in the city of Taubaté, and is the daughter of French painter Emile Tuchband (1933–2006) and Marlene Tuchband.

She has lived and worked in São Paulo since 1986, the year she left Taubaté to study plastic arts in São Paulo, at Faculdade Santa Marcelina. She studied plastic arts in France from 1988 to 1989, at École nationale supérieure des arts décoratifs, at Louvre Museum, in Paris. Back in Brazil in 1989, she opened Atelier Cité in São Paulo, with the plastic artist Verena Matzen.

In 1996, Tuchband created a public masterpiece with the panel São Paulo Viva at Santa Cruz subway station in collaboration with the artist Verena Matzen, in São Paulo. The 6.5 square metres (70 sq ft) mural consisted of 180 hand-painted ceramic pieces, installed with the collaboration of the architect Paula Pedrosa, Arte no Metrô project of the City Government of São Paulo. In 1999, her name was included in the Bénézit Dictionary (ed. Gründ, 1999), a reference dictionary of painters, sculptors, designers and engravers all over the world. Tuchband created fresco paintings to the company Unilever in São Paulo in 2004. In 2007, she was invited to create an artwork in celebration of the company O Boticário. The same year, her work O Amor Move o Mundo competed in Abril Journalism Award.

Tuchband launched her first book Será que eu sou assim? in 2008, at Museu Brasileiro da Escultura (MuBE) and at Pinacoteca do Estado de São Paulo. The book is an illustrated biography with several photographs of the works – paintings, sculptures and ceramics – interspersed with those of the artist herself in distinct phases of her life, thus telling what Tuchband used to do at that time. Resgatando Cultura project aims at registering and disclosing the work of art of Brazilian plastic artists, in addition to fostering cultural inclusion of people with special needs.

In 2010, she launched engraving boxes with Editora Buriti, at Livraria da Vila in São Paulo. The same year, she painted the mural at Bar d'Hôtel of Hotel Marina All Suites, in Rio de Janeiro. Tuchband painted the Chapel of Fazenda Borba Gato, in Vale do Paraíba and created a T-shirt collection to the store Bobstore and also a collection of canvas and ceramic pieces called 1001 Noites to the store Conceito Firma Casa, in São Paulo in 2011, and the same year, the bags of the store Tok&Stok were launched, with a reproduction of her work J'aime Paris au mois de mai.

Tuchband took part in the launch of the 2011 Fall-Winter collection of the store Diane von Fürstenberg, at Shopping Iguatemi, in São Paulo. During a trip to France, she carried out a mural painting at the house of the Dumetz family in Nice. In December 2011, her second book was launched called Atelier Cité — Paixões Declaradas/Professed Passions together with the artist Verena Matzen, in São Paulo. The book tells, by means of photographs and works, the history of Atelier Cité, fruit of great friendship and partnership between both artists.

In 2012, Tuchband created a jewelry collection called Gitane for the Italian designer Francesca Romana Diana, in São Paulo and in Rio de Janeiro, and was photographed by the American photographer The Selby.

In January 2013, she exhibited her works at WN Gallery in New York, a collective exhibition called The New Collectors Selection Exhibition by Basak Malone. She exhibited at Espaço Cultural Citi Bank, with the curator Jacob Klintowitz, during an exhibition called "Isabelle Tuchband e a narrativa primordial". She took part in the launch of the book Mitsubishi Motorsports 2013 and created an Easter Egg to Ferrero Rocher. An exclusive 3-liter bottle of Veuve Clicquot painted by the artist was auctioned by BrazilFoundation, during BrazilFoundation Gala São Paulo.

== Style ==
The bright color is an omnipresent element in the work of Isabelle Tuchband. The colorful canvas painted in acrylic usually represent women, flowers and enchanted worlds. Isabelle loves portraying people and families. She also uses collage on the surface of the canvas. Ceramic vases and plates are also part of the painter’s collections. When it comes to painting, her favorite source of inspiration is music.

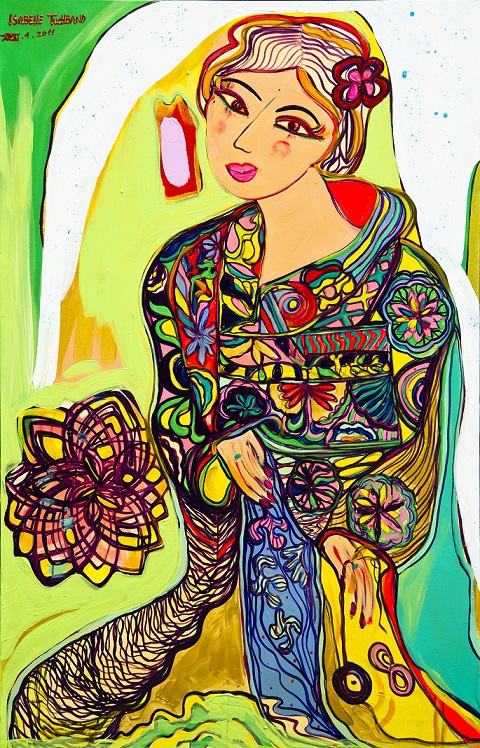
Gueixa Yoyô – 2011

== Works ==
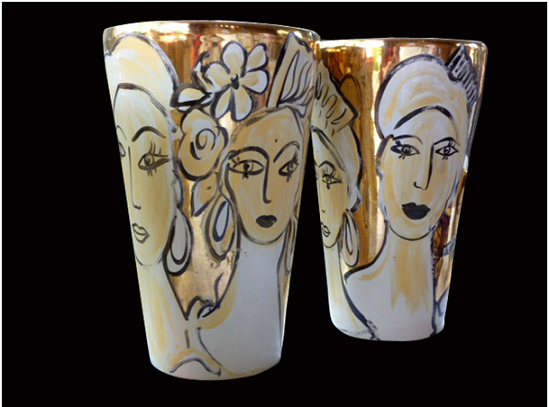
Ceramic vases

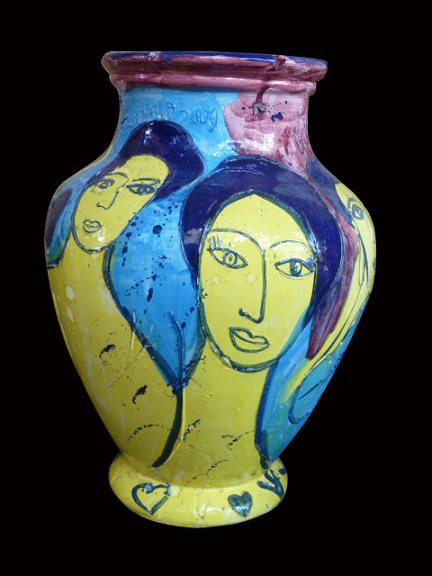
Ceramic vase

- Public art masterpiece São Paulo Viva at Santa Cruz subway station in São Paulo, ceramic panel, 1996.
- J'aime Paris au mois de mai, 92x73cm, 2010.
- Gueixa Yoyô, 90x140cm, 2011.
- 1001 Noites, 170x140cm, 2011.
- Menina com pandeiro, 71x88cm, 2011.
- Alma Plena, collection of ceramic vases, 2013.

== Exhibitions ==
- 1992 – São Paulo exhibition at Galeria Consolação, São Paulo para Todos project of the City Government of São Paulo.
- 1993 – Faianças individual exhibition at Banespa Museum, in São Paulo.
- 1994 – Exhibition at Café Design Tok&Stok, in São Paulo and Curitiba.
- 1995 – Exhibition at Banespa Museum, in São Paulo, and Loja Hum, in Rio de Janeiro.
- 1996 – Vase Vide exhibition at Casa Brasil-Espanha – Madrid, Spain.
- 1997 – Vase Vide individual exhibition at Galerie Landrot, in Paris, France. Exhibits at Museu de Arte Contemporânea de Campinas (MACC), São Paulo. Makes an exhibition called Artistes et Écrivains at L'Adresse Musée de La Poste, in Paris, France. Exhibits at Gaia ecological center, in Piracicaba, São Paulo. Makes an exhibition called Eles por Nós — Retratos at Atelier Cité, in São Paulo.
- 1998 – Artuelle collective exhibition in Beirut, Lebanon. Makes an exhibition with her father Emile Tuchband, called Tuchband & Tuchband at Galeria Casa das Artes, in São Paulo. Takes part in a collective exhibition called Vive L'Afrique at Musée de L'Homme, in Paris, France.
- 2001 – México Imaginário echibition at Centro Cultural Casa das Rosas, in São Paulo. Exhibits works at Galeria Cité in São Paulo, during an exhibition called Confiance et Sérénité.
- 2002 – Alma Paulista exhibition, in São Paulo. Takes part in a collective exhibition in Berlin, Germany. Makes an individual exhibition called Ma Vie at the venue Esfera, in São Paulo.
- 2003 – Individual installation at Bienal Pavilion, in São Paulo. Makes an individual exhibition called Voilá mon Coeur at Galerie Landrot, in Paris, France.
- 2004 – Individual exhibition at Canvas, Hotel Hilton de São Paulo, São Paulo. Exhibits works at the individual exhibition Fellini, at Centro Cultural Chakras, in São Paulo.
- 2005 – Exposition at Assembléia Municipal de São Paulo. Takes part in a collective exhibition at the venue Alumni Hall, in São Paulo and at Museu de Arte Moderna do Rio de Janeiro (MAM), in Rio de Janeiro. Individual exhibition at Roti, in São Paulo. Exhibition and launch of the book Voyage d'Amour, Maison Z, in São Paulo.
- 2007 – Individual exhibition O Amor que Move o Sol e as Outras Estrelas, in Lisbon and Cascais, Portugal.
- 2009 – Papa et moi no Museu exhibition at Museu de Arte Brasileira da Fundação Armando Álvares Penteado MAB-FAAP, in São Paulo, with works by Isabelle and her father Emile Tuchband.
- 2010 – Aba Sheli exhibition at the Gallery of Jewish Cultural Center, with works by Emile and Isabelle Tuchband, in São Paulo. Viens individual exhibition, at Galerie Landrot, in Paris, France. Amour, Délices et Lumières exhibition at the store Dominici, in São Paulo.
- 2012 – Continuar-me exhibition at ProArte Galeria together with the artist Verena Matzen, São Paulo.
- 2013 – Exhibition at WN Gallery, Basak Malone presents The New Collectors Selection Exhibition, New York City. Isabelle Tuchband e a narrativa primordial exhibition at Espaço Cultural Citi, with the curator Jacob Klintowitz, São Paulo.
- 2014 – Horizontes 4x4 collective exhibition for the launch of the book Mitsubishi Motorsports 2013, São Paulo. Exhibits works during À Vous individual exhibition at Hotel Negresco, Nice, France.

== Personal life ==
Tuchband has a son, Max Joseph born in 2005, with Joseph Catão.

== Bibliography ==
Bénézit, E. Dictionnaire des peintres, sculpteurs, dessinateurs et graveurs. Paris : Gründ, 1999. ISBN 2-7000-3010-9.
Finocchiaro, A. Será que eu sou assim?. São Paulo: Instituto Olga Kos, 2008. ISBN 8561189029.
Tuchband, I. & Matzen, V. Atelier Cité – Paixões Declaradas/Professed Passions. São Paulo : Luste, 2011. ISBN 856191405X.
Souza Ramos, Corinna.Mitsubishi Motorsports 2013. São Paulo: Ipsis Gráfica e Editora, 2014. ISBN 978-85-98741-51-2.
