= Escola de Artes Visuais do Parque Lage =

School of the arts in Rio de Janeiro

School of Visual Arts
- Escola de Artes Visuais do Parque Lage
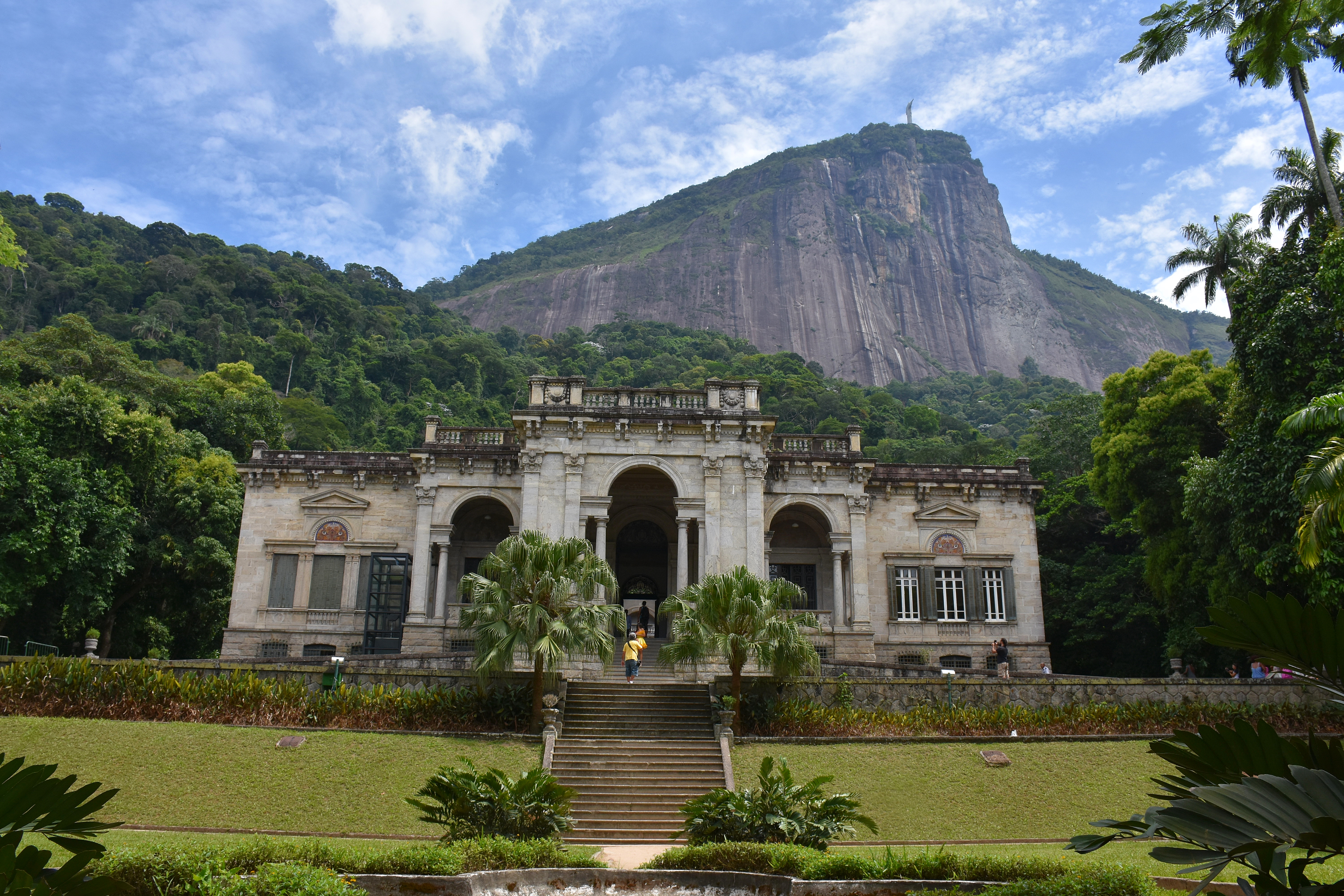
- EAV, with Christ the Redeemer visible at the peak of the mountain
- Established: 1975; 51 years ago
- Founder: Rubens Gerchman
- Location: Rio de Janeiro, Rio de Janeiro, 22461-000, Brazil; 22°57′34.6″S 43°12′43.51″W
- Website: www.eavparquelage.rj.gov.br
- Location within Brazil

The School of Visual Arts (Escola de Artes Visuais d Parque Lage - EAV) is a school for artists, curators, researchers and others in Rio de Janeiro. It is located within the Rio de Janeiro Botanical Garden.

== History ==
Created by Rubens Gerchman in 1975, EAV is located in an historic mansion built in 1920s by architect Mário Vodrei, .

EAV hosted the "Como vai você, Geração 80?" exhibit in 1984, the "Rock Brasil" series of shows. It has also staged Shakespeare's "The Tempest". EAV is considered to have been a center of resistance during the Brazilian military dictatorship.
