= Amelia Toledo =

Brazilian sculptor, painter, draftsman and designer

- Born: 7 December 1926; São Paulo, SP
- Died: 7 November 2017 (aged 90); Cotia, SP
- Website: http://ameliatoledo.com

Amelia Amorim Toledo (São Paulo, SP, 1926 – Cotia, SP, 2017) was a Brazilian sculptor, painter, draftsman and designer. With a career that expanded over fifty years, Toledo explored multiple artistic languages, techniques, materials, and production methods. She is considered to be one of the pioneers of Brazilian contemporary art.

== Life and career ==
The only child to Lucilia and Moacyr Amorim, Amelia Toledo was influenced as a teenager by her father's work as a scientist. In his lab, she learnt the principles of histology and of microscope manipulation, which ultimately inspired her explorations with color, shapes, and materials. Her interest with the natural world is reflected in her choice of materials (ranging from rocks, to seashells, to snails, to soap bubbles) and landscape representations. Toledo dropped out of high school to pursue a career in art. In 1939, she studied under the painter Anita Malfatti and begins working with watercolors. Inspired by constructivism, she started designing jewelry and objects in 1943. That same year, she worked as a dafter in the office of Vilanova Artigas, and started studying drawing and painting with Yoshiya Takaoka, who would tutor her until 1947. The following year, she took lessons with Waldemar da Costa.

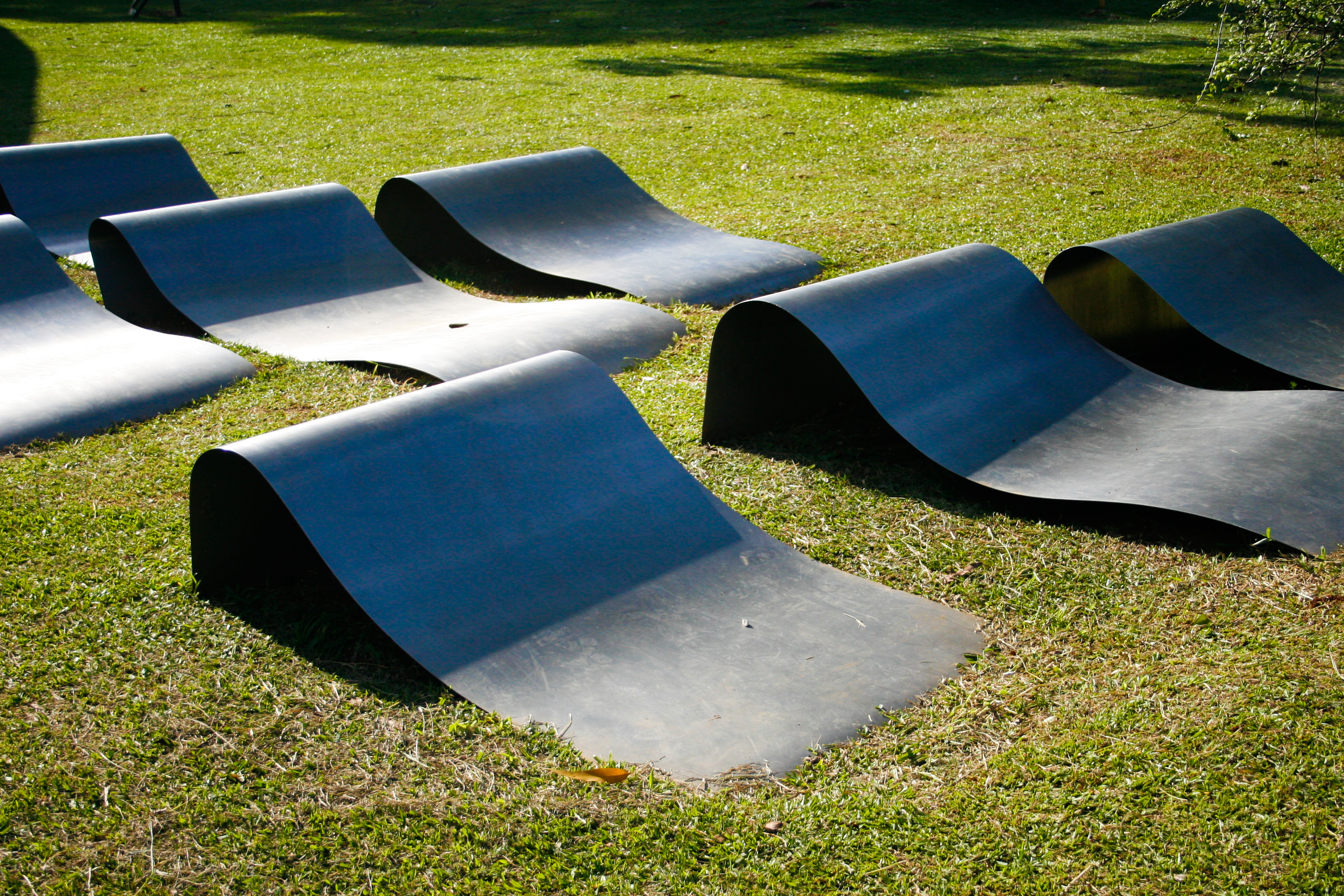
Amelia Toledo's sculpture "Sete Ondas", in front of the São Paulo Museum of Modern Art at Ibirapuera Park.

She had her first solo exhibit at the Galeria Ambiente, in São Paulo, in 1957, only a year before she moved to London to study at the Central School of Arts and Crafts. During that period, she had classes with William Turnbull, and started producing collages and kinetic objects, as well as her first artist book, "Gênesis".

Back in Brazil, she participated in the foundation of the Universidade de Brasília, institution that granted her a master's in art in 1964 and where she lectured in the early 1960s. She has also taught at the Sociedade Nacional de Belas Artes, in Portugal, from 1966 to 1967; at Universidade Mackenzie's School of Architecture and Urbanism, in São Paulo, from 1967 to 1968; at the Fundação Armando Álvares Penteado, also in São Paulo, from 1973 to 1974; and at the Escola de Desenho Industrial, in Rio de Janeiro.

During the 1960s, she studied metal engraving with João Luís Chaves, and started experimenting with two and three-dimensional sculptural works, using both natural and industrial materials. Her fundamentally experimental geometric, playful, and sensorial pieces of the time dialogue with the neoconcrete works of Lygia Clark and Lígia Pape. The latter was a close friend of Toledo, as were the artists Mira Schendel, Tomie Ohtake and Anna Maria Maiolino.

Since that period, Toledo participated in five different São Paulo Biennials. She has created public artworks for the cities of São Paulo and Rio de Janeiro, and has works in important private and public collections in Brazil.

Amelia Toledo died in her sleep in her home in Cotia, SP, on November 7, 2017.
