= Wanda Pimentel =

Brazilian artist (1943–2019)

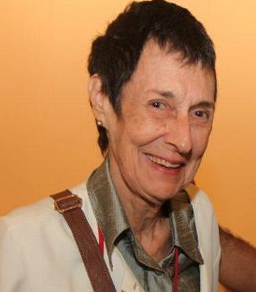
- Born: 1943; Rio de Janeiro, Brazil
- Died: 23 December 2019 (aged 75–76); Rio de Janeiro
- Education: Museum of Modern Art

Wanda Pimentel (1943 – 23 December 2019) was a Brazilian painter, based in Rio de Janeiro, Brazil. Her work is distinguished by "a precise, hard-edge quality encompassing geometric lines and smooth surfaces in pieces that often defy categorization as abstract or figurative." "My studio is in my bedroom," Pimentel said in an interview. "Everything has to be very neat . . . I work alone. I think my issues are the issues of our time: the lack of perspective for people, their alienation. The saddest thing is for people to be dominated by things."

Pimentel held her first solo exhibition in 1969 at Rio's Galeria Relêvo and went on to participate in the Seventh Paris Biennale and the Eleventh Bienal de São Paulo (both 1971) and "International Pop" at the Walker Art Center (2015). Her work is in the collections of the Modern Art Museum of Rio de Janeiro; the Contemporary Art Museum, Rio de Janeiro; The Latin American Art Museum of Buenos Aires; and Art Institute of Chicago. Her work was included in the Brooklyn Museum's 2018 exhibition "Radical Women: Latin American Art, 1960–1985."

She departed from her well-known Pop works when she created series titled "Bueiros" (Manholes) and "Portas" (Doors) in the late 1970s, "Invólucros" (Capsules) and "Linhas" (Lines) in the 1990s, "Animais" (Animals) in the 2000s, and "Memórias" (Memories) in the 2010s, among others.

== Early life and education ==
Pimentel was born in 1943. Her father died when she was 12 years old. She began painting around the age of 20.

In 1964, she began studying art at the Museum of Modern Art in Rio de Janeiro as a student of Ivan Serpa, one of the pioneers of constructivism in Brazil during the 1950s. Serpa founded and led Grupo Frente alongside Lygia Clark, Helio Oiticica, and Franz Weissman. He was known for his rigorous geometric abstractions. Under his influence, Pimentel developed her plain constructivist spatial organization as well as her consistent use of precise and straight lines in her artworks. Her smooth brushwork was inspired by the neofiguration period. During the 1960s, she experimented with different styles, such as pop art in the United States and England, nouveau réalisme in France, and neofiguration and new objectivity in Brazil.

== Selected artworks ==
=== Sem Título (Untitled), from the series Envolvimento (1968) ===
Medium: Vinyl paint on canvas

Wanda Pimentel primarily uses four colors in this painting: red, green, white, and yellow. There are two fragmented female legs as well as everyday objects. These include two chairs, a hair dryer, and an open purse which includes the following: a hair comb, lipstick, several bobby pins, a toothbrush, nail polish, and hair spray. They all appear to be in an indoor setting. There is a dual relationship represented in this painting: "it might seem that a young woman is simply making use of the world of objects, but at the same time the female body is objectified."

== Abstrato Verde (Green Abstract), from the series Envolvimento (1969) ==
Medium: Acrylic on canvas

In this painting, Wanda Pimentel uses two primary colors: green and red. There is a fragmented bare foot on a table in this painting as well as another table with kettles on it. The female appears to be in the kitchen, a place traditionally dominated by women. The way the female's foot is positioned suggests that she is merely watching as chaos ensues in the kitchen. The title of the artwork may be intended as subtle irony since Pimentel was never concerned with distinguishing figuration from abstractionism.

=== Sem Título, 1970 ===
Medium: Vinyl on wood

Continuing the theme of fragmentation, Wanda Pimentel uses wood pieces to represent fragments of urban life. This is one of Pimentel's experiments with using three-dimensional art to extend the range of geometric lines and indefinite spaces. This piece goes up three steps and is colored gray and black.

Art critic Frederico Morais wrote in 1979:

Wanda started running through the spaces of the house – bedrooms, bathroom, kitchen, living room — portraying in them objects that, soon, were seen as if from inside, radiographed or dissected: drawers, archives, falling plaster on the wall. And as if anticipating her contact with the outer world, she began to portray objects that also were means of communication: telephone, television, photographic cameras. And between timid and frightened, she one day opened the door to the street. Before, in a formal level, she had already moved from canvas to reliefs, cutting out of the very support the shape of the portrayed objects, thus arriving at the construction of "objects": door with doormats, staircases, corners of rooms and pieces of sidewalks, in which she introduces different kinds of manholes.

== Selected series ==
=== Envolvimentos (1968–1984) ===
The Envolvimentos (Involvement) series, which includes 27 paintings, remains the most iconic series of Pimentel's work. It is primarily made up of pieces created during 1968 and 1969, but the work continued until 1984. This series was seen as the "clashing of two irreconcilable references: lines and abstract, geometric shapes as well as the desire to represent the contemporary and everyday world in transformation as it is experienced and perceived." Wanda Pimentel questioned an "impersonal and mechanized world, in an epoch when mass media communications and the aesthetics of spectacle, embodied by television, had already declared victory over the silence of intimacy."

In the 1960s, art all around the world was used in mass media and consumer culture as well as in the women's rights movement. In 1968, Artur da Costa e Silva's military junta introduced the Institutional Act #5 (AI-5), which abolished the national legislature and prohibited every sort of political protest. In this context, Pimentel's Envolvimentos can be viewed as a subtle, yet critical, strike against the system.

Wanda Pimentel used "rich colors and surgical precision" in her Envolvimento paintings which include fragmented female bodies in domestic environments. The body parts are mixed with the interiors geometric shapes and lines. Her paintings do not have shading. She used everyday objects, furniture, and utensils like shoes, teapots, umbrellas, etc. to surround the fragmented body parts of women. She does this as a critical response to the mores of consumer society and of the sexual repression and misogyny of Brazil's military dictatorship. To avoid censorship from the AI-5, Pimentel used partly nude body parts and regular household objects to conceal the political messages the art represents.

=== Geometria/Flor (2015) ===
The Geometria/Flor series was created as a celebration of all the work Pimentel has done since the 1960s. Although this series is completely new, some paintings contain elements such as geometric forms and stairs that echo previous works. Pimentel focuses on her own personal memories, in some of which she is searching for memories of her father. She uses the color gold extensively in this series as a reference to Baroque art and as a reminder to celebrate life. She uses flowers in this series as well as shades of white and red.

The series also includes four works that Pimentel created in 1965 as a student of Ivan Serpa, which had never been shown previously. These drawings were made with a ballpoint pen and sheets of paper.

While creating this series Pimentel came across a poem by Fernando Pesseoa called "O Último Sortilégio" ("The Last Spell") that she included in her exhibition instead of a traditional critical text. Pimentel commented "The poem has a lot to do with these works. I wanted something sensitive, so I chose this poetry. Portuguese from Portugal is very dense, very beautiful when written. And my father was very fond of Fernando Pessoa".

== Exhibitions ==
=== Individual exhibitions ===
- 2017 MASP, São Paulo SP
- 2015 Geometria/Flor, Galeria Anita Schwartz, Rio de Janeiro RJ
- 2009 Linha, Anita Schwartz Galeria de Arte, Rio de Janeiro, RJ
- 2004 MAM Rio, Rio de Janeiro, RJ, e Galeria Manoel Macedo, Belo Horizonte, MG
- 2003 Layer of Brazilian Art, Faulconer Gallery, Grinnel College, Iowa, USA
- 2000 Projeto Zona Instável/Cavalariças, EAV Parque Laje, Rio de Janeiro RJ
- 1999 Paço Imperial, Rio de Janeiro RJ
- 1998 Galeria Thomas Cohn, São Paulo SP
- 1997 Paço Imperial, Rio de Janeiro RJ
- 1996 Galeria São Paulo, São Paulo SP
- 1994 CCBB Rio de Janeiro RJ
- 1987 Galeria de Arte BANERJ, Rio de Janeiro RJ
- 1987 Galeria Saramenha, Rio de Janeiro RJ
- 1975 Bolsa de Arte - Rio de Janeiro, RJ
- 1974 Galeria de Arte Global, São Paulo, SP
- 1973 Petite Galerie - Rio de Janeiro, RJ
- 1970 Petite Galerie - Rio de Janeiro, RJ
- 1969 Galeria Debret Paris, França e Galeria Relevo, Rio de Janeiro RJorizonte, MG

=== Group exhibitions ===
- 2017 Hammer Museum Radical Women Latin American Arte, 1960–1985 - Los Angeles
- 2017 Envolvimentos – MASP- São Paulo, SP
- 2015 Walker Art Center - International Pop - Minneapolis
- 2016 Dallas Museum Art, USA
- 2016 Philadelphia Museum of Art, USA
- 2016 International Pop, Philadelphia Museum of Art, USA
- 2015 Frieze Masters – Londres
- 2015 International Pop, Walker Art Center of Minneapolis e Dallas Museum of Art, USA
- 2015 X Bienal do Mercosul - Porto Alegre, RS
- 2015 ARTEVIDA, MAM Rio, Museu de Arte Moderna, Rio de Janeiro, RJ
- 2013 ‘O Colecionador Jean Boghici’ – MAR, Museu de Arte do Rio, Rio de Janeiro, RJ
- 2012 ‘MULHERES ‘– coleção João Sattamini e MAC de Niterói - Museu de Arte Contemporânea de Niterói, Niteroi, RJ
- 2011 ‘Gigante por la Propria Naturaleza’ IVAN – Institut Valencia d’Art Modern -Valencia, Espanha
- 2009 Nova Figuração anos 1960–1970 - MAM – Rio de Janeiro, RJ
- 2009 Coleção Gilberto Chateaubriand – MAM - Sala Permanente - MAM – Rio de Janeiro, RJ
- 2008 ‘Arte e Ousadia’ – col. João Sattamini - MAC Museu de Arte Contemporanea de Niterói - Niterói, RJ
- 2008 "Panorama dos Panoramas ‘ MAM – São Paulo, SP
- 2008 ‘Duas Faces do Brasil’ – Col. Gilberto Chateaubriand - MAM Rio de Janeiro, RJ
- 2008 -Mostra MAM 60 - "Oca"- São Paulo, SP
- 2008 Arte contemporânea e patrimônio - Paço Imperial – Rio de Janeiro, RJ
- 2007 ‘Paixão’ - Museu Artur Bispo do Rosário- Arte Contemporânea - Rio de Janeiro, RJ
- 2007 ‘Arte Como Questão/Anos70 - ‘Instituto Tomie Ohtake -São Paulo, SP
- 2007 ‘Auto-Retrato do Brasil’- Paço Imperial, Rio de Janeiro,’RJ
- 2006 ‘Manobras Radicais’ - Centro Cultural Banco do Brasil – São Paulo, SP
- 2006 Um Século de Arte Brasileira, Coleção Gilberto Chateaubriand Pinacoteca de São Paulo SP, MAM Rio de Janeiro RJ e Museu Oscar Niemeyer Curitiba PR
- 2006 ‘-Abrigo Poético ‘– Diálogos com Lígia Clark - MAC – Museu de Arte Contemporânea de Niterói, RJ
- 2006 -Aspectos da Coleção – 1960/1970 Arte Contemporânea: ‘Os Primeiros Anos ‘-Coleção Gilberto Chateaubriand - MAM –Rio de Janeiro, RJ
- 2006 ‘-O Que é Normal? - ‘Espaço Ecco’, Brasília, DF
- 2005 –‘Chroma -‘Museu de Arte Moderna – Rio de Janeiro, RJ
- 2005 -Aspectos da Coleção arte contemporânea:’ os primeiros anos ‘(Coleção Gilberto Chateaubriand) Museu de Arte Moderna – Rio de Janeiro, RJ
- 2005 -Anos 60/70 (Col. M.A.M. e Gilberto Chateaubriand) - Museu de Arte Moderna –Rio de Janeiro, RJ
- 2004 –‘O Preço da Sedução – Do Espartilho ao Silicone - ‘Itaú Cultural – São Paulo, SP
- 2003 -"Compressores e Condensadores " – Espaço Villa Lobos - Espaço Villa Lobos -Museu de Arte Moderna – São Paulo, SP
- 2003 -Autonomia do desenho – anos 70 (Col. Gilberto Chateaubriand) - Museu de Arte Moderna – Rio de Janeiro, RJ
- 2003 -Layers Of Brazilian Art Faulconer Gallery, Grinnell College– Iowa/USA
- 2002 -A Recente Coleção do Museu de Arte Contemporânea - MAC – Niteroi, RJ
- 2002 -Mapa do Agora: arte brasileira recente na col. João Sattamini do MAC/Niterói -Instituto Tomie Ohtake – São Paulo, SP
- 2002 ‘-Identidade’- o retrato brasileiro na coleção Gilberto Chateaubriand - Museu de Arte Moderna – Rio de Janeiro, RJ
- 2002 -Caminhos do Contemporâneo – 1952/2002 - Paço Imperial – Rio de Janeiro, RJ
- 2001 -Arte En América Latina (Coleccion Eduardo Constantini) - MALBA – Museu Latinoamericano de Buenos Aires - Buenos Aires, Argentina

== Collections ==
- 1993 -The Path of Niterói (Col. João Sattamini) – Paço Imperial- Rio de Janeiro, RJ
- 1984 -Retrato de un país (Col. Gilberto Chateaubriand) – Barbican Art Gallery – London
- 1999/2000 -Acervo MAM – A Selection – Museum of Modern Art- Rio de Janeiro, RJ
- 2001 – Art in Latin America (Eduardo Constantini Collection) – MALBA – Museum
- 2008 'Duas Faces do Brasil' – Col. Gilberto Chateaubriand – MAM Rio de Janeiro, RJ
- 2009 Gilberto Chateaubriand Collection – MAM – Permanent Room – MAM – Rio de Janeiro
- 2016 Art Institute of Chicago - Museum Chicago - USA
