= Anna Letycia Quadros =

Brazilian artist and educator (1929–2018)

Anna Letycia Quadros ( September 25, 1929 — October 30, 2018) was a Brazilian artist and educator.

She was born in Teresópolis and studied with Bustamante Sá at the Associação Brasileira de Desenho e Artes Visuais in Rio de Janeiro, with André Lhote, with Darel Valença Lins at the Escola Nacional de Belas Artes, with Iberê Camargo at the Instituto Municipal de Belas Artes in Bagé, with Oswaldo Goeldi at the Escolinha de Arte do Brasil in Rio de Janeiro and with Ivan Serpa. Quadros took part in the creation of the Grupo Frente with Serpa. In 1959, she attended a workshop at the Museum of Modern Art, Rio de Janeiro led by Edith Behring.

She taught engraving at the Museum of Modern Art in Rio de Janeiro from 1960 to 1966, where she especially studied engraving on metal also called metalcuts. She worked there with many other engravers who became also well-known, like Anna Bella Geiger and Ruth Bessoudo. She taught engraving in Santiago; in 1961, she was named an honorary professor at the Pontifical Catholic University of Chile. From 1977 to 1998, she taught an engraving workshop at the Museu do Ingá in Niterói. Quadros also worked as a scenery and costume designer for the stage, mainly with playwright Maria Clara Machado.

Her work has appeared in both solo and group exhibitions in Brazil and internationally. She participated in the 1959 Paris Biennale and the 1962 Venice Biennale.

In 1998, Angela Ancora da Luz published the book Anna Letycia.

In 2012, the Museu Nacional de Belas Artes held a retrospective of her work.

== Death ==
Anna Letycia Quadros died on October 30, 2018, in Rio de Janeiro.
