= Anna Maria Maiolino =

Brazilian contemporary artist

- Born: 1942 (age 83–84); Scalea, Calabria, Italy
- Education: Escola Nacional de Belas Artes, Pratt Institute
- Movement: New Configuration, Neo-Concretism, New Brazilian Objectivity, Minimalism, Conceptualism

Anna Maria Maiolino (born May 20, 1942) is a Brazilian contemporary artist.

== Early life ==
Maiolino was born in Scalea, in Calabria in southern Italy, to an Italian father and Ecuadorian mother. In 1954, her family emigrated to Venezuela, where she later attended Escuela Nacional Cristobal Rojas in 1958. In 1960, she and her family moved to Rio de Janeiro, Brazil. Here, she attended painting and woodcut courses at Escola Nacional de Belas Artes where she met artists Antonio Dias and Rubens Gerchman, with whom she would later participate in the early Brazilian art movements.

== Art Movement Involvement ==
When Maiolino was 18, she became involved in the early Brazilian art movements of the 1960s and 1970s; this included the New Configuration, Neo-Concretism, and the New Brazilian Objectivity movement in 1967, which shifted the nature of Brazilian art. While she was involved with the Brazilian Objectivity movement, she worked with many respected Brazilian artists, including Lygia Clark and Lygia Pape. During these years her paintings were viewed as resistances to the Brazilian military regime, as well as the country's growing urban inequalities.

== Works ==
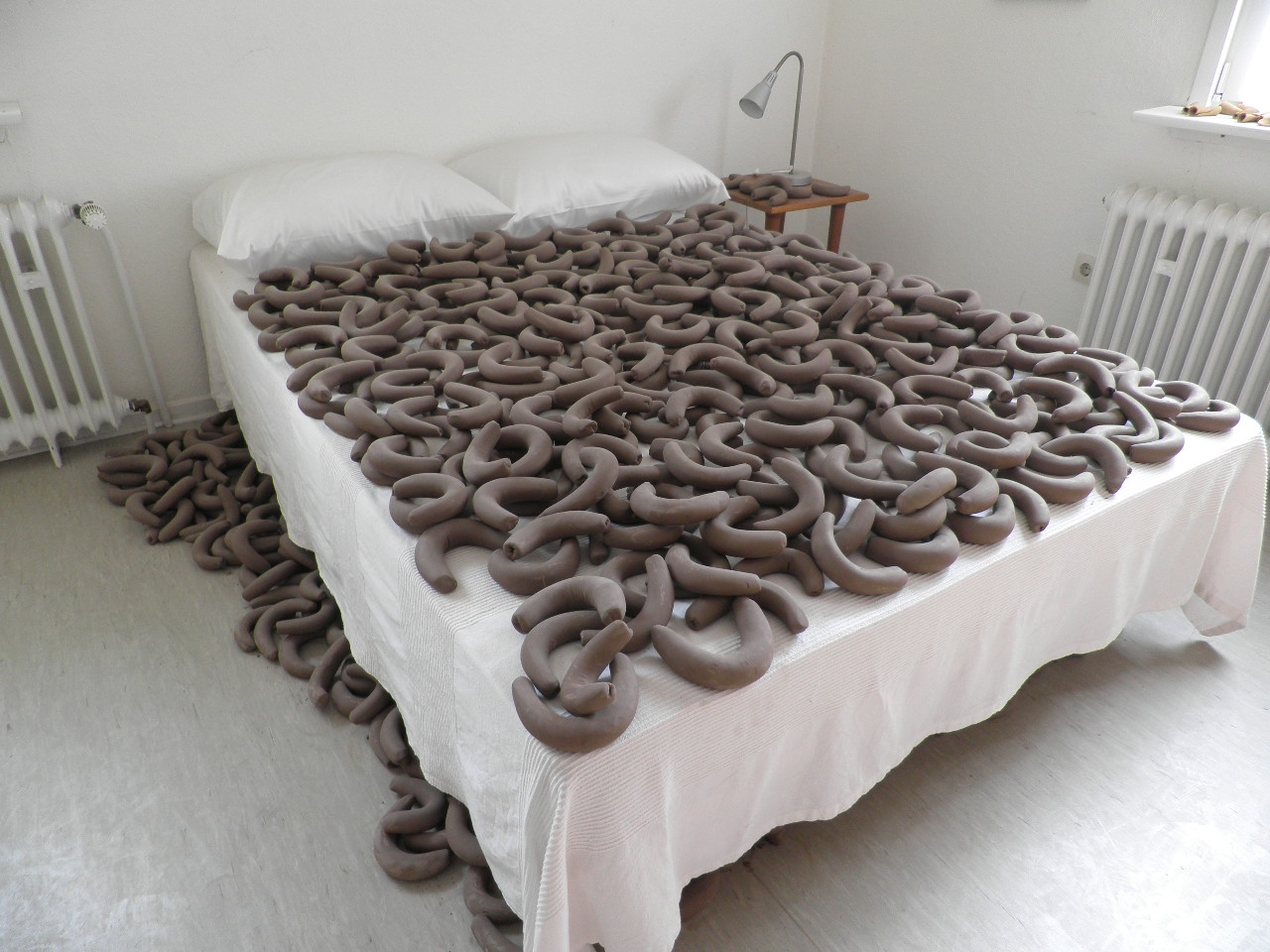
Maiolino occupation of former gardener's house rooms, basement and attic in the Karlsaue park (Kassel). Masses of modeled clay covering the furniture.

Maiolino showed her first solo exhibition of her woodcuts in 1967 at the Goeldi gallery. After becoming a Brazilian citizen, she moved to New York in 1968 to focus more on Minimalism and Conceptualism artwork; during this time she created works that influenced interaction between the object and the viewer. In mid-1971 she was granted a scholarship to attend the International Graphic Center Workshop at Pratt University because of the recommendation of Luis Camnitzer. While in New York, she turned to poetry as her primary mode of expression. After returning to Brazil in late 1971, she began to create drawings and text based compositions. Some of her work from those years include Mapas Mentais (Mental Maps) (1971–74), Book Objects (1971-76), and Drawing Objects (1971–76). From the mid-1970s and up until the 1980s she began working with Super 8 films, and other projects that encouraged performative interaction between the objects of art and audience. In 1989, she was granted the Mário Pedrosa Prize by the Brazilian Association of Art Critics for the best show of the year for her exhibition at the Pequena gallery, and began working with clay on the Modeled Earth series. In 1989, she began to use clay, cement, and plaster to sculpt wall-mounted sculptures. After this move, she has continued to explore the material through creating labor-intensive processes such as modeling, molding, and casting in references to recurrent gestures through a series of installations. Maiolino's drawings from the 1990s focused primarily on similar methods from her earlier exploration of materials and media. When she works with paper it becomes more than a drawing surface, but matter and body, which is visible in her 2006 drawing 'Untitled', which captures the poetic discourse that she is able to use through a simple gesture. In 1994 Maiolino received the "Os Melhores de 1993-Pesquisa de Linguagem (The best of 1993- Language research)" prize from the Association of São Paulo Art Critics for her exhibition, "Um, Nenhum, Cem Mil ("One, None, One Hundred Thousand") and was a part of the 1996 show of 20th century Women Artists: "Inside the Visible". In 2001, The Drawing center published a catalog entitled- A Life Line, and that same year her works were included in the MoMA collection.

== Recent works ==
Maiolino now lives and works in São Paulo, Brazil. In 2010, Maiolino had different art works from the past 30 years of her career displayed in an exhibition ('Continuum') at the Camden Arts Centre in London, England. One of the installations, made entirely from clay, is a symbol of everyday tasks, the individual, language and society. She created the piece by hand, rolling and molding the clay into 100 different shapes. More recent solo exhibitions include 'The Matrix 252', which is a selection of videos that use the body to express life when ruled by an oppressive government and 'Affections' (2014).

In 2012, she participated in Documenta 13 (Kassel, Germany) with the work Here & There, a site specific installation from the Modeled Earth series, composed of clay, sounds and plants. The same year, she won the MASP Mercedes-Benz Prize for Visual Arts 2012 for Best Contemporary Artist of the Year, which granted her a solo exhibition at MASP.

== Publications ==
- Anna Maria Maiolino, M Catherine de Zegher; Drawing Center (New York, N.Y.); Museu de Arte Moderna de São Paulo.; Paço Imperial do Rio de Janeiro New York : Drawing Center, 2002.
- Anna Maria Maiolino : order and subjectivity, Asbury, Michael. Nicosia, Cyprus : Pharos Centre for Contemporary Art, 2009.
