= Hélio Oiticica =

Brazilian visual artist (1937–1980)

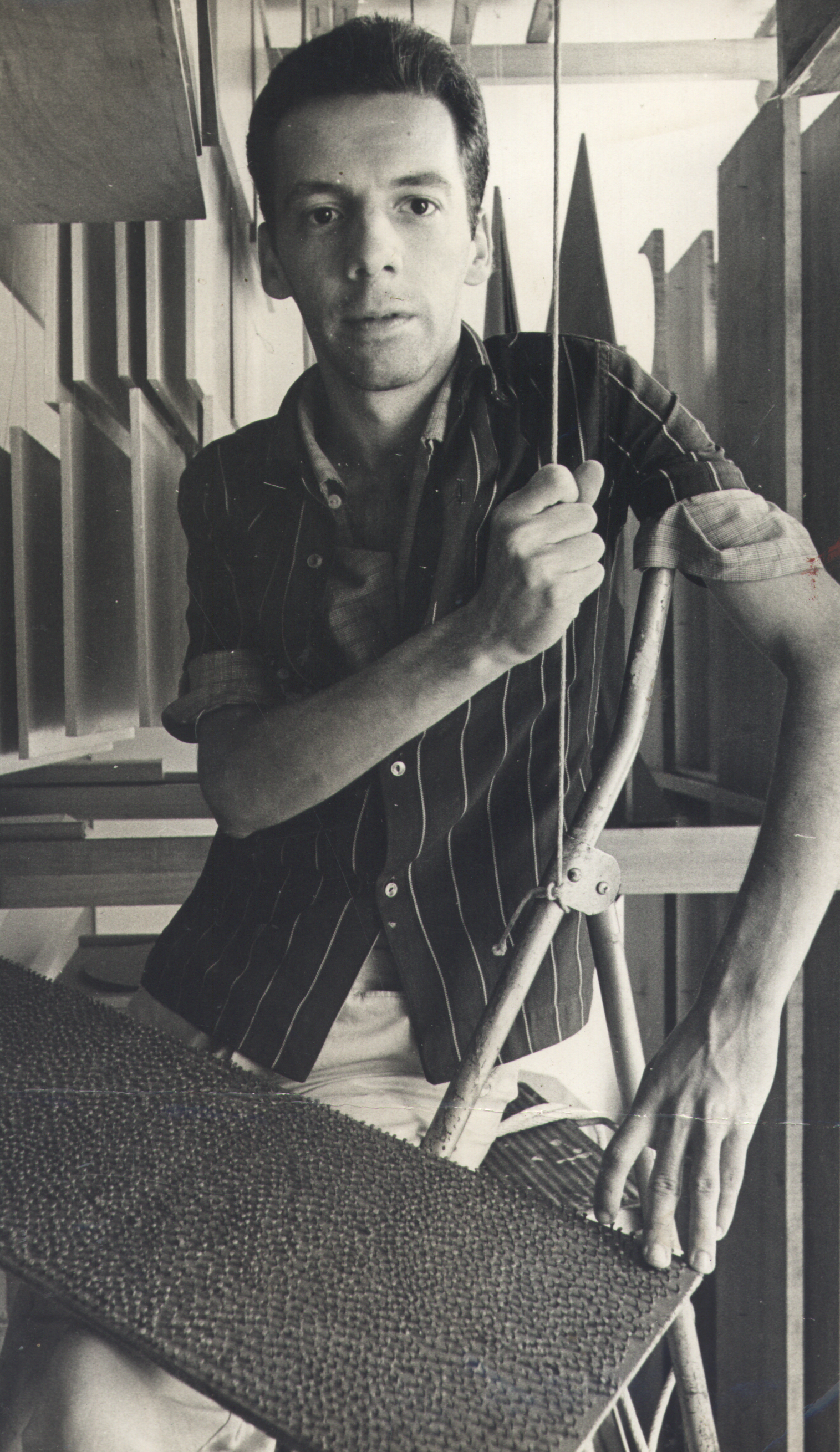
- Hélio Oiticica (1966)
- Born: July 26, 1937; Rio de Janeiro, Brazil
- Died: March 22, 1980 (aged 42); Rio de Janeiro, Brazil
- Other name: Passista
- Education: Museum of Modern Art, Rio de Janeiro
- Occupations: Visual artist, sculptor, painter, performance artist, theorist, filmmaker, writer
- Years active: 1954–1980
- Works: Metaesquemas; Bilaterals; Spatial Reliefs; Inventions; Bólides; Parangolés; Penetrables; Tropicália; Eden
- Movement: Neo-Concrete Movement
- Relatives: José Oiticica (grandfather)

Hélio Oiticica (Portuguese: [ˈεlju ɔjtʃiˈsikɐ]; July 26, 1937 – March 22, 1980) was a Brazilian visual artist, sculptor, painter, performance artist, and theorist best known for his participation in the Neo-Concrete Movement, for his innovative use of color, and for what he later termed "environmental art," which included Parangolés and Penetrables, like the famous Tropicália. Oiticica was also a filmmaker and writer.

== Early life and education ==
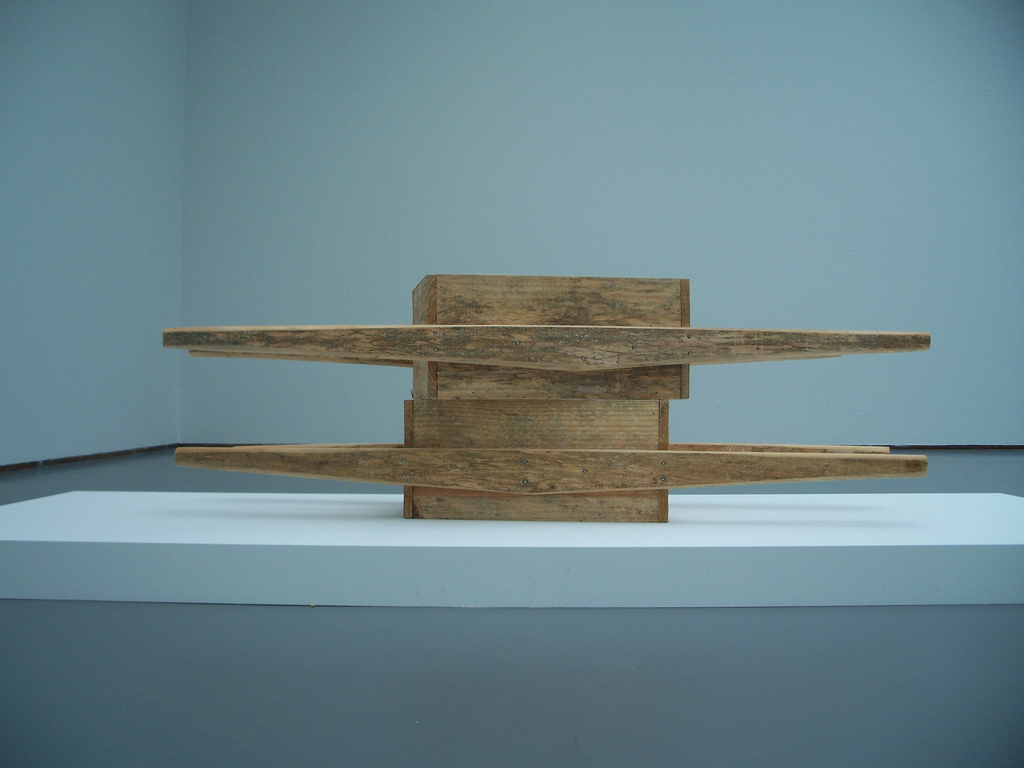
Bólides, Hélio Oiticica (1963-1969)

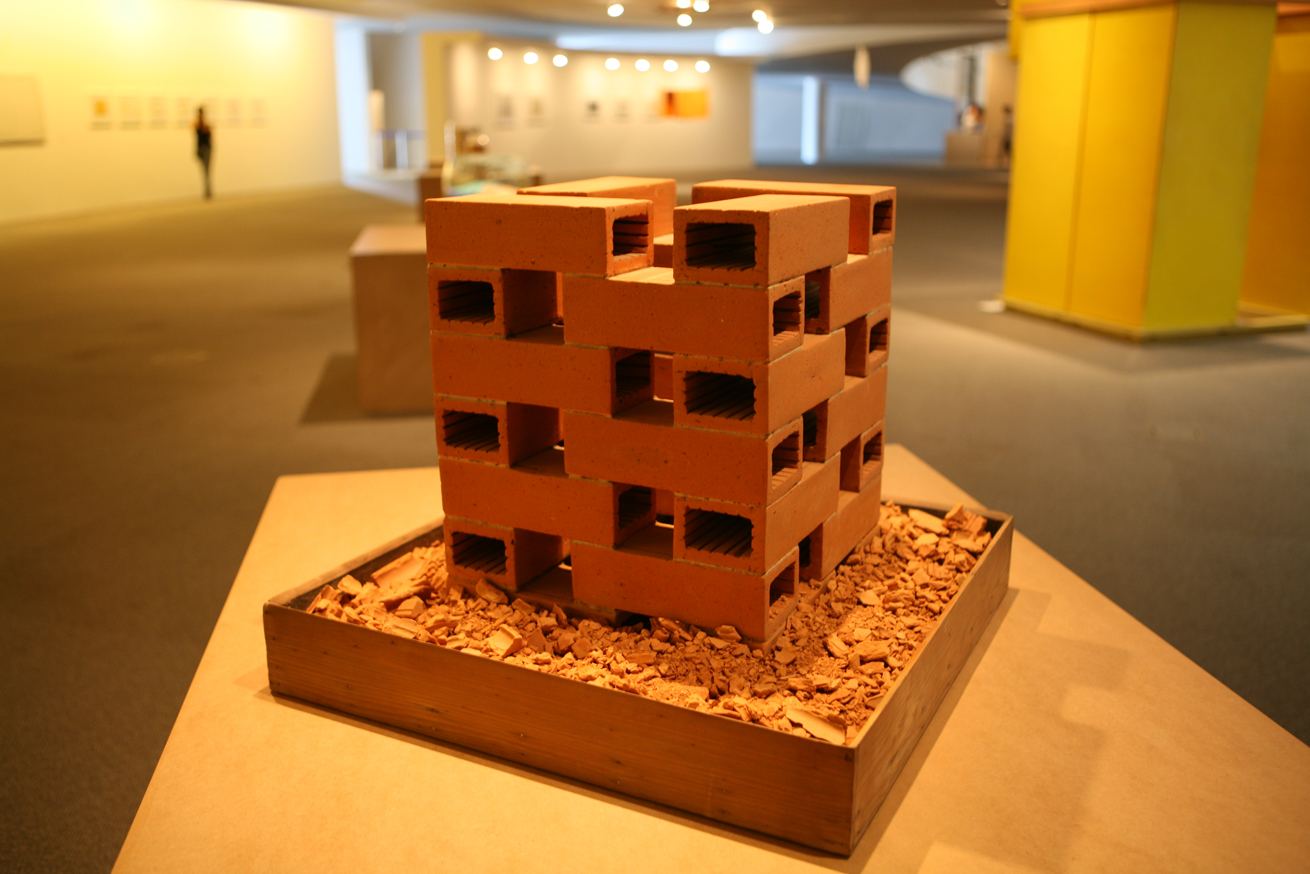
A exposição Hélio Oiticica – Museu é o Mundo (21 de dezembro 2010), no Museu Nacional Honestino Guimarães, em Brasília

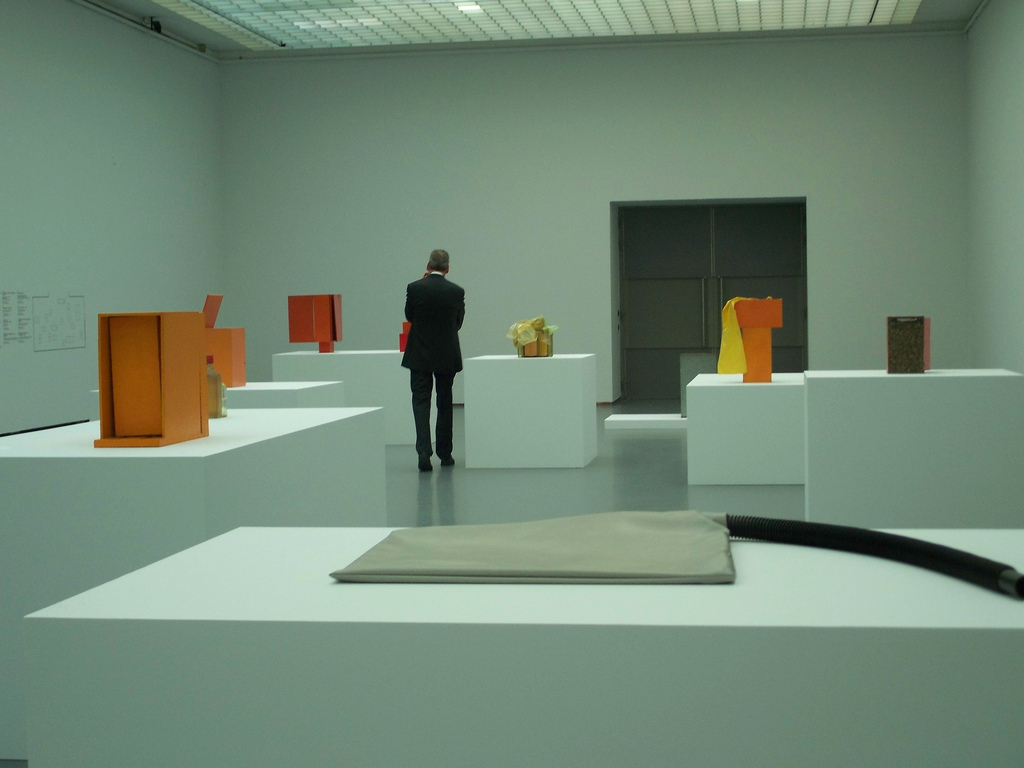
Bólides, Hélio Oiticica (1963-1969)

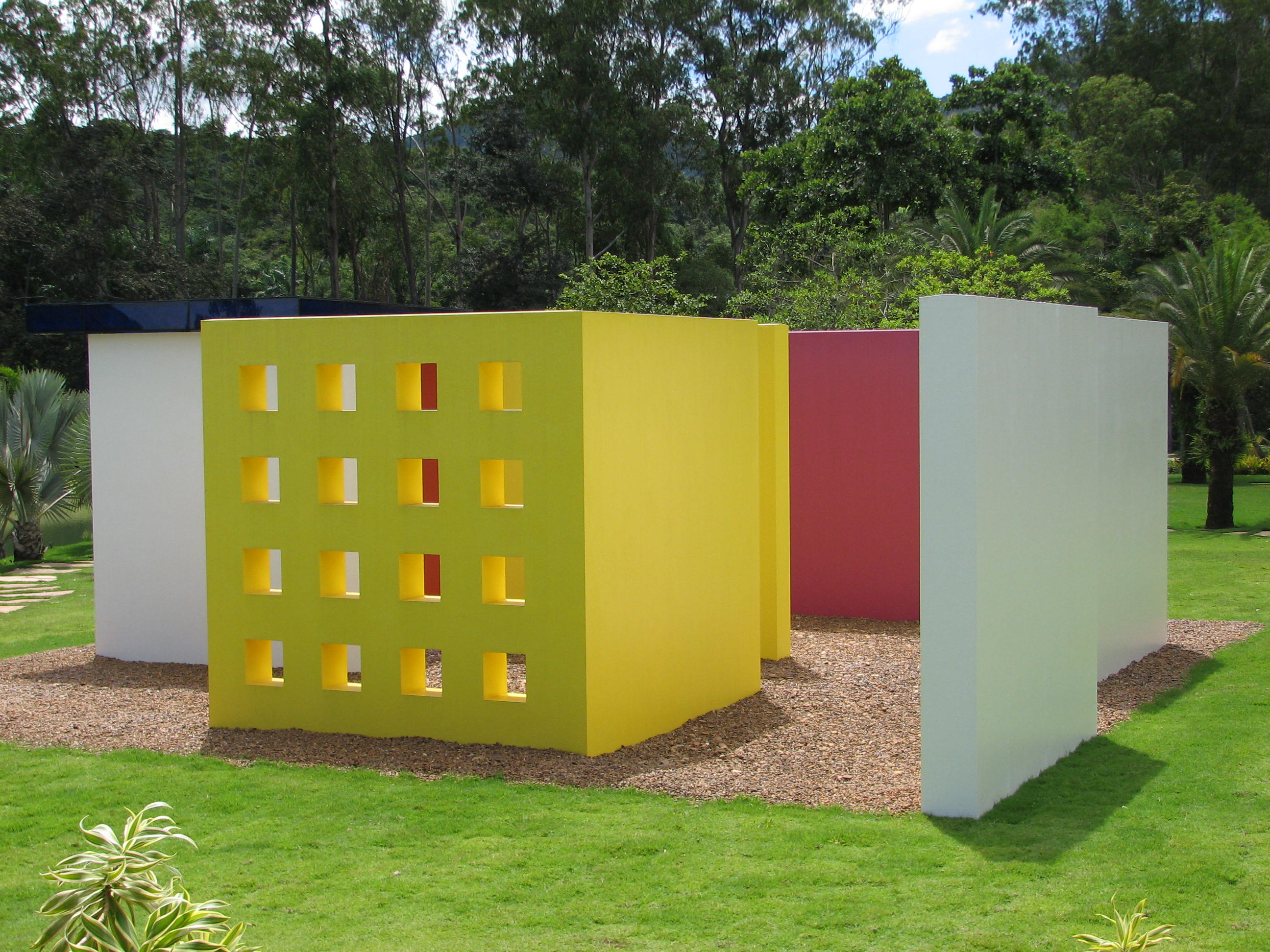
Brumadinho - Inhotim, Hélio Oiticica

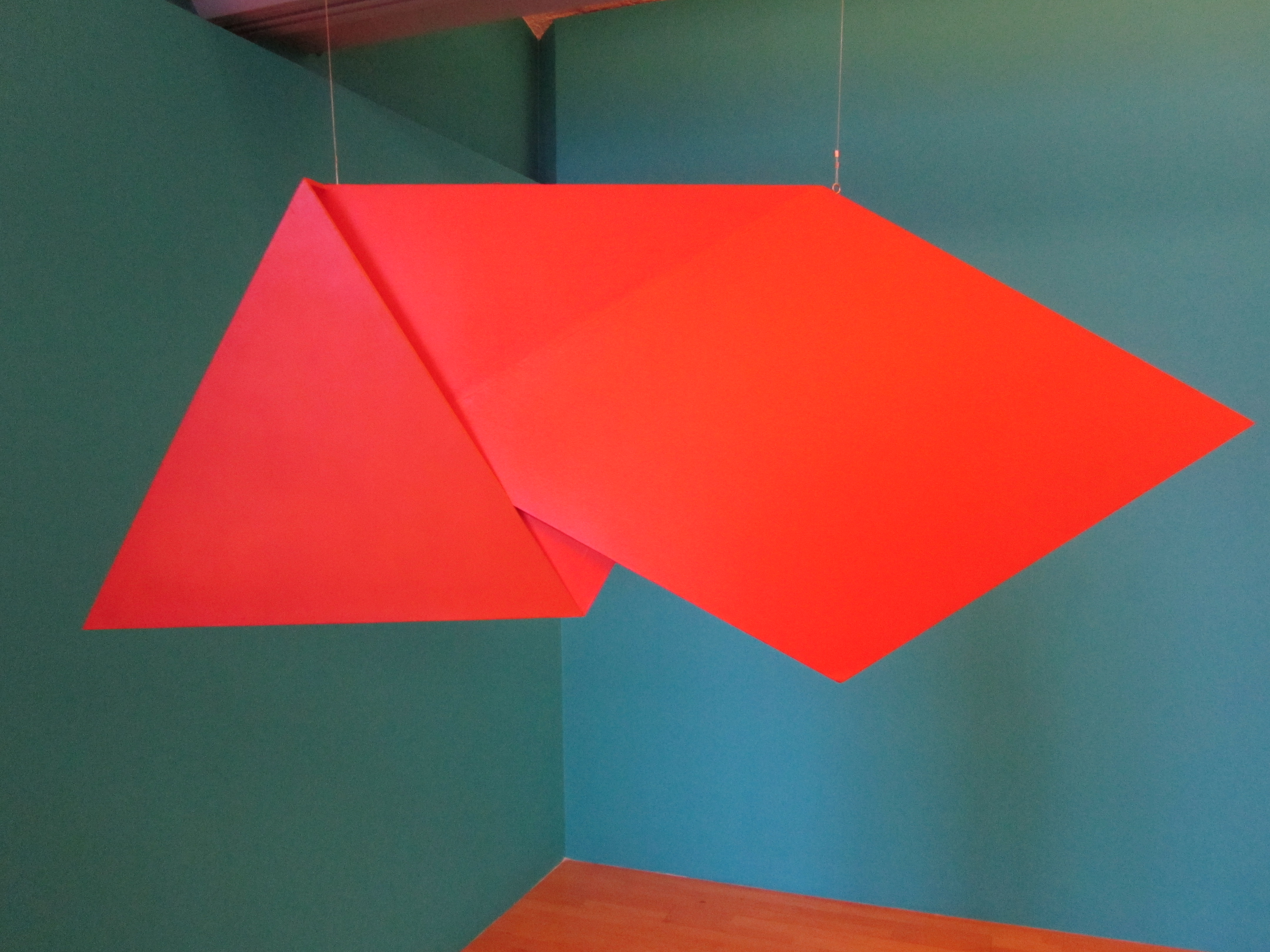
Spatial Relief (red) REL 036, Tate Liverpool

Oiticica was born in Rio de Janeiro, Brazil to mother Ângela Santos Oiticica and father José Oiticica Filho, Oiticia had two younger brothers (architect) César Oiticica and Cláudio Oiticica.

Oiticica's family was educated and involved in liberal politics. His father taught mathematics, was an engineer, entomologist, and lepidopterologist, a scientist who researched butterflies. He was also an avid photographer, creating experimental photographs that were new to Brazil. His grandfather was a well known philologist, who studied literary texts and written records, and published an anarchist newspaper called Ação Direta [Direct Action].

Oiticica and his brothers were taught at home until their father got a fellowship at the Guggenheim Foundation. During this time, from 1947 to 1949, the family lived in Washington, D.C. while their father worked at the National Museum of Natural History. Oiticica and his brothers attended Thomson Elementary School. The family returned to Brazil in 1950.

Oiticica enrolled in art school at the age of 16 years.

Starting in 1954, Oiticica attended courses at Museum of Modern Art, Rio de Janeiro, studying under Ivan Serpa. In 1955, he joined Grupo Frente.

== Career ==
=== Early career ===
Oiticica's early works, in the mid-1950s, were greatly influenced by European modern art movements, principally Concrete art and De Stijl. He was a member of Grupo Frente, founded by Ivan Serpa, under whom he had studied painting. His early paintings used a palette of strong, bright primary and secondary colours and geometric shapes influenced by artists such as Piet Mondrian, Paul Klee and Kazimir Malevich. Oiticica's painting quickly gave way to a much warmer and more subtle palette of oranges, yellows, reds and browns which he maintained, with some exceptions, for the rest of his life.

In 1959, he became involved in the short-lived but influential Neo-Concrete Movement. The Neo-Concrete Movement rejected the objective nature of Concrete Art and sought to use phenomenology to create art that "expresses complex human realities." This was stated in the manifesto written by Amílcar de Castro, Ferreira Gullar, Franz Weissmann, Lygia Clark, Lygia Pape, Reynaldo Jardim, Theon Spanudis and published in Rio de Janeiro in March 1959 called Manifesto neoconcreto.

Neo-Concretism focused on creating an awareness within the spectator of their spatial relationship with the artwork. The artworks themselves became akin to living organism rather than static forms; they were made to interact with viewers.

During Oiticica’s Neo-Concrete period, he sought to “escape the constraints of painting while remaining in dialogue with it” by utilizing color in new ways. He painted monochromes entitled Invencoes (Inventions) in 1959. These small square wooden plaques (30 x 30 cm) were not made to represent light rather Oiticica sought to embody it. Oiticica questioned traditional ideas of aesthetics and art practices by considering the spectator and ideas of real space in his work.

The group disbanded in 1961. Clark and Oiticica transitioned into conceptual art dealing with ideas of the human body and culture. Oiticica was specifically interested in what creates culture.

Color became a key subject of Oiticica's work and he experimented with paintings and hanging wooden sculptures with subtle (sometimes barely perceptible) differences in colour within or between the sections. The hanging sculptures gradually grew in scale and later works consisted on many hanging sections forming the overall work, as a spatial development of his first experiments with painting.

=== International recognition and later work ===
In the 1960s, Oiticica produced a series of small box shaped interactive sculptures called Bólides (fireballs) which had panels and doors which viewers could move and explore. Throughout the 1960s and 1970s he made installations called Penetráveis (penetrables) which viewers could step into and interact with. The most influential of these was Tropicália (1967) which gave its name to the Tropicalismo movement. He also created works called Parangolés which consisted layers of fabric, plastic and matting intended to be worn like costumes but experienced as mobile sculptures. The first parangolés experiences were made together with dancers from the Mangueira Samba school, where Oiticica was also a participant.

In 1965 he participated in the exhibition "Soundings two" at the Signals London gallery, with Josef Albers, Brancusi, Lygia Clark, and Marcel Duchamp among others. In 1969 he produced an individual exhibition at Whitechapel Art Gallery, London, curated by Guy Brett. Oiticica named the exhibition the “Whitechapel experience”.

In 1970 he participated in the exhibition "Information" at the Museum of Modern Art in New York City. During the 1970s, Oiticica increasingly devoted himself to writing and corresponded with intellectuals, artists and writers both in Brazil and abroad, including Haroldo de Campos, Augusto de Campos, Silviano Santiago and Waly Salomão.

After living in the East Village neighborhood of New York City, Oiticica had issues with immigration, which led to his return to Rio de Janeiro, where he died.

=== Tropicalismo Movement ===
The Tropicalismo Movement was a creative and artistic movement that began in Brazil towards the end of the 1960s. Oiticica played a huge role in defining the movement. The Movement emphasized music and art meant to celebrate Brazilian culture and identity. It was also a protest to the oppressive military government that severely limited artistic freedom of expression. Hélio Oiticica first coined the word “Tropicália” in the title of an artwork exhibited in Rio de Janeiro in 1967. Oiticica used the word to create irony around the stereotypes of Brazil as a tropical paradise. Once Brazilian musician Caetano Veloso used “Tropicália” for a song title in 1968, the Tropicalismo movement took form. Oiticica’s exhibit was a pop-up structure meant to look like favelas or slums. They were surrounded by palm trees, chairs fake vines and sand. Viewers of the exhibit were encouraged to walk in and around it as freely as they chose. It was meant to inspire free expression and oppose the political climate at the time.

=== Living in New York ===
Oiticica moved to New York in 1970 after he was awarded a two-year Guggenheim Fellowship in Rio. The fellowship was connected to his participation with the Museum of Modern Art’s exhibition of Conceptual art, “Information.”

When Oiticica first arrived in New York, he planned to create an installation in Central Park of his penetrable interactive paintings and sculptures first installed in Brazil. He envisioned bringing a piece of Brazil to Manhattan. The project was ultimately unsuccessful as he was unable to secure proper funding.

Despite the setbacks with the Central Park project, Oiticica published art in other ways. He took art classes at New York University and experimented with film photographs. One example of his published film is a set of photographs where he gives colorful capes (made from recyclable materials), called parangolés, to unsuspecting passengers on the NYC subway. The subway riders would examine the parangolés and Oiticica would photograph them trying it on. In a different film series, Oiticica photographs a young man standing in a parangolé on the rooftops of NYC buildings. The young man was Brazilian jiu jitsu master Romero Cavalcanti in 1972.

His most compulsive New York art project was his East side apartment. Oiticica, who was gay, felt a sense of sexual freedom and liberation in the city. He would host parties, often with rock music and drugs, and invite men to be photographed intimately.

Oiticica severely overstayed his two-year fellowship, remaining in New York for almost eight years. In that time, he faced difficulties finding connections in the art world to promote his work or resources to live in the city. It was also suspected he became slightly home sick. Facing disparity, Oiticica turned to drug dealing when he was unable to find consistent jobs.

=== Move back to Brazil ===
In 1978, Oiticica returned to Rio de Janeiro where he was berated by Immigration officials for overstaying his visa. According to his lawyer, Oiticica was also questioned about his homosexuality.

== Fire ==
On October 17, 2009, a fire destroyed an undetermined amount of the works by Oiticica. The collection was held at the residence of his brother César Oiticica in the neighborhood of Jardim Botânico, Rio de Janeiro. In addition to paintings and the famous Parangolés, the artist's archive of material included drawings, notes, documentaries and books, which were stored in the collection. The fire took three hours to bring under control. Key works such as Bólides and Parangolés, including some shown at the 2007 Tate retrospective, were damaged. The cause of the fire is unknown. The building was equipped with fire alarms and other safety systems. Jandira Feghali, Secretary of Culture in Rio de Janeiro, called for an investigation into the causes of the fire and whether any works can be recovered. The works were stored in César Oiticica's house following a dispute over money and the adequacy of storage facilities at the Centro Municipal de Arte Hélio Oiticica. The works were uninsured. A project of restoration is in development with the ministry of culture in Brazil.

== Personal life ==
Oiticica died on March 22, 1980 of a stroke as a result of hypertension.

Oiticica was openly gay.

== Awards ==
- 1969: Sussex University, Brighton, Resident artist
- 1970: Guggenheim Fellowship, Fine Arts: Latin America & Caribbean; Painting, Sculpture, & Installation Art

== Exhibitions ==
=== Group exhibitions ===
- 1960: "Konkrete Kunst." 50 Jahre Entwicklung, Helmhaus (Zurich) [traveling exhibition]
- 1967: "Nova objectividade brasileira." Museu de Arte Moderna do Rio de Janeiro (Rio de Janeiro)
- 1977: "Projeto construtivo brasileiro na arte. 1950–1962." Museu de Arte Moderna do Rio de Janeiro (Rio de Janeiro); Pinacoteca do Estado de São Paulo (São Paulo)
- 1984: "Tradição e ruptura. Síntese de arte e cultura brasileras." Fundação Bienal de São Paulo (São Paulo)
- 1987: "Modernidade. Art brésilien du 20e siècle." Musée d’art moderne de la Ville de Paris (Paris)
- 1988–90: "The Latin American Spirit. Art and Artists in the United States, 1920–1970." Bronx Museum of the Arts (New York) [traveling exhibition]
- 1989–90: "Art in Latin America. The Modern Era, 1820–1980." The Hayward Gallery (London); Nationalmuseum / Moderna Museet (Stockholm); Palacio de Velázquez (Madrid)
- 1992: "Bilderwelt Brasilien." Kunsthaus Zürich (Zurich)
- 1992–93: "Artistas latinoamericanos del siglo XX." Estación Plaza de Armas (Seville); Musée national d’art moderne, Centre national d’art et de culture Georges Pompidou (Paris); Josef-Haubrich-Kunsthalle (Cologne); The Museum of Modern Art (New York)
- 1994: Bienal Brasil Século XX (São Paulo) [traveling exhibition]
- 1994: XXII Bienal Internacional de Arte de São Paulo (Special Room) (São Paulo)
- 1998: XXIV Bienal Internacional de Arte de São Paulo (São Paulo)
- 1998: "Hélio Oiticica e a cena americana." Centro de Arte Hélio Oiticica (Rio de Janeiro)
- 1999: "The Experimental Exercise of Freedom. Lygia Clark, Gego, Mathias Goeritz, Hélio Oiticica and Mira Schendel." Museum of Contemporary Art (Los Angeles)
- 2000: "Heterotopías. Medio siglo sin lugar. 1918–1968." Museo Nacional Centro de Arte Reina Sofía (Madrid)
- 2001: "Geometric Abstraction. Latin American Art from the Patricia Phelps de Cisneros Collection." Fogg Art Museum (Cambridge, Massachusetts)
- 2001–2: "Brazil: Body & Soul." Solomon R. Guggenheim Museum (New York); Museo Guggenheim (Bilbao)
- 2002: "Além dos pré-conceitos. Experimentos dos anos 60." Museu de Arte Moderna (São Paulo)
- 2002: "PoT, 2nd Liverpool Biennial." Commercial Unit 6 (Liverpool)
- 2003: "Cuasi-corpus. Arte concreto y neoconcreto de Brasil." Museo de Arte Contemporáneo Internacional Rufino Tamayo (Mexico City); Museo de Arte Contemporáneo (Monterrey)
- 2003: "Geometrías. Abstracción geométrica latinoamericana en la Colección Cisneros." Museo de Arte Latinoamericano de Buenos Aires, Fundación Costantini (Buenos Aires)
- 2004: "Beyond Geometry: Experiments in Form, 1940s–70s." Los Angeles County Museum of Art (Los Angeles)
- 2004: "Inverted Utopias. Avant-Garde Art in Latin America." Museum of Fine Arts (Houston, Texas)
- 2005: "Colour after Klein: Re-thinking Colour in Modern and Contemporary Art." Barbican Art Gallery (London)
- 2005: "Open Systems. Rethinking Art c.1970." Tate Modern (London)
- 2005: "O lúdico na arte." Instituto Cultural Itaú (São Paulo)
- 2005–7: "Tropicália. A Revolution in Brazilian Culture (1967–1972)." Museum of Contemporary Art (Chicago); Barbican Art Gallery, London; Centro Cultural de Belêm (Lisbon); The Bronx Museum of the Arts." (Bronx, New York)
- 2006: "Cruce de miradas. Visiones de América Latina. Colección Patricia Phelps de Cisneros, Museo del Palacio de Bellas Artes, Mexico City
- 2006: Bienal del Aire, Museo de Arte Contemporáneo Sofía Imber (Caracas)
- 2006: XXVII Bienal Internacional de Arte de São Paulo (São Paulo)
- 2006: "The Sites of Latin American Abstraction." Cisneros Fontanals Art Foundation (Miami, Florida) [traveling exhibition]
- 2007: "Desenho construtivista brasileiro." Museu de Arte Moderna do Rio de Janeiro (Rio de Janeiro)
- 2007: "New Perspectives in Latin American Art." The Museum of Modern Art (New York)
- 2007: "The Geometry of Hope. Latin American Abstract Art from the Patricia Phelps de Cisneros Collection." Blanton Museum of Art, The University of Texas at Austin (Austin, Texas); Grey Art Gallery, New York University (New York)
- 2008: "Face to Face. The Daros Collections." Daros Latinamerica Collection (Zurich)
- 2008: "Time & Place. Rio de Janeiro 1956–1964." Moderna Museet (Stockholm)
- 2008: Biennale of Sidney (Sidney)
- 2008–9: "Neo Tropicália. When Lives Become Form: Contemporary Brazilian Art, 1960s to the present." Museum of Contemporary Art (Tokyo); City Museum of Contemporary Art (Hiroshima)
- 2010: "Tropicália. Die 60s in Brasilien." Kunsthalle Wien (Vienna, Austria)
  - Oiticica's Parangolé P4 Cape 1, 1968 adorns the poster of the exhibition, showing a very young Caetano Veloso
- 2010: IXXX Bienal Internacional de Arte de São Paulo (São Paulo)
- 2010: "Das Verlangen nach Form – O Desejo da Forma. Neoconcretismo und zeitgenössische Kunst aus Brasilien." Akademie der Künste (Berlin)
- 2010: "Vibración. Moderne Kunst aus Lateinamerika. The Ella Fontanals-Cisneros Collection." Bundeskunsthalle (Bonn)
- 2017–2018: "Making Art Concrete: Works from Argentina and Brazil in the Colección Patricia Phelps de Cisneros." Getty Center (Los Angeles, California) (August 29, 2017 – February 11, 2018)

=== Solo exhibitions ===
- 1966: "Hélio Oiticica." Galeria G4 (Rio de Janeiro)
- 1969: "Hélio Oiticica." Whitechapel Gallery (London)
- 1989: "Grupo Frente e Metaesquemas." Galeria São Paulo (São Paulo)
- 1989: "Mundo-abrigo." 110 Arte Contemporânea (Rio de Janeiro) [catalogue]
- 1992–97: "Hélio Oiticica." Witte de With Center for Contemporary Art (Rotterdam); Galerie nationale du Jeu de Paume (Paris); Fundació Antoni Tàpies (Barcelona); Centro de Arte Moderna da Fundação Calouste Gulbenkian (Lisbon); Walker Art Center (Minneapolis, Minnesota); Centro de Arte Hélio Oiticica (Rio de Janeiro)
- 1994: "Hélio Oiticica, Lygia Clark." Museu de Arte Moderna do Rio de Janeiro (Rio de Janeiro; Museu de Arte Moderna da Bahia (Salvador da Bahia [catalogue]
- 1996: "Grupo frente 1955–1956. Metasquemas 1957–1958." Joel Edelstein Arte Contemporânea (Rio de Janeiro) [catalogue]
- 1999: "L. Clark, H. Oiticica, L. Pape." Conjunto Cultural da Caixa Econômica Federal (Brasília) [catalogue]
- 2000: "Espaço de Instalações Permanentes." Museu do Açude (Rio de Janeiro) [catalogue]
- 2001–2: "Hélio Oiticica. Quasi-Cinemas." Wexner Center for the Arts (Columbus, Ohio); Kölnischer Kunstverein (Cologne); Whitechapel Gallery (London); New Museum of Contemporary Art (New York) [catalogue]
- 2002: "Liam Gillick: The Wood Way. Helio Oiticica: Quasi-cinema." Whitechapel Gallery (London) [catalogue]
- 2002: "Hélio Oiticica. Obra e estratégia." Museu de Arte Moderna do Rio de Janeiro (Rio de Janeiro) [catalogue]
- 2003: "Hélio Oiticica. Cor, imagem, poética." Centro de Arte Hélio Oiticica (Rio de Janeiro) [catalogue]
- 2005: "Cosmococa. Programa in progress. Hélio Oiticica, Neville D’Almeida, Museo de Arte Latinoamericano de Buenos Aires." Fundación Costantini (Buenos Aires); Centro de Arte Contemporãnea Inhotim (Brumadinho) [catalogue]
- 2006: "Penetrável." Galeria Nara Roesler (São Paulo) [brochure]
- 2006–7: "Hélio Oiticica: The Body of Color." Museum of Fine Arts, Houston (Houston, Texas); Tate Modern (London) [catalogue]
- 2010: "Beyond Participation. Hélio Oiticica and Neville D’Almeida in New York." The Bertha and Karl Leubsdorf Art Gallery, Hunter College (New York) [catalogue]
- 2017: "Hélio Oiticica: To Organize Delirium." Art Institute of Chicago (Chicago); Carnegie Museum of Art (Pittsburgh), curated by Lynn Zelevansky; and Whitney Museum of American Art (New York)
- 2018: "Helio Oiticica: Spatial Relief and Drawings - 1955-59." Galerie LeLong & Co., New York City
- 2022-2023: "Hélio Oiticica: Penetrável Macaléia." Pérez Art Museum Miami, curated by Jennifer Inacio.

== Selected works ==
- Grupo Frente No. 73 at the Museum of Modern Art (1955-1956)
- Grupo Frente No. 136 at the Museum of Modern Art (1956)
- Metaesquema at the Museum of Modern Art (1956)
- Metaesquema No. 179 at the Museum of Modern Art (1956)
- Untitled (Grupo Frente) at the Museum of Modern Art (1957)
- Metaesquema No. 237 at the Museum of Modern Art (1957)
- Metaesquema 12 at Museum of Fine Arts, Houston (1957) Wikidata ()
- Metaesquema No. 348 at the Museum of Modern Art (1958)
- Metaesquema 362 at Carnegie Museum of Art (1958) Wikidata ()
- Metaesquema No. 4066 at the Museum of Modern Art (1958)
- Metaesquema at the Museum of Modern Art (1958)
- Vermelho cortando o branco at Museum of Fine Arts, Houston (1958) Wikidata ()
- Metaesquema at Tate Modern (1958)
- Metaesquema at Tate Modern (1958)
- Metaesquema at Tate Modern (1958)
- Red Monochrome at the Museum of Modern Art (1959)
- Painting 9 at the Museum of Modern Art (1959)
- Bilateral ‘Teman’ BIL 003 at Tate Modern (1959)
- Spatial Relief (red) REL 036 at Tate Modern (1959)
- Sem título (Untitled) at Museo Nacional Centro de Arte Reina Sofía (1959) Wikidata ()
- Neoconcrete Relief at the Museum of Modern Art (1960) Wikidata ()
- Relevo espacial at Museum of Fine Arts, Houston (c. 1960) Wikidata ()
- B11 Box Bólide 09 at Tate Modern (1964)
- Box Bolide 12, 'archeologic' at the Museum of Modern Art (1964-1965)
- B17 Glass Bólide 05 ‘Homage to Mondrian’ at Tate Modern (1965)
- P16 Parangolé cape 12 "From Adversity We Live" at the Museum of Modern Art (1965–1992)
- Seja marginal, seja herói (Be an Outlaw, Be a Hero) at Philadelphia Museum of Art (1967) Wikidata ()
- Homage to My Father (Projeto H.O.) at the Museum of Modern Art (1972)
- Homage to My Father (Projeto H.O.) at the Museum of Modern Art (1972)
- The afternoon almost evening at the Museum of Modern Art (1973)
- Penetrável Macaléia at the Pérez Art Museum Miami (1978)

== Works and publications ==
- Oiticica, Hélio; Brett, Guy (1969). Helio Oiticica (Exhibition catalog). London: Whitechapel Gallery. ISBN 978-0-854-88001-0. OCLC 25209. – catalogue of an exhibition held on 25 February-6 April 1969 at the Whitechapel Gallery
- Amaral, Aracy A.; Oiticica, Hélio (February 1973). "Hélio Oiticica". Colóquio (in Portuguese). S. 2, a. 15 (11): 55–60. OCLC 959182049.
- Gullar, Ferreira; Pedrosa, Mário; Oiticica, Hélio (1973). Arte brasileira hoje [situação e perspectivas] (in Portuguese). Rio de Janeiro: Paz e Terra. OCLC 610681196.
- Oiticica, Hélio (1974). Bloco, experiências in cosmococa: programa in progress: CC5, "Hendrix war", com Neville D'Almeida, New York, 1973 (Exhibition catalog) (in Portuguese and English). São Paulo: Galeria de Arte São Paulo. OCLC 42269185. – Pamphlet consists of stream of consciousness monologues which accompanied two slide show exhibitions discussing both the work of Neville D'Almeida and Jimi Hendrix
- Vergara, Carlos; Oiticica, Hélio (1978). Carlos Vergara (Exhibition catalog) (in Portuguese). Rio de Janeiro: Edição FUNARTE. OCLC 948424930.
- Oiticica, Hélio; Figueiredo, Luciano; Pape, Lygia; Salomão, Waly (1986). Aspiro ao grande labirinto (in Portuguese). Rio de Janeiro: Rocco. OCLC 16447855.
- Oiticica, Hélio; Brett, Guy; Figueiredo, Luciano; Valentin, Andreas (1992). Hélio Oiticica (Exhibition catalog) (in English and Dutch). Translated by Berg, Stephen. Photography by Bardin, Desdémone. Barcelona: Fundació Antoni Tàpies. ISBN 978-8-460-41862-7. OCLC 959094859. – Published in connection with an exhibition held from Feb. 22-Apr. 26, 1992 in Rotterdam, June 8-Aug. 23, 1992 in Paris, Oct. 1-Dec. 6, 1992 in Barcelona, Jan. 20-Mar. 20, 1993 in Lisbon, and Oct. 31, 1993-Feb. 20, 1994 in Minneapolis

== See also ==
- Anti-art
- Grupo Frente
