= Lynn Zelevansky =

American art historian and curator (born 1947)

- Born: New York City
- Education: Pratt Institute, New York University
- Known for: Curator, Museum Director

Lynn Zelevansky (born 1947) is an American art historian and curator. Formerly Henry Heinz II Director of the Carnegie Museum of Art, she is currently based in New York City. Zelevansky curated "Love Forever: Yayoi Kusama" (1998) and "Beyond Geometry: Experiments in Form" (2004) for Los Angeles County Museum of Art from 1995 to 2009. While working at MoMA (1987–1995), she curated “Sense and Sensibility: Women Artists and Minimalism in the Nineties” (1994), that institution's first all-female exhibition. AICA awarded it "Best Emerging Art Exhibition New York."

== Early life and education ==
Zelevansky was born and raised on the Upper West Side of Manhattan. Her father worked in the insurance and real estate business. She attended the Ethical Culture Fieldston School through high school, graduating in 1965. She met her future husband Paul Zelevansky during her first week at Carnegie Institute of Technology. They married in 1968, but she transferred to Pratt Institute, where she graduated with a BFA in Photography in 1971. Following graduation, she worked as a photographer and free-lance critic, reviewing photography and art exhibitions for various publications. During this period, she also taught photography and criticism at Pratt, Cooper Union, and the New School. In 1984, with two children (born in 1974 and 1977) at home, she began the graduate program at NYU's Institute of Fine Arts, earning her MA in 1987, and later completing coursework towards her doctorate. During her studies, Zelevansky co-curated exhibitions for Pratt Institute and Camerawork.

== Curatorial career ==
In 1986, Zelevansky joined MoMA's Department of Painting and Sculpture as a curatorial assistant and remained there until 1995. While at MoMA, she assisted William Rubins on "Picasso and Braque: Pioneering Cubism," for which she edited the second volume of the catalog, and on the Ad Reinhardt exhibition and assisted on exhibitions of the work of Vito Acconci, and Robert Ryman. In addition to curating “Sense and Sensibility," she organized Projects exhibitions for: Houston Conwill, Cildo Meireles, Guillermo Kuitca, Suzanne Lafont, and Gabriel Orozco.

Zelevansky was awarded a 1995 Peter Norton Family Foundation Curator's Grant. In 1997, Zelevansky was the keynote speaker at Teachers College "Women in Arts and Culture"

In 1995 Zelevansky became Assistant Curator in the department of Modern and Contemporary Art at Los Angeles County Museum of Art, eventually becoming the Terri and Michael Smooke Curator and Department Head, Contemporary Art While at LACMA, she and Laura Hoptman co-curated the first US museum survey of Japanese artist Yayoi Kusama. She also organized a retrospective for Robert Therrien, and Diego Rivera. During this period, she originated several group exhibitions such as "Longing and Memory" (1997), "Beyond Geometry: Experiments in Form" (2004), and "Your Bright Future: 12 Contemporary Artists from Korea" (2009). Michael Kimmelman called "Beyond Geometry" a "creative rethinking of the history of postwar vanguard art in the West" and AICA awarded it "Best Thematic Exhibition Nationally." On the occasion of "Beyond Geometry," the J. Paul Getty Museum hosted the symposium "Structures and Systems: An Intercontinental Art World."

In 2009, Zelevansky became Henry J. Heinz II Director of the Carnegie Museum of Art.During her tenure at CMOA, she collaborated with Elisabeth Sussman on "Paul Thek: Diver" and together with Sussman and James Rondeau on "Hélio Oiticica: To Organize Delirium". Zelevansky oversaw the 2013 presentation of the Carnegie International, which highlighted the intersections of contemporary international art and activism and demonstrated the ways the Carnegie International (since 1896) had influenced its collection. After leaving the Carnegie, Zelevansky returned to her native New York City to work as an independent art historian, writer, and curator. She recently curated Leon Polk Smith: Prairie Moon for Lisson Gallery in New York and Art is Art and Everything Else is Everything Else at the Fundacion Juan March in Madrid.

== Publications ==
- Hélio Oiticica: To Organize Delirium. Whitney Museum of American Art. 2016. ISBN 9783791355221
- Paul Thek: The Diver. Whitney Museum of American Art. Carnegie Museum of Art. 2011. ISBN 9780300165951
- Your Bright Future: 12 Contemporary Artists from Korea. Museum of Fine Arts, Houston. June 23, 2009. ISBN 0300146892
- Cildo Mereiles. Tate Modern/DAP. February 1, 2009. ISBN 9781933045917
- PBCAM/LACMA/2008: The Broad Contemporary Art Museum at the Los Angeles County Museum of Art. Los Angeles County Museum of Art. April 1, 2008. ISBN 0875871976
- François Morellet. Annely Juda Fine Art. 2008. ISBN 1904621228
- ''François Morellet. Musée des Beaux Arts, Angers. 2006. ISBN 2901287999
- Beyond Geometry: Experiments in Form, 1940s–1970s. Los Angeles County Museum of Art. June 1, 2004. ISBN 0262240475
- Keith Edmier and Farrah Fawcett: Recasting Pygmalion. Rizzoli. December 13, 2002. ISBN 0847824403
- Robert Therrien. Los Angeles County Museum of Art. February 1, 2000. ISBN 0875871860
- Love Forever: Yayoi Kusama, 1958–1968. Los Angeles County Museum of Art. April 2, 1998. ISBN 087587181X
- Sense and Sensibility: Women Artists and Minimalism in the Nineties. Museum of Modern Art. April 10, 1995. ISBN 0870701207
- Robert Ryman. Tate Gallery. London. 1993. ISBN 1854371142
- Picasso and Braque: A Symposium. Harry N Abrams Inc. October 1, 1992. ISBN 0810961172
- Guillermo Kuitca. Newport Harbor Art Museum. 1992.
- Products and Promotion: Art, Advertising and the American Dream. SF Camerawork. 1986.
- Art is Art and Everything Else is Everything Else. Fundacion Juan March. March 15, 2022. ISBN 9788470756689
