= Neo-Concrete Movement =

Art movement in Brazil

The Neo-Concrete Movement (1959–1961) was a Brazilian art movement, a group that splintered off from the larger Concrete Art movement prevalent in Latin America and in other parts of the world. The Neo-Concretes emerged from Rio de Janeiro’s Grupo Frente. They rejected the pure rationalist approach of concrete art and embraced more phenomenological art. The Neo-Concrete movement called for greater sensuality, color, and poetic feeling in concrete art, distinguishing itself from the more rigid approach of the original Concrete Art movement. Ferreira Gullar inspired Neo-Concrete philosophy through his essay “Theory of the Non-Object” (1959) and wrote the “Neo-Concrete Manifesto” (1959) which outlines what Neo-Concrete art should be. Lygia Clark, Hélio Oiticica, and Lygia Pape were among the primary leaders of this movement.

== Background ==
After World War I, Europe witnessed a boom of art movements based upon rationalism such as De Stijl and Bauhaus. Artists believed humanity would be able to achieve progress through its ability to reason. In Latin America, ideas of rationalist and non-objective art took root in the early 1950s in reaction to the muralism controversy. Governments such as the Mexican government utilized muralism to create propaganda. Under repressive Latin American governments, artists rebelled against the idea of aiding the political regime through figurative art; therefore geometric abstraction and concretism ushered in an art that did not connote anything political or have really any meaning at all.

Concrete Art was able to flourish beneath these repressive regimes because it held no political messages or incendiary material. In Brazil, ideas of rationalist art and geometric abstraction arose in the early 1950s following the establishment of a democratic republic in 1946. The period from 1946 to 1964 is known as the Second Brazilian Republic. Groups such as Grupo Ruptura in São Paulo and Grupo Frente in Rio de Janeiro rose. Specifically Ruptura followed the ideal of pure mathematical art which does not connote meaning outside of what it is.

The Neo-Concrete art movement arose when Grupo Frente realized that Concretism was “naïve and somewhat colonialist” and an “overly rational conception of abstract structure.”

In 1960, Hélio Oiticica joined the Neo-Concrete group, and his series of red and yellow painted hanging wood constructions was considered groundbreaking, bringing a new dimension to the use of color in three-dimensional space. In 1961 as the political tides began to turn, the Neo-Concrete artists disbanded no longer content to limit themselves to this one philosophy. Lygia Clark and Hélio Oiticica, leaders of the Neo-Concrete movement, put their energy into Conceptual Art. Art historians often refer to Neo-Concretism as the precursor to Conceptual Art because of the foundation of “abstruse metaphysics.” On April 1, 1964, a military coup removed Joao Goulart and established a military government in Brazil until 1985. The increase of violence called for a new kind of art that had the potential to carry meaning and deconstruct traditional thought even further. This came in the form of Conceptual Art.

== The Neo-Concrete Manifesto and pushback against Concretism ==
Brazilian poet and writer Ferreira Gullar wrote the Neo-Concrete Manifesto in 1959 and described a work of art as “something which amounts to more than the sum of its constituent elements; something which analysis may break down into various elements but which can only be understood phenomenologically.” In contrast to the Concrete Art movement, Gullar was calling for an art that was not based upon rationalism or in pursuit of pure form. He sought works of art that became active once the viewer was involved. Neo-concrete art must disassemble the limitations of the object and “express complex human realities.”

While Concretism built its art upon the basis of logic and objective knowledge with color, space, and form conveying universalism and objectivity, the Neo-Concrete artists saw color, space, and form as “not [belonging] to this or that artistic language, but to the living and indeterminate experience of man.” Though Neo-Concrete Art still maintained Concretism as the foundation for their ideas, Neo-Concretists believed objectivity and mathematical principles alone could not accomplish the Concretist goal of creating a transcendental visual language.

Neo-Concretists believed that artworks were not simply static representations or forms; rather “art should be like living organisms” In Lygia Clark’s theoretical statement written to address the intentions of the Neo-Concrete artists, she explains that as artists they wish to “found a new, expressive ‘space’.” This movement believed that through a direct relationship between the artwork and the viewer this “new, expressive ‘space’” could be constructed. Neo-Concrete artists sought to create a multi-sensorial space which caused the spectator to feel more acutely their own body and existence.

Clark also wrote of how Neo-Concretism sought to decipher the nature of humanity by creating a “medium of expression” which allowed people to “become aware of unity as an organic, living whole.” It was not just restoring an awareness of the spectator’s body but also of humanity’s communal existence.

The first Neo-Concrete Exhibition was held in Rio de Janeiro in March 1959, and the exhibiting artists were Amilcar de Castro, Ferreira Gullar, Franz Weissmann, Lygia Clark, Lygia Pape, Reynaldo Jardim, and Theon Spanudis.

== Neo-Concrete Manifesto ==
This manifesto was written by Ferreira Gullar, and was signed by Amilcar de Castro, Ferreira Gullar, Franz Weissmann, Lygia Clark, Lygia Pape, Reynaldo Jardim and Theon Spanudis. It was published on 22 of March 1959 in Journal do Brazil.

We use the term “neo-concrete” to differentiate ourselves from those committed to non-figurative “geometric” art (neo-plasticism, constructivism, suprematism, Ulm School) and in particular the kind of concrete art that is influenced by a dangerously extreme rationalism. Compelled by their experiences, the painters, sculptors, engravers, and writers participating in this First Neo-concrete Exhibition came to the conclusion that it was necessary to revise the theoretical principles on which concrete art has been founded, none of which offers a rationale for the expressive potential they feel their art contains.

Born with cubism, as a reaction against the impressionist disintegration of poetic language, it was natural that so-called geometric art should situate itself in a position diametrically opposed to the technical and allusive resources of ordinary painting. The new achievements of physics and mechanics, in opening up a wide perspective for objective thought, encouraged, among those who continued this revolution, the tendency towards an everincreasing rationalization of the processes and purposes of painting. A mechanicalist notion of construction invaded the language of painters and sculptors, generating, in turn, equally extreme responses of a reactionary nature, such as magical or irrationalist realism, Dada, or surrealism. Therefore, there is no doubt that the true artists—as is the case with, for example, Mondrian or Pevsner—constructed their works following those theories that consecrated scientific objectivity and mechanical precision, but in that hand-to-hand combat with expression they overcame the limits imposed by theory. Yet the work of those artists has been interpreted to this day from theoretical positions that that same work denied. We propose a reinterpretation of neo-plasticism, constructivism, and other similar movements, basing ourselves on their expressive successes and making the work of art take precedence over theory. If we were to attempt to understand Mondrian’s painting starting from his theories, we would be forced to choose one over the other. We either find the prophecy of the complete integration of art in daily life to be possible (and we see in Mondrian’s work the first steps in that direction), or we view that integration as ever more remote, in which case his work seems to have failed. Either the vertical and the horizontal are truly the fundamental rhythms of the universe, and Mondrian’s oeuvre is the application of that universal principle, or the principle fails, and his work turns out to be based on an illusion. But the truth is that Mondrian’s work is there, alive and fertile, above these theoretical contradictions. It is useless to view Mondrian as the destroyer of the surface, of the plane and the line, if we do not perceive the new space that that destruction constructed.

The same can be said of Vantongerloo or Pevsner. It does not matter what mathematical equations are at the root of a sculpture or a painting by Vantongerloo, because only in the experience of its direct perception does the work provide the “meaning” of its rhythms and colors. Whether Pevsner started from figures of descriptive geometry or not is irrelevant, when one confronts the new space that his sculptures generate and the cosmic-organic expression that, through it, its forms reveal. Determining the ways in which artistic objects and scientific instruments, or the artist’s intuition and the physicist’s and engineer’s objective thought, converged may be interesting from a cultural standpoint, but from an aesthetic standpoint, the work of art provokes interest precisely because of what it possesses that transcends these external circumstances—because of the universe of existential meanings that merge and are revealed in the work of art.

Malevich, having recognized the superiority of “pure perception in art,” placed his theoretical definitions in a position that was safe from the limitations of rationalism and mechanicalism, projecting a transcendent dimension in his paintings that guarantees him a notable relevance today. But Malevich’s daring cost him dearly, in simultaneously opposing both figurative art and mechanicalist abstraction, for to this day certain rationalist theoreticians consider him a naïf who did not understand the true sense of the new plastic arts … In fact, Malevich already expressed, within “geometric” painting, his dissatisfaction, his desire to transcend the rational and the sensorial, which today is undeniably manifest.

Neo-concretism, emerging out of the need to express the complex reality of modern man with the structural language of the new plastic arts, denies the validity of the attitudes espoused by scientificism and positivism in art and reconsiders the problem of expression, incorporating the new “verbal” dimensions created by constructive, non-figurative art. Rationalism divests art of all autonomy and substitutes the untransferable qualities of the work of art with notions of scientific objectivity. Thus, the concepts of form, space, time, and structure—which in the arts are linked to an existential meaning, emotive and affective—are confused with their theoretical application by science. In fact, in the name of preconceived ideas that today’s philosophy denounces (M. Merleau-Ponty, E. Cassirer, S. Langer)—and that are collapsing in every field, starting with modern biology, which has overcome Pavlovian mechanicalism—the concretist-rationalists still view man as a machine among machines and attempt to limit art to the expression of that theoretical reality.

We do not conceive of art either as a “machine” or as an “object” but as a quasi-corpus, that is, an entity whose reality is not exhausted in the external relationships of its elements; an entity that, though analytically divisible into its parts, only gives itself up fully to a direct, phenomenological approach. We believe that the work of art overcomes the material mechanism upon which it rests, not due to some virtue lying outside this Earth: it overcomes it by transcending those mechanical relationships (which is the object of Gestalt theory) and by creating for itself a tacit signification (Merleau-Ponty) that emerges in it for the first time. If we had to search for a simile for the work of art, we could not find it, therefore, either in a machine or in objects taken objectively, but rather, as S. Langer and V. Wleidlé [sic] argue, in living organisms. Furthermore, this comparison would not be sufficient to express the specific reality of the aesthetic organism.

Since the work of art is not limited to occupying a place in objective space—but rather transcends it in basing a new signification in it—the objective notions of time, space, form, structure, color, etc. are not sufficient to understand the work of art, to fully explain its “reality.” The lack of an adequate terminology for expressing a world that does not succumb to notions led art critics indiscriminately to employ words that are unfaithful to the complexity of the created work. The influence of technology and science was manifest here as well, to the degree that today, with their roles reversed, certain artists, confused by that terminology, attempt to make art starting from these objective notions in order to apply them as a creative method. Inevitably, the artists who work in this fashion only reveal a priori notions, since they are constrained by a method that already prescribes the results of their work before they begin. By avoiding intuitive creation, by reducing himself to an objective body in an objective space, with his paintings the rationalist concrete artist hardly demands, from himself and from the viewer, a stimulating and reflexive reaction. He speaks to the eye as an instrument and not to the eye as a human means of possessing the world and of giving oneself to it; he speaks to the machine-eye and not the body-eye.

Given that the work of art transcends mechanical space, the notions of cause and effect lose all validity in it, and the notions of time, space, form, and color are integrated in such a way—since they lacked any existence, as those notions, prior to the work—that it would be impossible to speak of them as elements that can be broken down. Neo-concrete art, affirming the absolute integration of these elements, vouches for the ability of its “geometric” vocabulary to assume the expression of complex human realities, manifest in many works by Mondrian, Malevich, Pevsner, Gabo, Sofia Taeuber-Arp, etc. If even these artists at times confused the concept of mechanical form with expressive form, it is important to clarify that, in the language of art, these so-called geometric forms lose the objective character of geometry in order to become vehicles for the imagination. Gestalt theory, in that it is still a psychology based on the concept of causation, also proves insufficient in helping us understand that phenomenon that dissolves the causally definable realities of space and form and presents them as time, as the spatialization of the work. By “spatialization of the work” is meant the fact that it is continually making itself present, it is always regaining the impulse that generated it and of which it was, in turn, the origin. And if this description remits us likewise to the first—full—experience of the real, that is because neo-concrete art seeks nothing more than to revive that experience. Neo-concrete art creates a new expressive space.

This position is equally valid for neo-concrete poetry, which condemns in concrete poetry the same mechanicalist objectivism of painting. The rationalist concrete poets also established the imitation of the machine as an ideal for their art. For them, too, space and time are but external relationships between object-words. Now, if that is the case, the page is reduced to a graphic space and the word to an element of that space. As in painting, the visual here is reduced to the optical, and the poem does not transcend the graphic dimension. Neo-concrete poetry rejects such spurious notions and, faithful to the very nature of language, reaffirms the poem as a temporal entity. In time and space, the word unfolds its complex signifying nature. The page in neo-concrete poetry is the spatialization of verbal time: it is pause, silence, time. It is evidently not a matter of returning to the concept of time that characterizes discursive poetry; for while language flows in succession in discursive poetry, in concrete poetry language opens up in duration. Therefore, unlike rationalist concretism, which views the word as object and transforms it into a mere optical signal, neo-concrete poetry restores it to its condition as “verbum,” that is, to the human mode of presentation of the real. In neo-concrete poetry, language does not slip away, but rather remains.

In its turn, neo-concrete prose, opening up a new field for expressive experiments, recovers language as flux, overcoming its syntactical contingencies and giving new, fuller meaning to certain solutions that until now were erroneously accepted as poetry. This is how, in painting as in poetry, in prose as in sculpture and printmaking, neo-concrete art reaffirms the independence of artistic creation in the face of objective knowledge (science) and practical knowledge (ethics, politics, industry, etc.).

The participants in this First Neo-concrete Exhibition do not constitute a “group.” They are not united by dogmatic principles. The evident affinity of their explorations in various fields has brought them together and led them to meet here. The commitment that obliges them commits each one of them, first and foremost, to their individual experience; they will remain together as long as the deep affinity that brought them together endures.

— Amilcar de Castro – Ferreira Gullar – Franz Weissmann – Lygia Clark – Lygia Pape – Reynaldo Jardim – Theon Spanudis. Rio de Janeiro, March 1959

== Selected artworks ==
- Hélio Oiticica, Inventions, 1959, 30 x 30 cm wooden plaques. Oiticica sought to use the element of color in order to “escape the constraints of painting while remaining in dialogue with it,” and wanted his Inventions to embody rather than simply illustrate light.
- Lygia Clark, Cocoons, 1959, metal. Clark cut one piece of metal and folded it irregularly in order to open “up the pictorial support toward the viewer.” This work made the viewer deal with the tension between form and space.
  - Cocoon no. 2 at the Museum of Modern Art (1959)
- Lygia Pape, Book of Creation, 1959, 30 x 30 cm pages assembled. This book served as a creation narrative that played off of the subjectivity and interpretation of the viewer.

== Neo-Concrete art exhibitions ==
- 1959: Bienal, São Paulo
- 1959: Exposição Neoconcreta, Bahia
- 1960: II Exposição Neoconcreta, Rio de Janeiro
- 1960: Venice Biennale, Venice
- 1960: Konkrete Kunst, Zürich
- 1961: Bienal, São Paulo
- 1961: Exposição Neoconcreta, São Paulo
