= Grupo Frente =

Defunct group of Brazilian artists

- Formation: 1952
- Founder: Ivan Serpa
- Founded at: Rio de Janeiro, Brazil
- Dissolved: 1964
- Purpose: Art and culture
- Members: 5
- Leader: Ivan Serpa
- Key people: Helio Oiticica; Aluisio Carvão; Lygia Clark; Lygia Pape

Grupo Frente was a group of Brazilian artists originated in Rio de Janeiro which existed from 1952-1964. The group was led by Ivan Serpa, and was formed by artists such as Helio Oiticica, Aluisio Carvão, Lygia Clark, and Lygia Pape. Many of them studied under Ivan Serpa. Each of them came from different styles of art, but they all embraced the ideals of Concrete art, or what is now called geometric abstraction.

== History ==
Grupo Frente was a small collective group of geometric abstract artists. The group has been called a loose group of official collective concrete artists, which has been interpreted as a group that allowed people to enter and leave. The movement of Concrete art pushed them towards Neo- Concrete art. Each member brought a different aspect to the group as a whole. They got together in museums as the MAM Museu de Arte Moderna. They were under the leadership of Ivan Serpa. Ivan started the group in 1952. The group pushed for Neo Concrete art, which was described in the overview. Grupo Frente dispersed in 1956.

== Artists ==
=== Ivan Serpa ===
Ivan Serpa did many different types of art in his time, such as abstraction, expressionism, and figurative art. He helped shape the Concrete and Neo-Concrete art. He was seen as the leader of Grupo Frente. Many people worked under him to receive some of his art knowledge.

=== Lygia Clark ===
During her Concrete Art phase, when the Grupo Frente was operative, Lygia Clark made paintings that were very geometric in nature, but had a strong sense of dynamism due to her use of diagonal lines. Unlike others in the group, her works created the illusion of three-dimensionality. When she broke off to found the Neo-Concrete Movement, she moved onto working with metals and making pieces out of them that involved the spectator. After that, Clark focused more on sensory art and the mind body dualities, which means the spectator interacts with the art.

=== Lygia Pape ===
The majority of Lygia Pape's work was focused on the spectator and not the artwork itself. Pape made wood cut outs that focused on the spectator's perception. During the Grupo Frente time, Pape focused on lines and shapes and the way they work with one another.

=== Helio Oiticica ===
While participating with Grupo Frente, Helio Oiticia made monochromatic paintings. Oiticia joined to work under the leadership of Ivan Serpa. While Oiticia was part of Grupo Frente, his artwork focused on shapes, colors, and lines. Along with Clark, Oiticica then moved to Neo-Concrete.

== Analysis of Artworks ==
Sem Titulo by Helio Oiticia in 1955 This artwork was done by Helio Oiticia, one of the five members, a drawing on an oil board, which is 16 x 16 x 16 5/8. This is an untitled piece. This reflects the main ideas of the Grupo Frente—a lack of representation of objects or figures, but an emphasis on colors, shapes, and lines. This is shown through the colors and the structure of the drawing.

Untitled by Hélio Oiticica in 1956 This artwork is gouache on cardboard and is 409mm x 409mm. This artwork is relevant to Grupo Frente because it reflects the different colors, lines, and shapes. There are both horizontal and vertical lines, as well as, multiple rectangles and squares. Many of their artworks portray these shapes. In this artwork there are nine different colors. This artwork shows no representation of anything.

== Exhibitions ==
Grupo Frente organized two solo exhibitions. One of them was at the MAM, which is The Museum of Modern Art.

== Sources ==
- Lucie-Smith, Edward. Latin America Art of the 20th Century. Second Ed. New York: Thames and Hudson, 2004. Print.
- Rasmussen, Waldo. Latin American Artists of the Twentieth Century. New York: The Museum of Modern Art, 1993. Print.
- Ramirez. Inverted Utopias: Avant-Garde Art in Latin America New Haven and London: Yale University Press, 2004. Print.
- Venancio Filho, Paulo. Time and Place: Rio de Janeiro 1952-1964. London: Thames and Hudson, 2008. Print.
