= Lygia Pape =

Brazilian artist (1927–2004)

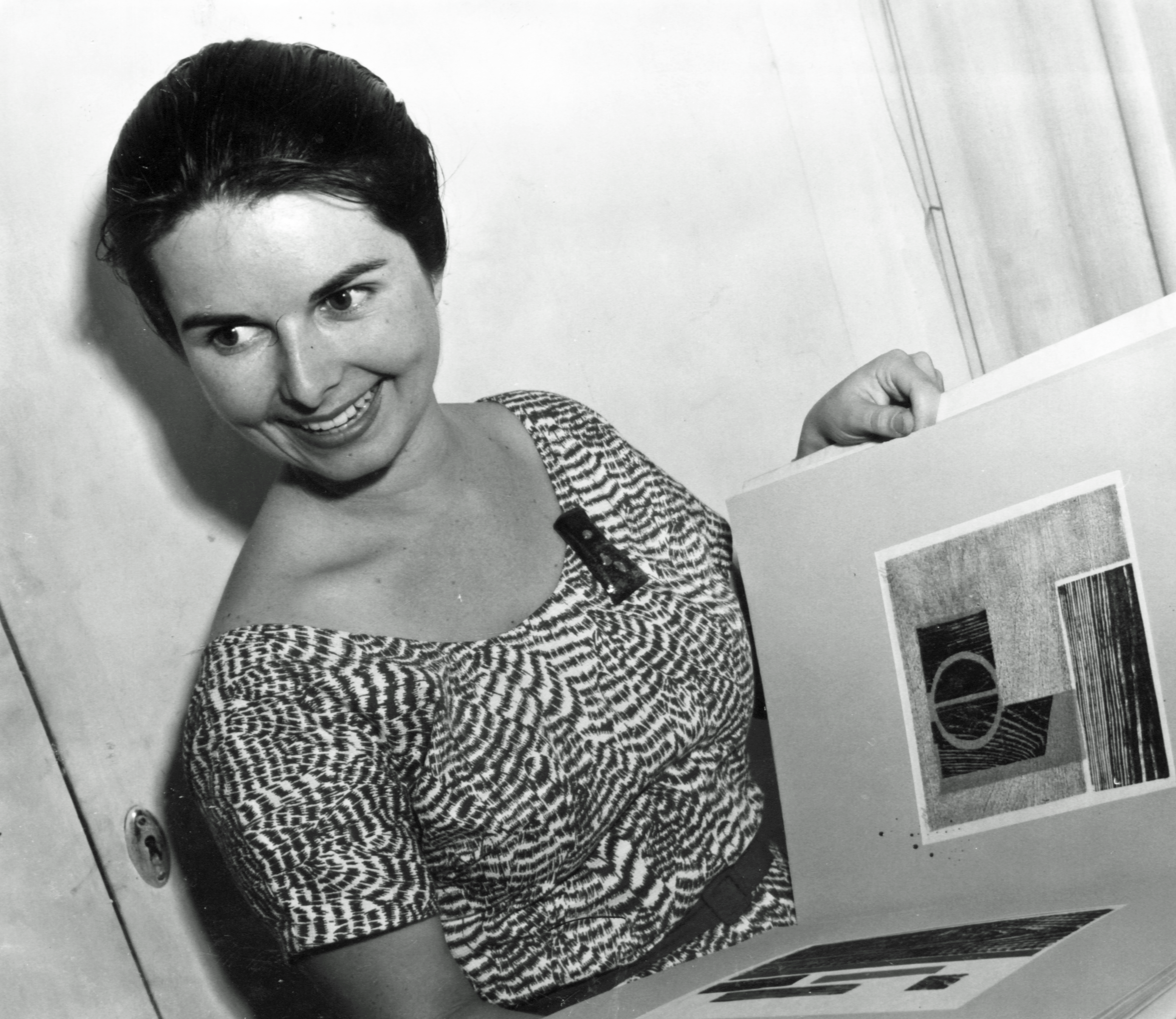
- Lygia Pape, Arquivo Nacional Collection
- Born: 7 April 1927; Nova Friburgo, Brazil
- Died: 3 May 2004 (aged 77); Rio de Janeiro, Brazil
- Known for: Sculpture, engraving, film
- Notable work: Tecelares [Weavings] (1959), Livro da Criacao [Book of Creation] (1959), Ttéias [Web] (1979)
- Movement: Concrete art and Neo-Concrete Movement
- Website: web.archive.org/web/20160827185105/http://www.lygiapape.org.br/

Lygia Pape (7 April 1927 – 3 May 2004) was a Brazilian visual artist, sculptor, engraver, and filmmaker, who was a key figure in the Concrete movement and a later co-founder of the Neo-Concrete Movement in Brazil during the 1950s and 1960s. Along with Hélio Oiticica and Lygia Clark, she was an important artist in the expansion of contemporary art in Brazil and pushed geometric art to include aspects of interaction and to engage with ethical and political themes.

== Early life and career ==
Lygia Pape was born on 7 April 1927 in Nova Friburgo, Brazil. Pape studied philosophy at the Universidade Federal do Rio de Janeiro (UFTJ). Afterwards, she received an informal training in fine arts, and studied with Fayga Ostrower at the Museum of Modern Art, Rio de Janeiro.

== Concrete art ==
At age 20, Pape joined the concrete art movement. The term "concrete art" was coined by the Dutch artist Theo van Doesburg in 1930.

=== Tecelares Series ===
In the 1950s, Pape created her Tecelares Series. The Tecelares wood prints were originally seen purely as works of Concrete art because of their precise and geometric aesthetic. The woodblock prints are minimalistic; they feature planes of black ink and thin lines that reveal the white rice paper underneath. The production of the series seems straightforward: Pape incised the entire surface of the woodblock with thin lines, adding several non-orthogonal lines to create the appearance of distinct planes and the suggestion of movement and space in a work that would be otherwise flat and static. In Tecelares, Lygia Pape used "weaving" as a metaphor to evoke handiwork and a connection to Brazil's traditional and indigenous culture. Pape spoke of how indigenous Brazilian cultures had used geometry to express fundamental concepts, like the concept of collective identity. Thus, for Lygia Pape, geometry did not represent industry or mechanization, but rather it expressed a transcendent idiom. Instead of using a gridded and rigid composition, Pape blended natural and organic patterns with incised lines that are intertwined to "warp and weft." Pape used simple materials, crafted minimally by her own hands, to incorporate expression into a work that is not expressionistic.

==== Sem Titulo [Untitled] (1959) ====
This 1959 artwork in the Tecelares series, takes the same woodblock carving technique and is incised by thin parallel lines which are disrupted by the non-orthogonal lines that cut across the print. The two horizontally oriented lines that cut across the print break up the continuity of the parallel lines, creating the illusion of a separate plain and thus, space.

Although Pape used a ruled edge and a compass to create the lines in Sem Título [Untitled] (1959), there are slight variations in the width of the lines, revealing that a hand rather than a machine made the forms. Additionally, the rice paper's delicacy had absorbed the ink, creating imprecise edges. The black ink of the woodprint's background also reveals the natural wood grain of the block print as one can see the porous marks of the wood between the incised lines on the print. So despite the woodprint's originally Concrete identity, Sem Título [Untitled] (1959), is now understood as a transitional piece from the Concrete movement into the Neo-Concrete, as it is infused with non-mechanical and "handmade" qualities that seem more expressive than mechanistic.

- Untitled at the Museum of Modern Art, 1959
- Untitled at the Museum of Modern Art, 1959

==== Sem Titulo [Untitled] (1960) ====
The 1960s version of Tecelares is even more organic and expressive than the earlier 1959 version. The print shows the grain of the woodblock even more overtly in the bottom portion of the print, while the top portion remains relatively muted. As in the other prints in this series, Sem Título [Untitled] (1960) is cut by diagonal lines that disrupt the continuity of the horizontal wood grain pattern, creating movement and distinct planes in the artwork, though they are considerably more subtle than the 1959 Sem Título [Untitled] print of the same series. Also similar to the 1959 print, the 1960 print has the same imprecise quality created by the feathering of the ink on the rice paper. It also has a very organic quality, which is produced through the patterns and swirls of the wood grain. Because of this organic pattern, this print seems to overtly oppose the mechanic properties associated with Concrete art.

- Untitled from the series Weavings (Tecelares) at the Museum of Modern Art, 1960

== Grupo Frente ==
In 1952, at the age of 25, Pape met fellow Brazilian artists Hélio Oiticica, Ivan Serpa, and Aluísio Carvão. Together the quartet formed the Grupo Frente. The Grupo Frente organized a subtle movement that rejected the national painting style of Brazil. Grupo Frente began exploring abstract and concrete art styles that distanced themselves from overly political art. The group was united by their desire to reject modern Brazilian art. Grupo Frente was revolutionary for their studies in line, form, and color. Grupo Frente organized two solo exhibitions. Their first exhibition was at the Ibeu gallery in Rio in 1954, under the artist guidance of Ferreira Gullar. Their second exhibition was in 1955 at the Museum of Modern Art in Rio. Both exhibits highlighted non-traditional use of line, geometric shapes and color.

== Neo-Concrete Movement ==
After her involvement with the Grupo Frente Concrete artists, Pape transitioned into the short wave of Neo-Concrete art.

As scholar Adele Nelson suggested, the Grupo Ruptura artist Waldemar Cordeiro and the Grupo Frente Ferreira Gullar had a debate on each other's “inadequate and overzealous rigor in their respective approaches to geometric abstraction”, which promoted and inspired the former members of Grupo Frente including Lygia Pape to initiate the Neo-Concrete movement in 1959. Neo-Concrete Movement advocates for a more expressive and corporeal viewing experience than the “overly rational” art-making approach embraced by Grupo Ruptura.

In 1959 Pape was a signatory of the Neo-Concrete Manifesto, along with Lygia Clark and Helio Oiticica. In explaining her approach, Lygia Pape said:

My concern is always invention. I always want to invent a new language that's different for me and for others, too... I want to discover new things. Because, to me, art is a way of knowing the world... to see how the world is... of getting to know the world.

Pape specifically during her Neo-Concrete period was interested in the “proposal to ‘live the body.’” This phrase indicates Pape’s interest in how the physical body acts as our mediator for all sensual experiences. Pape sought to explore this idea of the body’s relation in space by creating multi-sensorial experiences in her artwork.

=== Livro da Criação [Book of Creation], (1959) ===
The sculpture/book/poem Livro da Criação [Book of Creation] is emblematic of the early Neo-Concrete works. The work consists of sixteen unbound cardboard "pages". The pages are 12 x 12 inches each and feature abstract images that are supposed to signify a significant moment in the creation of the world, such as the recession of water, the discovery of fire and agriculture, hunting, and navigation. As a Neo-concrete artist, Lygia Pape's Livro da Criação [Book of Creation] synthesizes reason and emotion. The participant is meant to have a phenomenological experience by handling the book. Each reading of the work might be different based on the individual's experiences. As Lygia Pape noted, "It's important to say that there are two plausible readings: for me it is the book of the creation of the world, but for others it can be the book of "creation." Through each person's experiences, there is a process of open structure through which each structure can generate its own reading."

== Later career ==
Later on in the 1960s and 1970s, Pape produced more videos and installations using sarcastic and critical metaphors against the Brazilian dictatorship. From the 1980s onward, these metaphors became more subtle.

Among the videos produced in this period, the seminal film made in 1975 by Pape, Eat Me, has evoked the interest in exploring the attraction and repulsion in gender and sexuality. The sensual movements of a female and a male mouth are presented in slow motion, which is referred to as an implication of a vagina as well as the actions of “sucking and expelling objects”, according to Claudia Calirman. Although Pape persisted that this work should not be viewed as a thesis, the film reveals sexism by “implicating the viewer in the objectification of women”.

Her artwork worked as a vehicle for existential, sensorial, and psychological life experiences, much of it based in geometry and relying on both the intellectual and physical participation of the viewer. A 1967 work, O Ovo, had installation participants crawl inside a cube-shaped structure of wooden boards covered in plastic film, and then push through the film to simulate the act of being born.

From 1972 to 1985, Pape taught semiotics at the School of Architecture at the Universidade Santa Úrsula in Rio de Janeiro, and was appointed professor in the School of Fine Arts of the Universidade Federal do Rio de Janeiro in 1983 as well. In 1980 she received a master's degree in philosophy from the Federal University of Rio de Janeiro. In her teaching, Pape introduced her mostly middle and upper class students to the informal architecture of Rio de Janeiro's favelas, with particular focus on Maré. In her films, photography, and teaching of the 1970s and 1980s, Pape sought to investigate architectural forms and sociability of urban space in Rio de Janeiro.

In 1981 Pape received a Guggenheim Fellowship.

Pape's first retrospective exhibition was held in 2000, with a close focus on her print practice in chronological delineation. She viewed these works as “a generative source of her fifty-plus years of artistic creation”. When reinterpreting these artworks, Pape also adopted the form of photography with no surprise.

=== The Ttéias series ===
Of all of Pape's works, Ttéias (1979) is perhaps most emblematic of her artistic process. The Ttéias was first conceived in 1979, but it was not until the 1990s that it was produced in full scale. In 1978 Lygia Pape began to experiment arranging and rearranging metallic strings together with her students at the Parque Lage Gardens in Rio de Janeiro. Pape invented the word "Ttéias", which is a pun based on the Portuguese word for "web" ("teia") and for "a person or thing of grace" ("teteia"). This series consists of an immersive staging of semi-transparent prisms, which were created using gold thread. This piece blends realism and imaginary art, allowing the viewer to interpret Ttéias by walking through it.

== Death and legacy ==
Pape died on 3 May 2004 in Rio de Janeiro at age of 77.

Her work is in the collections of the Museum of Modern Art, the Museo Nacional Centro de Arte Reina Sofía, and the Tate,

Pape's work was included in the 2021 exhibition Women in Abstraction at the Centre Pompidou.

In 2025/2026 Pape was given her first solo exhibition in France, called Weaving Space, at the Pinault Collection, Bourse de Commerce.

== Select exhibitions ==
- 2000 Artur Barrio, Antonio Manuel, Lygia Pape, Museu Serralves, Porto
- 2002 Brazil: Body and Soul, Solomon R. Guggenheim Museum, New York
- 2003 50. Biennale di Venezia
- 2009 Making Worlds, 53rd Biennale di Venezia, Venice
- 2009 Folder Museum of Modern Art, New York
- 2011 Lygia Pape: Magnetized Space, Serpentine Galleries, London
- 2011 Museo Nacional Centro de Arte Reina Sofía, Madrid
- 2017 Lygia Pape: A Multitude of Forms, Metropolitan Museum of Art, New York; catalog ISBN 978-1-588-39616-7
- 2018 Lygia Pape: Ttéia 1, C, Moderna Museet, Stockholm
- 2022 Lygia Pape. The Skin of ALL, Kunstsammlung Nordrhein-Westfalen, Düsseldorf

== Art market and estate ==
Pape did not work with a commercial gallery until later in life.

Projeto Lygia Pape, the artist's estate, was founded by the artist before her death in 2004 and is administered by her daughter Paula Pape. In 2017, Paula Pape filed a suit in the United States District Court for the Southern District of New York against LG Electronics, several vendors of its mobile phones and Getty Images Korea alleging an infringement of copyright of her mother's 2003 sculpture TtEia 1, C in packaging materials, advertising and promotions for the K20 V mobile phone.
