= Ivan Serpa =

Brazilian painter (1923–1973)

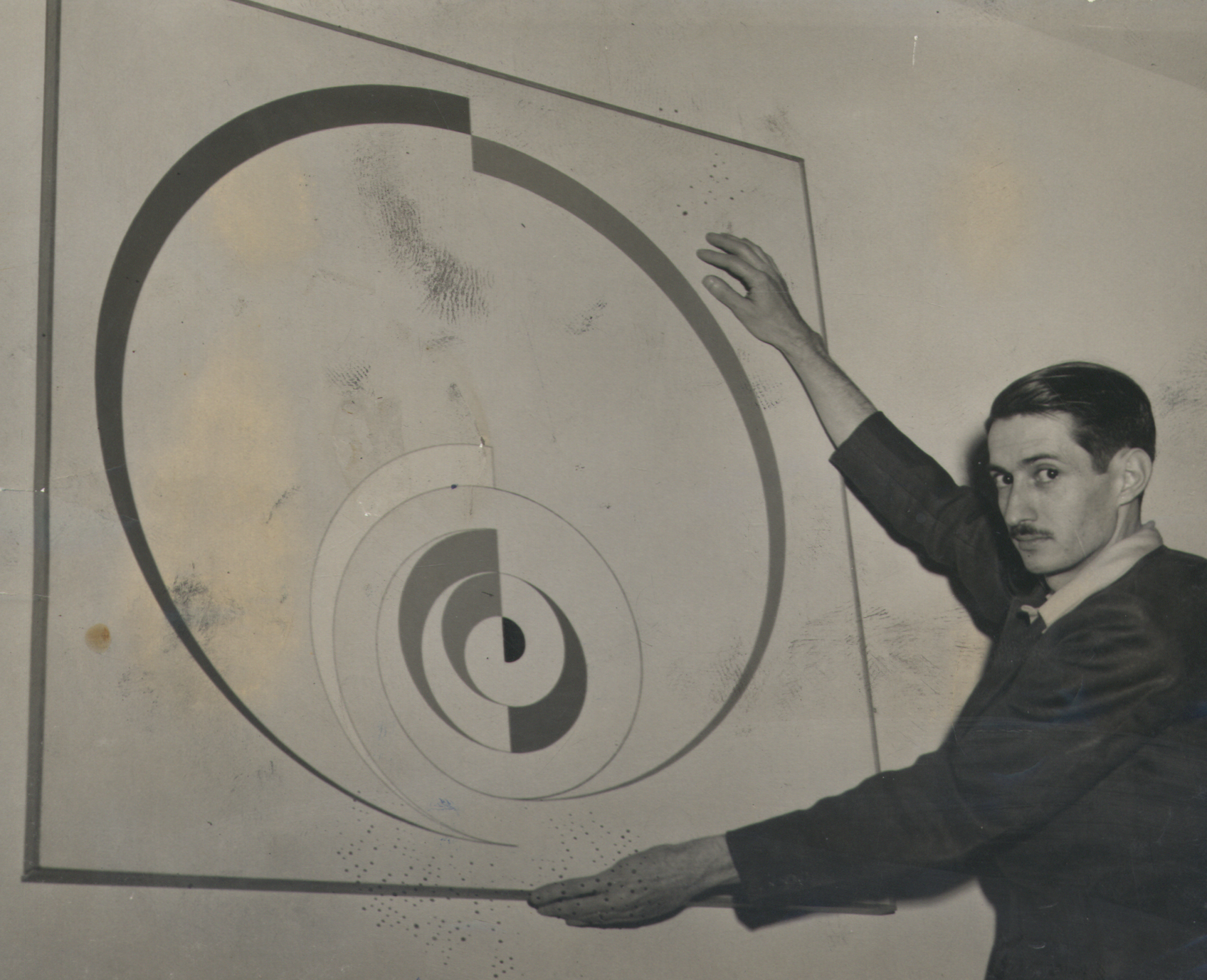
- Born: Ivan Ferreira Serpa; April 6, 1923; Rio de Janeiro, Brazil
- Died: April 6, 1973 (aged 50); Rio de Janeiro, Brazil
- Occupations: Painter; Draftsman; Printmaker; Designer; Educator
- Years active: 1951-1973
- Known for: Grupo Frente
- Spouse: Lygia Serpa
- Children: 3

Ivan Ferreira Serpa (April 6, 1923–April 6, 1973) was a Brazilian painter, draftsman, printmaker, designer, and educator active in the concrete art movement. Much of his work was in geometric abstractionism. He founded Grupo Frente, which included fellow artists Lygia Clark, Helio Oiticica, and Franz Weissmann, among others, and was known for mentoring many artists in Brazil.

== Early life and education ==
Serpa was born in the Tijuca neighborhood of Rio de Janeiro, Brazil.

From 1946 to 1948, Serpa studied printmaking with printmaker Axl Leskoschek in Rio de Janeiro. Serpa was also mentored by the art critic, Mário Pedrosa. But in general terms, Serpa did not have much formal training in art.

== Career ==
From 1949 and 1952, Serpa taught painting, sculpture, and art theory at the Museum of Modern Art, Rio de Janeiro, where he often held an open studio which incorporated critical review of student work with a new pedagogy of allowing instinctual exploration of innate creativity. The teaching style also reflected new ideas about national identity, and had a focus on the modern, incorporating ideas of democracy that were taking place in the country as a whole – all in direct contrast to the more traditional, European based art school model.

This weekly event became a salon for many up and coming artists that would later be major contributors to the neo-concrete and concrete art movement in Brazil.

Serpa had also previously taught art therapy to psychiatric patients at the Occupational Therapy center of the National Psychiatric Hospital in Brazil.

Serpa's first works were created in 1951. The paintings were serialized, and often incorporated architectural elements.

In 1954, Serpa co-founded Grupo Frente, which included artists Aluísio Carvão, Lygia Clark, Helio Oiticica, among others.

In 1954, Serpa published a book he wrote with Mario Pedrosa called, Crescimento e criação, which incorporated his work as a teaching children. He often gave free art classes to children.

From 1957 to 1959, Serpa won the foreign travel prize at the 6th Salão Nacional de Arte Moderna in Rio de Janeiro. This prize allowed him to travel to Europe, focusing on Italy and Spain, but also including France, Germany, Holland, Portugal, and Switzerland. During this time Serpa lived in Paris in 1957, where his work was displayed at concrete and neo-concrete art shows.

In the 1960s, Serpa worked as a paper conservator at the National Library. This work led to experimentation with paper collage, where he incorporated methodologies from the conservation, restoration, and preservation techniques he used in this position.

He often worked with Lygia Pape on art projects.

Serpa's 1962 series, Fase negra (Black Phase), reflected the political environment in Brazil at that time.

In mid-1960s, Serpa reconnected with geometric art, which moved his work toward kinetic and op art.

== Personal life ==
In 1949, Serpa married Lygia Serpa. They had a son, Yves Serpa, who was born in 1951; a daughter, Leila Serpa, born in 1955; and son, Heraldo Serpa, born in 1958.

In 1973, Serpa died on his 50th birthday from a heart attack and stroke.

== Selected exhibitions ==
Group exhibitions

- 1960: "Konkrete Kunst." 50 Jahre Entwicklung, Helmhaus (Zurich) [traveling exhibition]
- 1962: XXXI Biennale di Venezia (Venice)
- 1979: XV Bienal Internacional de Arte de São Paulo (São Paulo)
- 1984: "Tradição e ruptura. Sãntese de arte e cultura brasileras." Fundação Bienal de São Paulo (São Paulo)
- 1985: XVIII Bienal Internacional de Arte de São Paulo (São Paulo)
- 1987: "Modernidade. Art brésilien du 20e siècle." Musée d’art moderne de la Ville de Paris (Paris)
- 1989: XX Bienal Internacional de Arte de São Paulo (São Paulo)
- 1992: "Bilderwelt Brasilien." Kunsthaus Zürich (Zurich)
- 2000: "Século 20. Arte do Brasil." Fundação Calouste Gulbenkian, Centro de Arte Moderna José de Azeredo Perdigão (Lisbon)
- 2000–2: "Brasil 1920–1950. De la antropofagia a Brasãlia." Institut Valencià d’Art Modern, Centre Julio González, Valencia; Museu de Arte Brasileira (São Paulo)
- 2003: "Cuasi-corpus. Arte concreto y neoconcreto de Brasil." Museo de Arte Contemporáneo Internacional Ruãno Tamayo, Mexico City; Museo de Arte Contemporáneo (Monterrey)
- 2005–7: "Tropicália. A Revolution in Brazilian Culture (1967–1972)." Museum of Contemporary Art (Chicago); Barbican Art Gallery (London); Centro Cultural de Belêm (Lisbon); The Bronx Museum of the Arts (Bronx, New York)
- 2006: "The Sites of Latin American Abstraction." Cisneros Fontanals Art Foundation (Miami, Florida) [traveling exhibition]
- 2007: "Desenho construtivista brasileiro." Museu de Arte Moderna do Rio de Janeiro (Rio de Janeiro)
- 2007: "The Geometry of Hope. Latin American Abstract Art from the Patricia Phelps de Cisneros Collection." Blanton Museum of Art, The University of Texas at Austin (Austin, Texas); Grey Art Gallery, New York University (New York)
- 2008: "Time & Place. Rio de Janeiro 1956–1964." Moderna Museet (Stockholm)
- 2010: "Das Verlangen nach Form – O Desejo da Forma. Neoconcretismo und zeitgenössische Kunst aus Brasilien." Akademie der Künste, Berlin 2010 Vibración. Moderne Kunst aus Lateinamerika. The Ella Fontanals-Cisneros Collection, Bundeskunsthalle (Bonn)
- 2017–2018: "Making Art Concrete: Works from Argentina and Brazil in the Colección Patricia Phelps de Cisneros." Getty Center (Los Angeles, California) (August 29, 2017 – February 11, 2018)

Solo exhibitions

- 1954: "Collage and Painting." Pan American Union (Washington, D.C.) [catalogue]
- 1965: "Exposição de desenhos e guaches de Ivan Serpa (1963–5)." Museu de Arte Contemporânea da Universidade de São Paulo (São Paulo) [catalogue]
- 1968: "Pinturas." Galeria Bonino (Rio de Janeiro) [catalogue]
- 1967: Museu de Arte Moderna do Rio de Janeiro (Rio de Janeiro) [brochures] 1971 Desenhos 1946–1971, Museu de Arte Moderna do Rio de Janeiro (Rio de Janeiro) [catalogue]
- 1974: Retrospectiva, Museu de Arte Moderna do Rio de Janeiro (Rio de Janeiro) [catalogue] 1993 Retrospectiva, 1947–1973, Centro Cultural Banco do Brasil (Rio de Janeiro) [catalogue]
- 2012: "Ivan Serpa: Pioneering Abstraction in Brazil," Dickison Roundell (New York, NY) – November 1-December 21, 2012

== Selected works ==
- Faixas ritmadas at Museum of Fine Arts, Houston (1953)
- Abstracto II at the Museum of Modern Art (1954)
- Untitled at the Museum of Modern Art (1954)

== Awards ==
- 1947: 52nd Salão Nacional de Belas Artes, Rio de Janeiro, Bronze Medal for painting
- 1948: 52nd Salão Nacional de Belas Artes, Rio de Janeiro, Bronze Medal for painting
- 1951: Bienal Internacional de Arte de São Paulo, Prêmio Jovem Pintor/Best Young Painter prize for Formas (Forms)
- 1960: 1st Zürich Biennale, prize
- 1961: 6th São Paulo Bienal, ARDEA prize
- 1961: 5th Salão Nacional de Arte Moderna, Rio de Janeiro, acquisition prize

== Works and publications ==
- Pedrosa, Mário (texto de); Serpa, Ivan (seleção de) (1954). Crescimento e criação (in Portuguese). Rio de Janeiro: Museu de Arte Moderna do Rio de Janeiro. OCLC 948224248.
- Serpa, Ivan (1993). Ivan Serpa: Retrospectiva, 1947-1973 (Exhibition catalog) (in Portuguese). Rio de Janeiro: Centro Cultural Banco do Brasil. OCLC 29543613.
- Serpa, Ivan; Nathan, Hugo (curated by); zu Hohenlohe, Heinrich (curated by); Le Blanc, Aleca (essay by); Grosnick, Alicia (timeline by) (2012). Ivan Serpa: Pioneering Abstraction in Brazil (exhibition catalog). New York: Dickinson Roundell, Inc. OCLC 855211779. – Published by Dickinson, New York, on the occasion of the exhibition "Ivan Serpa: Pioneering Abstraction in Brazil," November 1 - December 21, 2012.

== See also ==
- Grupo Frente
