= Ferreira Gullar =

Brazilian writer (1930–2016)

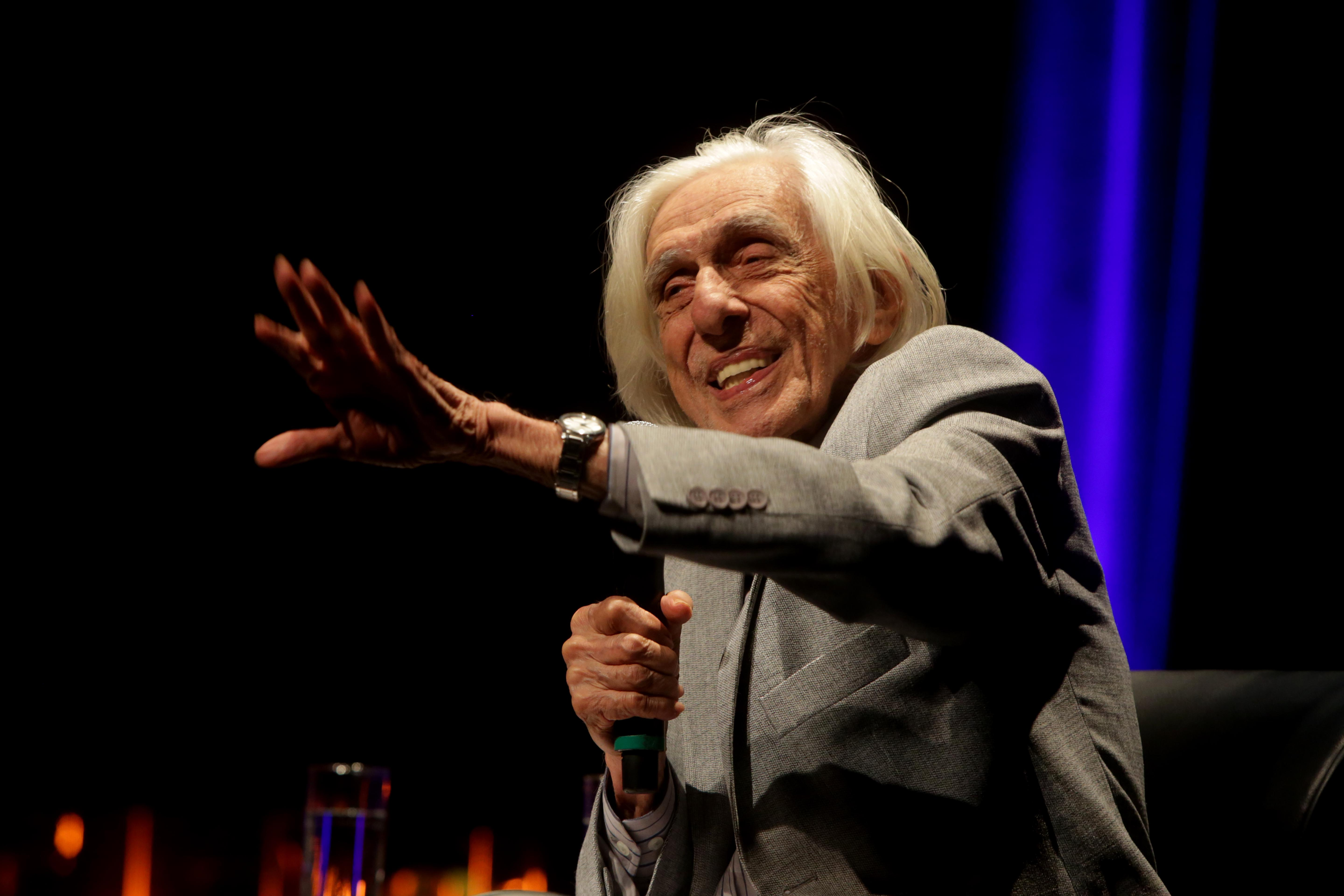
- Ferreira Gullar in 2009
- Born: José Ribamar Ferreira; September 10, 1930; São Luís, Maranhão, Brazil
- Died: December 4, 2016 (aged 86); Rio de Janeiro, Rio de Janeiro, Brazil
- Occupations: Poet, dramaturge, art critic, translator
- Spouse: Tereza Aragão
- Writing career
- Notable work: Poema Sujo
- Notable awards: Prémio da Associação Paulista dos Críticos de Arte (1976) Prémio Machado de Assis (2005) Prêmio Camões (2010)

José Ribamar Ferreira (September 10, 1930 – December 4, 2016), known by his pen name Ferreira Gullar, was a Brazilian poet, playwright, essayist, art critic, and television writer. In 1959, he was instrumental in the formation of the Neo-Concrete Movement.

== Influence of Neo-Concretes ==
The Neo-Concrete Manifesto was written in 1959 by Gullar and begins:

We use the term "neo-concrete" to differentiate ourselves from those committed to non-figurative "geometric" art (neoplasticism, constructivism, suprematism, the school of Ulm) and particularly the kind of concrete art that is influenced by a dangerously acute rationalism. In the light of their artistic experience, the painters, sculptors, engravers and writers participating in this first neo-concrete exhibition came to the conclusion that it was necessary to evaluate the theoretical principles on which concrete art has been founded, none of which offers a rationale for the expressive potential they feel their art contains.

As seen in this excerpt, the Neo-Concrete Movement seeks to move beyond the Concrete Artist's ideal of mathematical purity in art and embrace phenomenology. Gullar continues on in his manifesto to call for an artwork that “amounts to more than the sum of its constituent elements; something which analysis may break down into various elements but which can only be understood phenomenologically.” The Neo-Concretists believed artworks should interact with the spectator and make the spectator more aware of his or her physical body and metaphysical existence. It is only with the participation of the spectator that the artwork becomes complete.

== Early life, "Poema Sujo" and exile ==
Ferreira Gullar was born in São Luís, Maranhão, Northeast Brazil. He was exiled by the Brazilian dictatorship that lasted from 1964 to 1985, a period who saw him living in the Soviet Union, Chile, Peru and Argentina.

In 1975, while living in Argentina, Gullar wrote his best-known work, "Poema Sujo" ("Dirty Poem" in English), in which he attributes his decision to stop writing poetry to the increasing persecution of exiles, many of whom were found dead, and to hypothetical thoughts about his own death. He spent months writing the more than 2,000 verses that constitute the poem. "Dirty Poem" draws on his memories of childhood and adolescence in São Luís, Maranhão, and his anguish at being far from his homeland.

Gullar read the poem at Augusto Boal's house in Buenos Aires during a meeting organized by Vinicius de Moraes. The reading, recorded on tape, became well known among Brazilian intellectuals, who tried to guarantee Gullar's returned to Brazil in 1977, where he continued writing for newspapers and publishing books. He also had a weekly column in Brazilian newspaper Folha de S.Paulo, published on Sundays.

== Notability ==
In 2002 Gullar was honoured with a Prince Claus Award from the Dutch organisation, the Prince Claus Fund.

Gullar was considered one of the most influential Brazilians of the 20th century by Época magazine, and was awarded the Jabuti Prize for best fiction book in 2007. The magazine recalls its critical stance in opinion articles about the populism of former President Lula da Silva, posted in national newspaper Folha de S.Paulo.

On October 9, 2014, Gullar was elected as a member of the Brazilian Academy of Letters.

== Death ==
Gullar died of pneumonia on December 4, 2016.

== Bibliography ==
Poetry

- Um pouco acima do chão, 1949
- A luta corporal, 1954
- Poemas, 1958
- João Boa-Morte, cabra marcado para morrer (cordel), 1962
- Quem matou Aparecida? (cordel), 1962
- A luta corporal e novos poemas, 1966
- História de um valente, (cordel, na clandestinidade, como João Salgueiro), 1966
- Por você por mim, 1968
- Dentro da noite veloz, 1975
- Poema sujo, 1976
- Na vertigem do dia, 1980
- Crime na flora ou Ordem e progresso, 1986
- Barulhos, 1987
- O formigueiro, 1991
- Muitas vozes, 1999

Anthologies

- Antologia poética, 1977
- Toda poesia, 1980
- Ferreira Gullar - seleção de Beth Brait, 1981
- Os melhores poemas de Ferreira Gullar - seleção de Alfredo Bosi, 1983
- Poemas escolhidos, 1989

Short stories

- Gamação, 1996
- Cidades inventadas, 1997

Theater

- Um rubi no umbigo, 1979

Chronicles

- A estranha vida banal, 1989
- O menino e o arco-íris, 2001

Memories

- Rabo de foguete - Os anos de exílio, 1998

Biography

- Nise da Silveira: uma psiquiatra rebelde, 1996

Essays

- Teoria do não-objeto, 1959
- Cultura posta em questão, 1965
- Vanguarda e subdesenvolvimento, 1969
- Augusto do Anjos ou Vida e morte nordestina, 1977
- Tentativa de compreensão: arte concreta, arte neoconcreta - Uma contribuição brasileira, 1977
- Uma luz no chão, 1978
- Sobre arte, 1983
- Etapas da arte contemporânea: do cubismo à arte neoconcreta, 1985
- Indagações de hoje, 1989
- Argumentação contra a morte da arte, 1993
- O Grupo Frente e a reação neoconcreta, 1998
- Cultura posta em questão/Vanguarda e subdesenvolvimento, 2002
- Rembrandt, 2002
- Relâmpagos, 2003

Television

- Araponga - 1990/1991 (Rede Globo) - colaborador
- Dona Flor e Seus Dois Maridos - 1998 (Rede Globo) - colaborador
- Irmãos Coragem - 1995 (Rede Globo) - colaborador
