= Lygia Clark =

Brazilian artist

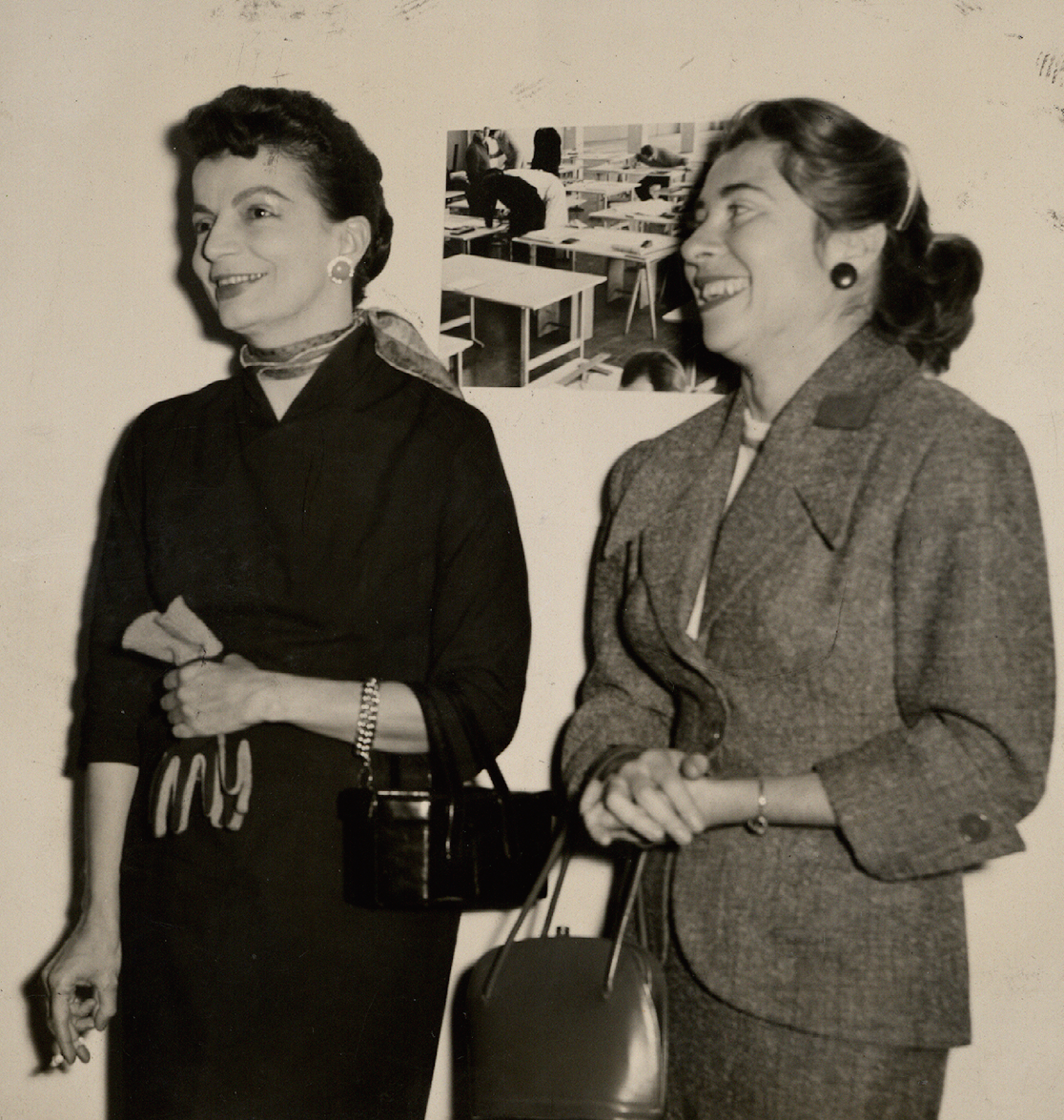
- Clark (left) and Fayga Ostrower
- Born: Lygia Pimentel Lins; 5 October 1920; Belo Horizonte, Brazil
- Died: 25 April 1988 (aged 67); Rio de Janeiro, Brazil
- Known for: Painting, Installation art
- Movement: Neo-Concrete Movement

Lygia Pimentel Lins (23 October 1920 – 25 April 1988), better known as Lygia Clark, was a Brazilian artist best known for her painting and installation work. She was often associated with the Brazilian Constructivist movements of the mid-20th century and the Tropicalia movement. Along with Brazilian artists Amilcar de Castro, Franz Weissmann, Lygia Pape and poet Ferreira Gullar, Clark co-founded the Neo-Concrete movement. From 1960 on, Clark discovered ways for viewers (who would later be referred to as "participants") to interact with her art works. Clark's work dealt with the relationship between inside and outside, and, ultimately, between self and world.

== Life ==
Clark was born in 1920 in Belo Horizonte, Brazil. In 1938, she married Aluízio Clark Ribeiro, a civil engineer, and moved to Rio de Janeiro, where she gave birth to three children between 1941 and 1945.

In 1947, she studied painting with Brazilian landscape architect Roberto Burle Marx and became an artist. Between 1950 and 1952, she studied with Isaac Dobrinsky, Fernand Léger and Arpad Szenes in Paris.

In 1953, she became one of the founding members of Rio's Frente group of artists. In 1957, Clark participated in Rio de Janeiro's first National Concrete Art Exhibition.

Clark soon became a prime figure among the Neo-concretists, whose 1959 manifesto called for abstract art to be more subjective and less rational and idealist. In 1960 she began to make her famous Bichos (Critters), hinged objects that could take many shapes and were meant to be physically manipulated by the viewer. In 1964 she began developing "propositions" anyone could enact using everyday materials like paper, plastic bags, and elastic. After 1966, Clark claimed to have abandoned art.

During Brazil's military dictatorship, Clark self-exiled to Paris, where in the 1970s she taught art classes at the Sorbonne. During this time, Clark also explored the idea of sensory perception through her art. Her art became a multi-sensory experience in which the spectator became an active participant. Between 1979 and 1988, Clark moved toward art therapy, using her objects in interactive sessions with patients. In 1977, Clark returned to Rio de Janeiro, Brazil, and she died of a heart attack in her home in 1988.

== Influences ==
Clark's early works were influenced by the Constructivist movement and other forms of European geometric abstraction, including the work of Max Bill, though she soon departed from the detached rationalism of much abstract art. Clark's early work reflected her interest in psychoanalysis, including the research of Sigmund Freud. She drew on the writings of French philosopher Maurice Merleau-Ponty, whose phenomenology resonated with the intertwining of subject and object she sought in her breakthrough work of the 1960s. Later in her career, her more holistic works displayed influences from experiences she had with psychotic and neurotic patients. Like many intellectuals of the 1950s and 60s, Clark was in therapy herself, and the propositions she was developing explored the frontier between art, therapy, and life.

== Nostalgia of the Body ==
In 1964, Clark began her Nostalgia of the Body series with the intention of abandoning the production of art objects in order to create art that was rooted in the senses. The Nostalgia of the Body works relied on participant's individual experiences occurring directly in their bodies. These pieces addressed the simultaneous existence of opposites within the same space: internal and external, metaphorical and literal, male and female. Her 1966 work Diálogo de mãos [Dialogue of Hands], a collaboration with Hélio Oiticica, bound together two participants' hands with a stretchy Möbius strip, and the movements of the two bodies created a cascade of stimuli and embodied response. Also in 1966, Clark created Pedra e ar [Stone and Air], a pebble perched upon a small plastic bag filled with air. The pressure of viewers' hands would cause the pebble to dance.

== Art therapy ==
Lygia Clark's sensory objects, also referred to as relational objects, contributed to the therapeutic and artistic process for patients that explored the inner and outer world. Incorporating her prior practices of the empty-full ideology, Clark's later work focused less on making the objects and more on facilitating an environment in which participants could realize their reality through the objects.

Clark's techniques in the 1970s sprouted art practices that were rooted in therapy and group healing. Her relational objects from experiments and workshops granted participants an experience to explore the self as part of a collective through their intentional actions and senses.

Art critic Guy Brett observed that Clark "produced many devices to dissolve the visual sense into an awareness of the body." Clark's later works focused heavily on the unconscious senses: touch, hearing, and smell. In her 1966 work, Breathe With Me, Clark formed a rubber tube into a circle and invited participants to hold the tube next to their ear. The participants could hear the sound of air entering and exiting the tube, which produced an individual sensory experience for each participant.

One of Clark's inspirations for rejuvenation and healing in art was derived from Michel Sapir, a psychoanalyst who placed a focus on verbal and physical input that directly influenced patients and their thoughts. With time to practice the craft, Clark eventually incorporated her own technique into her work by producing sensational constructs consisting of everyday materials.

Pedra e Ar (1966) marked Clark's initial sensorial object, emerging the same year that she was injured in a road accident. In this work, the plastic bag in which she was instructed to fasten to her broken hand was repurposed with a pebble and a band to produce a form of personal treatment. The action of compressing the air-packed bag between controlled hands simulated the rhythms of the natural body and its heartbeat, producing a healing process that Clark herself would utilize to recover from trauma. By activating and managing objects, Clark's artistic roots intersected with a therapeutic approach that investigated the self in relation to others and the external world.

Objects of common material akin to Pedra e Ar would continue to bloom throughout her career and encourage participation and interaction from viewers to influence the pieces. In another work, dubbed Rede de Elásticos (1974), observers joined Clark in constructing a sprawling, interconnected net. When complete, the massive object was then cast over its makers, all of whom stretched their limbs to the sky to manipulate the net's shape and presence. Through the elastic material, individuals became a collective body of both varied and shared movements. Clark's practices such as these worked to further connect spectators to interactive artworks, with efforts shifting toward the realization of self-discovery, body awareness, and personal perspective.

== Tropicália artistic movement ==
Clark is one of the most established artists associated with the Tropicália movement. Clark explored the role of sensory perception and psychic interaction that participants would have with her artwork. An example of Clark's fascination with human interaction is her 1967 piece O eu e o tu (The I and the You). The piece consists of two industrial rubber suits joined by an umbilical-like cord. The participants wearing the suits would be joined but unable to see one another, forming an almost psycho-sexual bond between the two. Clark said of her pieces, "What's important is the act of doing in the present; the artist is dissolved into the world."

== Stylistic periods ==
During the early part of Clark's career, she focused on creating small monochromatic paintings, which were done in black, gray, and white. During the 1960s, her work became more conceptual, and she used soft objects that could be manipulated by the art spectator. Clark later moved on to co-found the Neo-Concrete movement, which fellow Brazilian artist Hélio Oiticica then joined.

In the late 1950s, Clark and some of her contemporaries broke away from the Concrete group to start the Neo-Concrete movement. They published their manifesto in 1959.

Hélio Oiticica would soon join the group in the next year. The Neo-Concretists believed that art was a matter of the subject's experience in real time and space, but unlike the Minimalists in the U.S. who had some similar interests, Clark and the Neo-Concretists equated 'real space' with liveliness and the organic. In Clark's writings, she articulates that an artwork should not be considered "a ‘machine’ nor an "object," but rather, an "almost-body" which can only be made whole through viewer participation. Clark and Oiticica fused modern European geometric abstraction art with a Brazilian cultural flavor. The Brazilian Neo-Concrete movement borrowed their artistic ideas from Max Bill who was the director of the Ulm School of Design in Germany during the early 1950s.

Grega no. 4 (1955) at Glenstone in 2023

The Neo-Concretists were interested in how art could be used to "express complex human realities". They soon began making artworks the spectator could interact with physically, like Clark's Bichos (Critters), 1960–1963, which are ingenious arrangements of hinged metal plates that can fold flat, or be unfolded into three dimensions and manipulated into many different configurations. Interacting with these works, the spectator was meant to become more aware of his or her physical body and metaphysical existence. Viewer participation was essential for the artwork to be complete (in fact, Clark and Oiticica referred to the audience as "participants" rather than viewers. Clark described the exchange between viewer and Bicho as a dialogue between two living organisms.

After the 1964 Brazilian coup d'état and the military dictatorship that took power in the fallout, a counterculture movement grew in response to the government's increasing scrutiny on the public. At this point in time, Institutional Act Number Five was enacted and artists were forced into exile or fled the country out of fear of persecution. Clark spent these years in Paris where she taught at the Sorbonne, UFR d'Arts Plastiques et Sciences de l'Art de l'Université de Paris 1, a newly founded school remarkable for its open, experimental model in contrast to the more traditional beaux-arts academy format.

During the 1970s, Clark explored the role of sensory perception and psychic interaction that the participants would have with her artwork. She referred to this as "ritual without myth".

Clark's later, more famous works were viewed as "living experiences," a focus she had for three decades of her career. She did not separate the mind from the body and believed that art should be experienced through all five senses. After 1963, Clark's work could no longer exist outside of a participant's experience. Her art became an interactive experience. She believed that a viewer, or "participant", served an active and important function in the art world. In most museums, works are affixed to a stand or on the wall, while Clark's works were meant to be manipulated by the viewer/participant. Her belief was that art should be a multi-sensory experience, not just one enjoyed through the eyes. At one point she wrote, "We are the proposers: our proposition is that of dialogue. Alone, we do not exist. We are at your mercy," she then went on to say, "We are the proposers: we have buried the work of art as such and we call upon you so that thought may survive through your action."

One of her most recognized interactive art pieces is Baba Antropofágica. Participants would moisten strings with their saliva and drape the material over a single participant's partially exposed body. This piece was inspired by a dream that Clark had about an anonymous substance that streamed out from her mouth. This experience was not a pleasurable one for Clark. She viewed it as the vomiting of a lived experience that, in turn, was swallowed by others.

During the latter part of her career, Clark focused more on art therapy and less on the actual creation of a work, however her work as a whole was always psychoanalytically oriented. When she returned to Rio de Janeiro in 1976, Clark's therapeutic focus rested upon the memory of trauma. When she changed her creative direction in 1971, she wrote "I discovered that the body is the house...and that the more we become aware of it the more we rediscover the body as an unfolding totality." She wanted to uncover why the power of certain objects brought about a vivid memory in her psychotherapy patients so that she could treat their psychosis. Depending upon the individual, the sessions could be short-term or long-term, in which treatment came about through the relationship between the relationship object and how the participant interpreted its meaning.

== Reception ==
Clark's work was included in the 2021 exhibition Women in Abstraction at the Centre Pompidou. In 2024 she was exhibited in London's White Chapel Gallery. In 2025 her work was shown in a retrospective in Berlin's Neue National Galery and Zürich's Kunsthaus.

== Collections ==
Clark's work is held in collections worldwide, including MoMA (New York), Tate Modern (London), the Museum of Fine Arts (Houston); the Menil Collection (Houston); Museum of Modern Art, Rio de Janeiro (Rio de Janeiro), Museo Nacional Centro de Arte Reina Sofia (Madrid), Walker Art Center (Minneapolis), and Centre Pompidou (Paris).

== Art market ==
At Sotheby's in 2014, Clark's aluminum folding sculpture Bicho-Em-Si-Md (No. IV) (1960) was sold at $1.2 million, doubling its high estimate of $600,000.

== Bibliography ==
- Guy Brett, "The Proposal of Lygia Clark". In: Catherine de Zegher (ed.), Inside the Visible. The Institute of Contemporary Art, Boston & MIT Press, 1996.
- Lygia Clark, "Nostalgia of the Body". In: October. The Second Decade, 1986-1996. October Books / MIT Press, 1997.
- Cornelia Butler and Luis Pérez-Oramas, Lygia Clark: The Abandonment of Art, 1948-1988 (New York: The Museum of Modern Art), 2014.
- Lygia Clark. Retrospective, Irina Hiebert Grun, Maike Steinkamp, Catherine Hug, E. A. Seemann Verlag, Leipzig, 2025, ISBN 978-3-69001-001-6
