= Brazilian pavilion =

Venice Biennale national pavilion

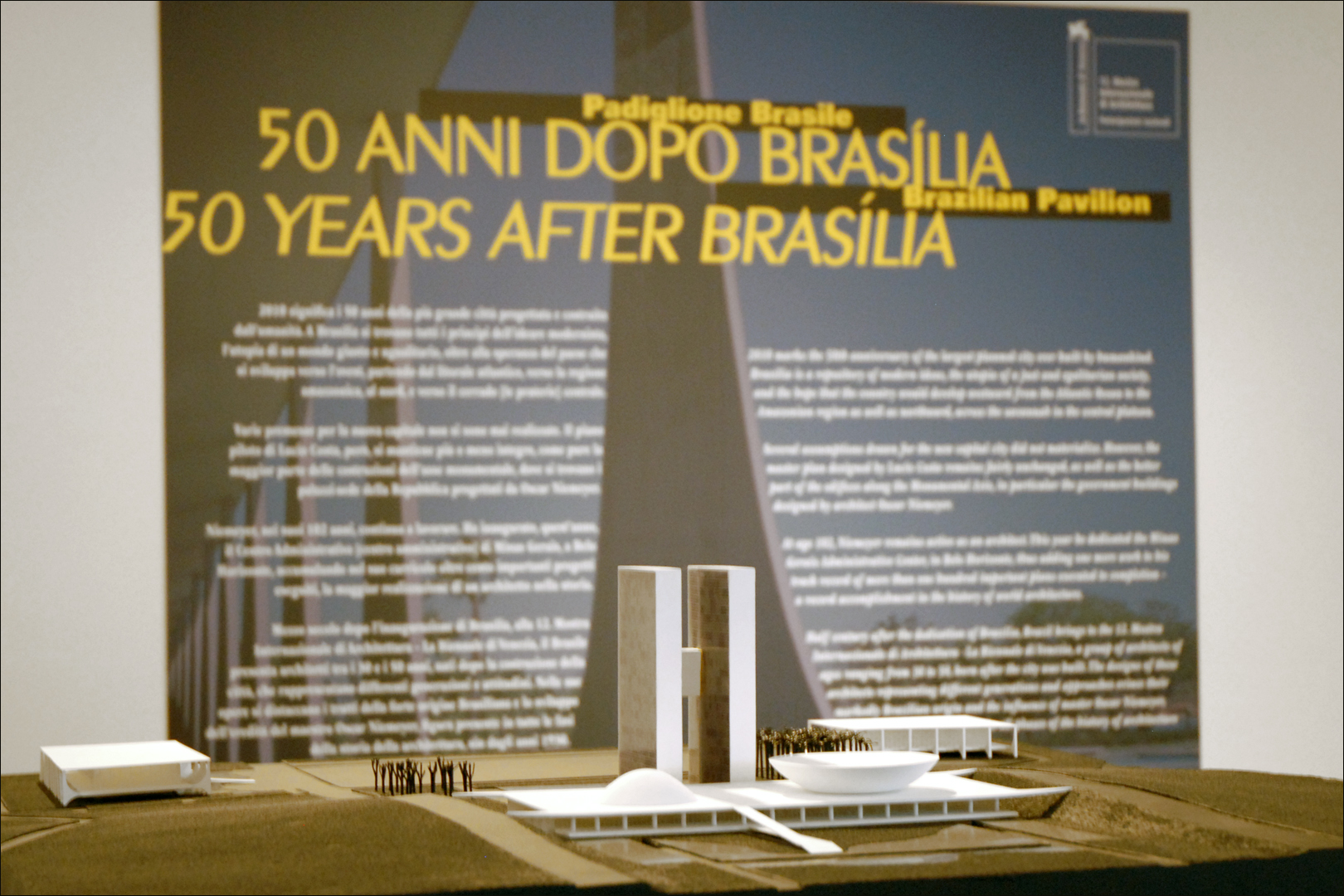
Le pavillon du Brésil (Venise) (4983470376)

The Brazilian pavilion houses Brazil's national representation during the Venice Biennale arts festivals.

== Background ==
The Venice Biennale is an international art biennial exhibition held in Venice, Italy. Often described as "the Olympics of the art world", participation in the Biennale is a prestigious event for contemporary artists. The festival has become a constellation of shows: a central exhibition curated by that year's artistic director, national pavilions hosted by individual nations, and independent exhibitions held throughout Venice. The Biennale's parent organisation also runs regular festivals in other arts: architecture, dance, film, music and theatre.

Outside the central international exhibition, individual nations produce their own shows, known as pavilions, as their national representation. Nations that own their pavilion buildings – such as the 30 housed in the Giardini – are responsible for their own upkeep and construction costs as well. Nations without dedicated buildings create pavilions in venues throughout the city.

== Organization and building ==
The pavilion was designed by Amerigo Marchesin and built in 1964.

== Representation by year ==
=== Art ===
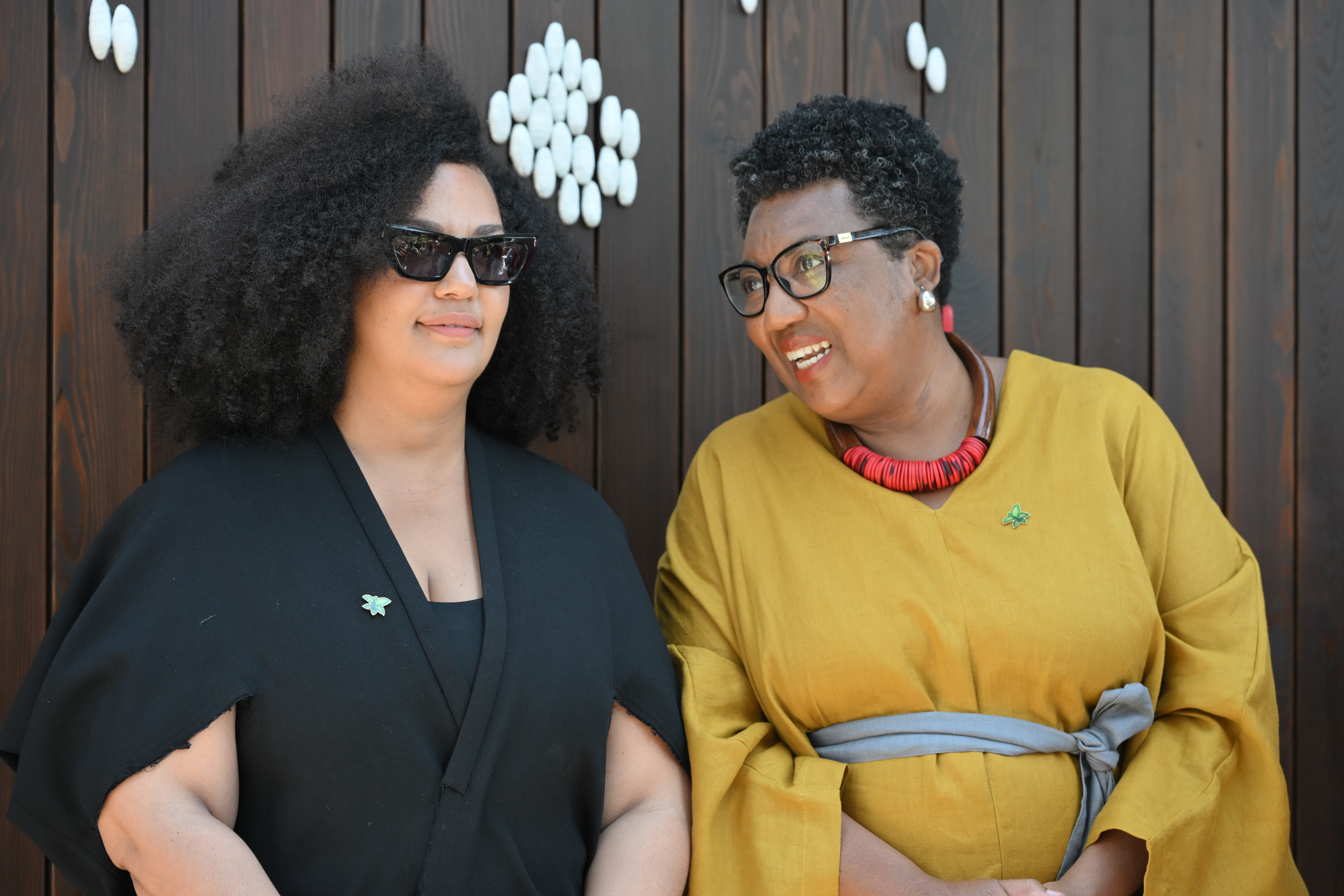
Diane Lima und Rosana Paulino at the Biennale di Venezia 2026

- 1950 — Roberto Burle Marx, Milton Dacosta, Cicero Dias, Emiliano Di Cavalcanti, Flavio de Carvalho, Candido Portinari, José Pancetti, Bruno Giorgi, Victor Brecheret, Livio Abramo, Oswaldo Goeldi
- 1958 — Lasar Segall
- 1956 — Aldemir Martins
- 1960 — Antonio Bandeira, Danilo Di Prete, Manabu Mabe, Aloisio Magalhães, Teresa Nicolao, Loio-Pérsio, Mário Cravo Júnior
- 1962 — Alfredo Volpi, Anna Letycia Quadros, Fernando Jackson Ribeiro, Gilvan Samico, Iberê Camargo, Isabel Pons, Ivan Serpa, Lygia Clark, Marcelo Grassmann, Rossini Quintas Perez, Rubem Valentim
- 1964 — Abraham Palatnik, Alfredo Volpi, Almir Mavignier, Franz Weissmann, Frans Krajcberg, Glauco Rodrigues, Tarsila do Amaral
- 1966 — Chico da Silva, Sergio de Camargo
- 1968 — Lygia Clark
- 1970 — Mary Vieira, Roberto Burle Marx
- 1972 — Humberto Espíndola, Paulo Roberto Leal, Franz Weissmann
- 1976 — Claudio Tozzi, Evandro Carlos Jardim, Regina Vater, Sergio Augusto Porto, Vera Chaves Barcellos
- 1978 — Carlos Fajardo, G. T. O. (Geraldo Telles de Oliveira), Julio Martins da Silva, Luiz Aquila da Rocha Miranda, Maria Auxiliadora da Silva, Maria Madalena Santos Reinbolt, Paulo Gomes Garcez, Wilma Martins
- 1980 — Anna Bella Geiger, Antonio Dias, Carlos Vergara, Paulo Roberto Leal
- 1982 — Tunga, Sérgio de Camargo
- 1984 — Eduardo Sued, Luiz Paulo Baravelli
- 1986 — Gastão Manoel Henrique, Geraldo de Barros, Renina Katz, Washington Novaes
- 1988 — José Resende, Juraci Dórea
- 1990 — Frida Baranek, Daniel Senise, Francisco Brennand, Gilvan Samico, Wesley Duke Lee
- 1993 — Angelo Venosa, Carlos Fajardo, Emmanuel Nassar
- 1995 — Arthur Bispo do Rosário, Nuno Ramos
- 1997 — Jac Leirner, Waltercio Caldas (Curator: Paulo Herkenhoff)
- 1999 — Iran do Espírito Santo, Nelson Leirner (Curator: Ivo Mesquita)
- 2001 — Vik Muniz, Ernesto Neto, Miguel Rio Branco, Tunga, (Curator: Germano Celant)
- 2003 — Beatriz Milhazes, Rosângela Rennó (Curator: Alfons Hug)
- 2005 — Chelpa Ferro, Caio Reisewitz (Curator: Alfons Hug)
- 2007 — José Damasceno, Detanico & Lain (Curator: Jacopo Crivelli Visconti)
- 2009 — Luiz Braga, Delson Uchôa (Curator: Ivo Mesquita)
- 2011 — Artur Barrio (Curators: Moacir dos Anjos, Agnaldo Farias)
- 2013 — Hélio Fervenza, Odires Mlászho, Lygia Clark, Max Bill, Bruno Munari (Curator: Luis Pérez-Oramas)
- 2015 — André Komatsu, Antonio Manuel, Berna Reale (Curator: Luiz Camillo Osorio)
- 2017 — Cinthia Marcelle (Curator: Jochen Volz)
- 2019 — Benjamin de Burca and Bárbara Wagner (Curator: Gabriel Pérez-Barreiro)
- 2022 — Jonathas de Andrade (Curators: Jacopo Crivelli Visconti)
- 2024 – Glicéria Tupinambá (Curators: Arissana Pataxó, Denilson Baniwa, Gustavo Caboco Wapichana)
- 2026 – Rosana Paulino and Adriana Varejão (Curator: Diane Lima)

== Bibliography ==
- Russeth, Andrew (April 17, 2019). "The Venice Biennale: Everything You Could Ever Want to Know". ARTnews.
- Volpi, Cristiana (2013). "Brazil". In Re Rebaudengo, Adele (ed.). Pavilions and Garden of Venice Biennale. Rome: Contrasto. p. 192. ISBN 978-88-6965-440-4.
