= Maria Helena Andrés =

Brazilian painter, writer and teacher (born 1922)

- Born: Maria Helena Coelho Ribeiro; 2 August 1922 (age 104); Belo Horizonte, Minas Gerais, Brazil
- Other name: Maria Helena Coelho Andrés Ribeiro
- Education: Escola do Parque, 1947; Art Students League of New York, 1961
- Occupations: Painter; drafter; illustrator; writer; teacher
- Spouse: Luiz Andrés Ribeiro de Oliveira (m. 1947; died 1977)
- Children: 6

Maria Helena Coelho Andrés Ribeiro (née Coelho Ribeiro; born 2 August 1922), known professionally as Maria Helena Andrés, is a Brazilian painter, drafter, illustrator, writer and teacher.

== Early life and education ==
Maria Helena Coelho Ribeiro was born on 2 August 1922 in Belo Horizonte, Minas Gerais to Euler de Sales Coelho (1895–1956), a lawyer, judge and later federal deputy, and Nair Barroso de Sales Coelho. In May 1930, Andrés' father was elected the federal deputy for Minas Gerais and the family moved to Rio de Janeiro. Following the outbreak of the Revolution of 1930, the family returned to Belo Horizonte. One of seven children, Andrés was educated at the Colégio Sagrado Coração de Maria.

During 1940 and 1944, Andrés studied painting under Carlos Chambelland in Rio de Janeiro. Upon returning to Belo Horizonte, Andrés studied at the Escola do Parque under Alberto da Veiga Guignard and Edith Behring between 1944 and 1947.

== Career ==
From 1950 to 1970, Andrés taught painting and drawing at the Escola de Belas Artes de Belo Horizonte. During the 1950s, Andrés embraced the concrete art movement and joined the grupo concretista mineiro.

In 1961, Andrés won a scholarship to study for 4 months at the Art Students League of New York where she studied under Theodoros Stamos. During the 1970s, Andrés began visiting Nepal, Tibet, Japan, Thailand, and India where she participated in seminars and lectures.

In 1989, Andrés taught art at the International Holistic University in Brasília.

== Personal life ==
In 1947, Andrés married Luiz Andrés Ribeiro de Oliveira (died 1977), a physician. Andrés and Ribeiro had six children.

On 2 August 2022, Andrés turned 100.

== Bibliography ==
- Andrés, Maria Helena (1965). Vivência e Arte. AGIR.
- Andrés, Maria Helena (1977). Os Caminhos da Arte. Editora Vozes.
- Andrés, Maria Helena (1984). Oriente-Ocidente: Integração de Culturas.
- Andrés, Maria Helena (1998). Maria Helena Andrés: Depoimentos.
