= Untitled 78 (print) =

Art print by Artur Silva

Untitled #78
- Artist: Artur Silva
- Year: 2012
- Dimensions: 121 cm × 212 cm (47.5 in × 83.5 in)
- Location: Eskenazi Health; Indianapolis, Indiana, United States; 39°46′41″N 86°11′03″W
- Owner: Eskenazi Health

Untitled #78 is a digital inkjet print by artist Artur Silva located in the Eskenazi Health Outpatient Care Center on the Sidney and Lois Eskenazi Hospital campus, near downtown Indianapolis, Indiana, and is part of the Eskenazi Health Art Collection.

== Description ==
Untitled #78 is a digital inkjet print created by artist Artur Silva, which features a single image composed of colors, images, and patterns derived from existing textile patterns. These works include an array of references from across the globe, including representations of American textile patterns from the 1960s, official states’ quilts, and African patterns. Together with Untitled #77, Untitled #78 was specifically created for a waiting room at Sidney and Lois Eskenazi Hospital and was inspired by Wayman Adams' painted children's portraits, which are part of the hospital organization's historic art collection:

“I thought about a concept that could represent the true diversity the population of Indianapolis. The method I chose to do was by exploring textile patterns to engage in a much broader dialogue about the movement of ideas, cultures, and people. My works were inspired by the 1914 Wayman Adams project in which he created 20 portraits of children from different ethnicities for the pediatric unit. The prints I created utilize textile patterns from Asia to Africa and the Americas. They are both explorative and familiar. I wanted these works to reflect the diversity of the population of Indianapolis in the 21st century. The end result is a set of prints that are feminine, energetic and contrasting.” -Artur Silva

== Historical information ==
=== Acquisition ===
Untitled #78 was commissioned by Eskenazi Health as part of a re-imagining of the organization's historical art collection and to support "the sense of optimism, vitality and energy" of its new campus in 2013. In response to its nationwide request for proposals, Eskenazi Health received more than 500 submissions from 39 states, which were then narrowed to 54 finalists by an independent jury. Each of the 54 proposals was assigned an area of the new hospital by Eskenazi Health's art committee and publicly displayed in the existing Wishard Hospital and online for public comment; more than 3,000 public comments on the final proposals were collected and analyzed in the final selection.

=== Location ===
Untitled #78 is currently displayed in the Women's Specialties Waiting Room on the fifth level of the Eskenazi Health Outpatient Care Center on the Sidney & Lois Eskenazi Hospital campus.

== Artist ==
Artur Silva was born and raised in Belo Horizonte, Brazil. There, he attended the Guignard University of Art before moving to New York City and then to Indianapolis in 2001. Silva's work has been exhibited at Harrison Center for the Arts, Editions Limited, Marian College and Big Car Gallery in Indianapolis as well as at Convento Gallery in Belo Horizonte, Half Dozen Gallery in Portland, Oregon, and NavtaSchultz Gallery in Chicago. His work is included in the collections of the Indiana State Museum and the Fort Wayne Museum of Art. Silva's work has earned both local and regional awards, including an individual artist grant from the Indiana Arts Commission, a Creative Renewal Fellowship from the Arts Council of Indianapolis, a grant from the National Association of Latino Arts and Culture, an Efroymson Contemporary Art Fellowship and a Midwest Visions grant for residency at the Ox-Bow School of Art in Michigan.

== See also ==
- Eskenazi Health Art Collection
- Sidney & Lois Eskenazi Hospital
