= Artur Silva (artist) =

Muralist and multimedia artist from Brazil

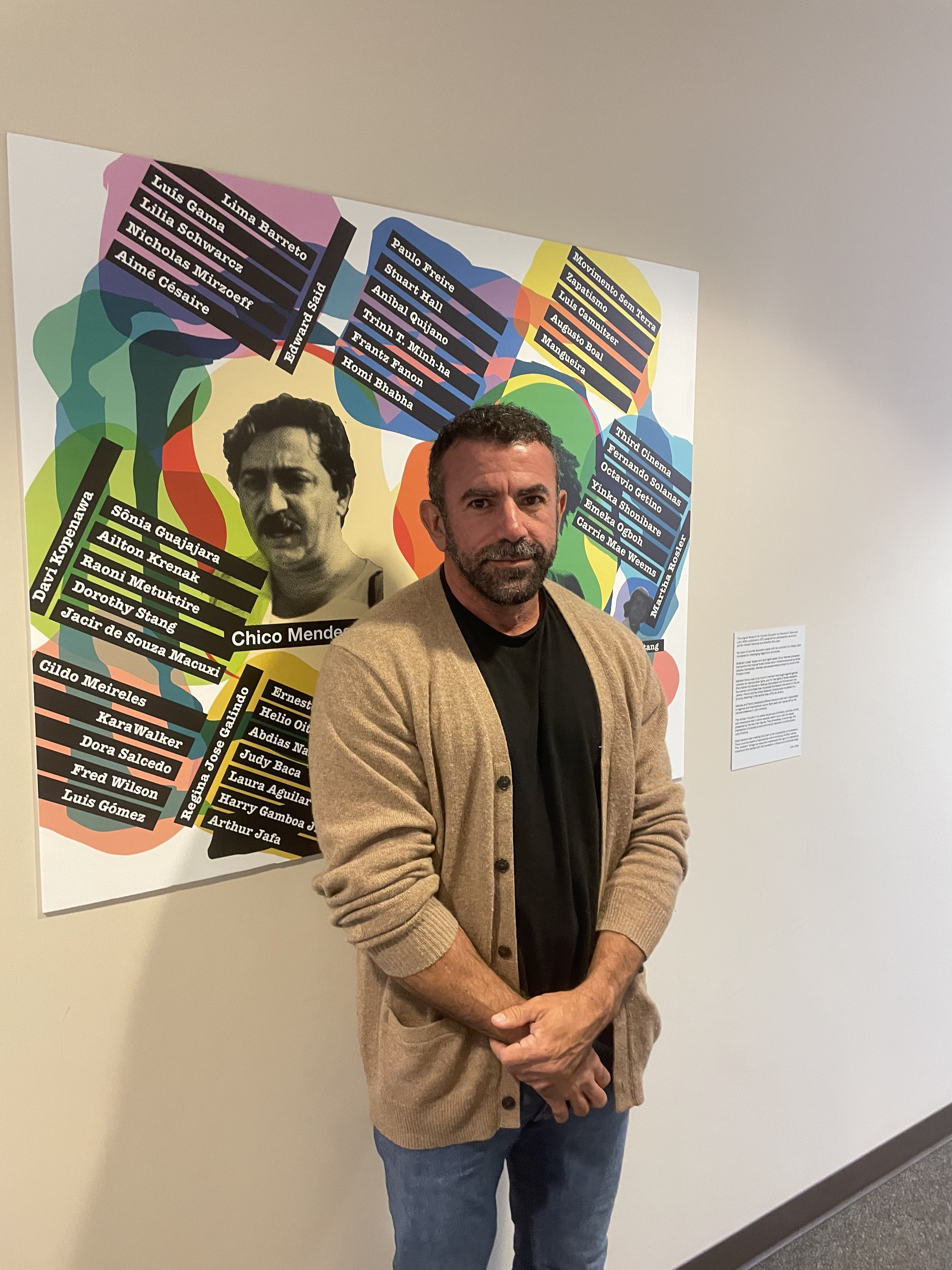
- Born: 1976 (age 49–50); Belo Horizonte
- Education: Guignard University of Art of Minas Gerais and California Institute of the Arts
- Known for: Public art, murals, and multimedia
- Notable work: Untitled 77 (print), Untitled 78 (print)
- Website: artursilva.com

Artur Silva (born 1976) is a Brazilian artist who works in Indianapolis in the United States. His work has been shown at the Ludwig Foundation, the VanAbbe Museum, the Smart Museum, the Indiana State Museum, and the Centro Cultural de España. His work has resulted in awards and fellowships, including from the Pollock-Krasner Foundation, the Foundation for Contemporary Arts, the Arts Council of Indianapolis, the Efroymson Contemporary Art Fellowship from the Central Indiana Community Foundation, and the Christel DeHaan Artist of Distinction Award.

== Life ==
Artur Silva was born in Belo Horizonte, Brazil in 1976. He began creating art at the age of sixteen and attributes a fascination with the Encyclopedia of Britannica as an inspiration for his early interest in art. He completed a BFA at the Guignard School of Art in Belo Horizonte.

In 1996, he emigrated to the United States, first to New York City and then to Indianapolis. Silva's first studio in Indianapolis was at the Harrison Center.

Silva briefly left Indianapolis to attend the California Institute of the Arts to complete a master's degree.

Silva's work in Indianapolis led to a position on the board of the Indianapolis Downtown Artists & Dealers Association.

== Work ==
Silva's work includes multimedia, collage, painting, sculpture, digital media, photography, and murals. His work has been shown at the Harrison Gallery, Ludwig Foundation, the VanAbbe Museum, the Smart Museum, the Centro Cultural de España, the Turf IDADA Art Pavilion, the Fort Wayne Museum of Art, the North Main Street Gateway in Evansville, the Alexander Hotel (Indianapolis), Union Station, the Indiana State Museum, the Cummins, Inc. headquarters, the Indianapolis Artsgarden, Gainbridge Fieldhouse, and the Indianapolis International Airport, White River State Park, and Massachusetts Avenue.

In 2008, Silva began to host dance parties with D.J. Kyle Long that combined Brazilian music and with art. Branded "Cultural Cannibals" (which includes clothing apparel) the parties featured Silva's films with music by Long. In 2014, these included a Carnaval event at The Jazz Kitchen. The party included the Indiana University Percussion Ensemble led by Michael Spiro.

In 2011 he completed a mural, "The Death of Ambition," that was featured in story by The New York Times about Super Bowl XLVI and art in Indianapolis. The work was digitally designed and installed one block from the football stadium at Union Station. It featured a self-portrait of the artist dressed as an astronaut.

In 2012 he completed an installation of a sculpture, "Rock Steady Gravity Sketch," near an apartment buildings at intersection of 10th Street and Indiana Avenue in Indianapolis. The sculpture was intended to celebrate the culture of breakdancing, hip-hop, and the Jazz Age in Indianapolis. However, soon after installation, a college student fell from a nearby balcony while fleeing the police at a party. Following news coverage, the sculpture was removed because it may have reminded people of the student's death.

Along with Carmen Amengual, he cofounded The Laboratory for Latin American Art/Thinking (LATlab) in 2017. The arts organization focused on exploring and investigating the shared experiences of artists from Latin American backgrounds.

In 2020, Silva worked with an apprentice, Shaunt'e Lewis, to create a mural in response to the COVID pandemic. The mural, "Anatomy of a Moment," was supported by the Arts Council of Indianapolis and Jiffy Lube. That same year, he worked to complete a film documenting the creation of the Black Lives Matter street mural in Indianapolis.

Silva was the first resident fellow of the Speculative Play and Just Futurities program at Indiana Arts and Humanities Institute at Indiana University in Indianapolis. His residency focused on Giovanni Belzoni and colonialism in cultural heritage organizations such as the British Museum.

== Fellowships and awards ==
Silva has received grants and fellowships from the Pollock-Krasner Foundation, the Foundation for Contemporary Art, and the Central Indiana Community Foundation.

== Selected works and exhibits ==
- Tutti Frutti - A Fresh Take on the Classics, Sainte Anne Gallery, Paris, France, 2023. (Group exhibit).
- Spasmodic 1 & 2, Gainbridge Fieldhouse, Indianapolis, Indiana, 2022. (Public art, murals).
- Transaction Boundaries, Centro Cultural de España en México, Mexico City, 2017 (Solo exhibit).
- Rocksteady Gravity Sketch. Indianapolis, Indiana. 2012. (Public sculpture).
- The Death of Ambition. Indianapolis, Indiana. 2011. (Public art, mural).
- Fliperama Rhapsody, Half/Dozen Gallery, Portland, Oregon, 2010 (Solo exhibit).
- Making it in the Midwest, Indiana State Museum, Indianapolis, Indiana, 2009. (Group exhibit).
- Heartland, Smart Museum of Art, The University of Chicago, 2009. (Group exhibit).
