= Mary Vieira =

Brazilian sculptor

Mary Vieira (1927–2001) was a Brazilian sculptor. She was born and raised in Minas Gerais. She at the studied with Alberto da Veiga Guignard in Belo Horizonte. She also studied sculpture with Franz Weissmann and Amilcar de Castro. In 1947, she exhibited in Belo Horizonte Municipality’s Hall of Brazilian Young Artists.

== Mary Vieira in Europe ==
In 1951, Mary Vieira settled in Europe to work with the Swiss artist Max Bill. In 1953, Vieira won the Rio de Janeiro’s Museum of Modern Art “Brazilian Sculpture” Award in São Paulo’s 2nd Biennial. In 1954, at Bill's invitation, she participated in the Constructivist Gruppe Allianz’s last exhibition. In 1957, Mary Vieira married Italian poet and critic Carlo Belloli, intensifying a key intellectual dialog for her aesthetic journey. The couple lived and worked between Switzerland, Italy, and Brazil. In Europe, she delved into her proposals of dynamic shaped sculptures that are successively classified as: monovolumes, multivolumes, polyvolumes, and intervolumes. One of her best known pieces, "Polyvolume: Meeting Point," was fabricated between 1960 and 1970 for installation in the Itamaraty Palace in Brazil's new capital, Brasília. The artist is recognized by international critics as one of kinetic art’s major representatives. In 1966, she was given the “International Marinetti Award for Plastic Research on Kinevisual Expression” on the occasion of the 20th foundation anniversary of the “Salons des Réalités Nouvelles” in Paris’s Municipal Museum of Modern Art.

== Mary Vieira around the world ==
Many of her art pieces are installed in public places in Brazil, such as Belo Horizonte’s Rio Branco Square; São Paulo’s Ibirapuera Park; and Brasília’s Ministry of Foreign Affairs; and abroad, such as the Basel University Library; Italy’s Monte Castello; and in Zurich’s Lake Seefeldquai Park. Further to her sculptures, she developed a number of projects as urbanist, graphic designer, and teacher. She took part in individual as well as collective exhibitions in Europe, Brazil and United States, being awarded a number of important prizes for her work. Mary Vieira died in Basel in 2001.

== Mary Vieira and her work ==
Mary Vieira used to call herself a plastic ideaer. She anticipated divisions between the categories of drawing, painting, sculpture and architecture would be extinguished, and considered interdisciplinarity to be key for the evolution of art. The main concepts in her work are absolutely contemporary. Taking along some models she had idealized before in Brazil, she moved to Switzerland in 1951. In 1952, she was invited to publish the Zeiten einer Zeichnung series for Spirale, major concretist publishers of the time. And there lies the whole essence of her oeuvre, which unfolds from concretism to kinetic art, or, more precisely, to cinevisualism. As Italian critic and poet Carlo Belloli pointed out, Mary Vieira’s oeuvre summons the spectator to art. The coherence, the precision, and the comprehensiveness of the artist’s aesthetic view have never been totally displayed in her home country.

== Mary Vieira and her archive ==
The Mary Vieira Archive is managed by ISISUF—Isituto Internazionale di Studi sul Futurismo, Milano, Italy.
