= Praça da Sé =

Square in Sao Paulo, Brazil

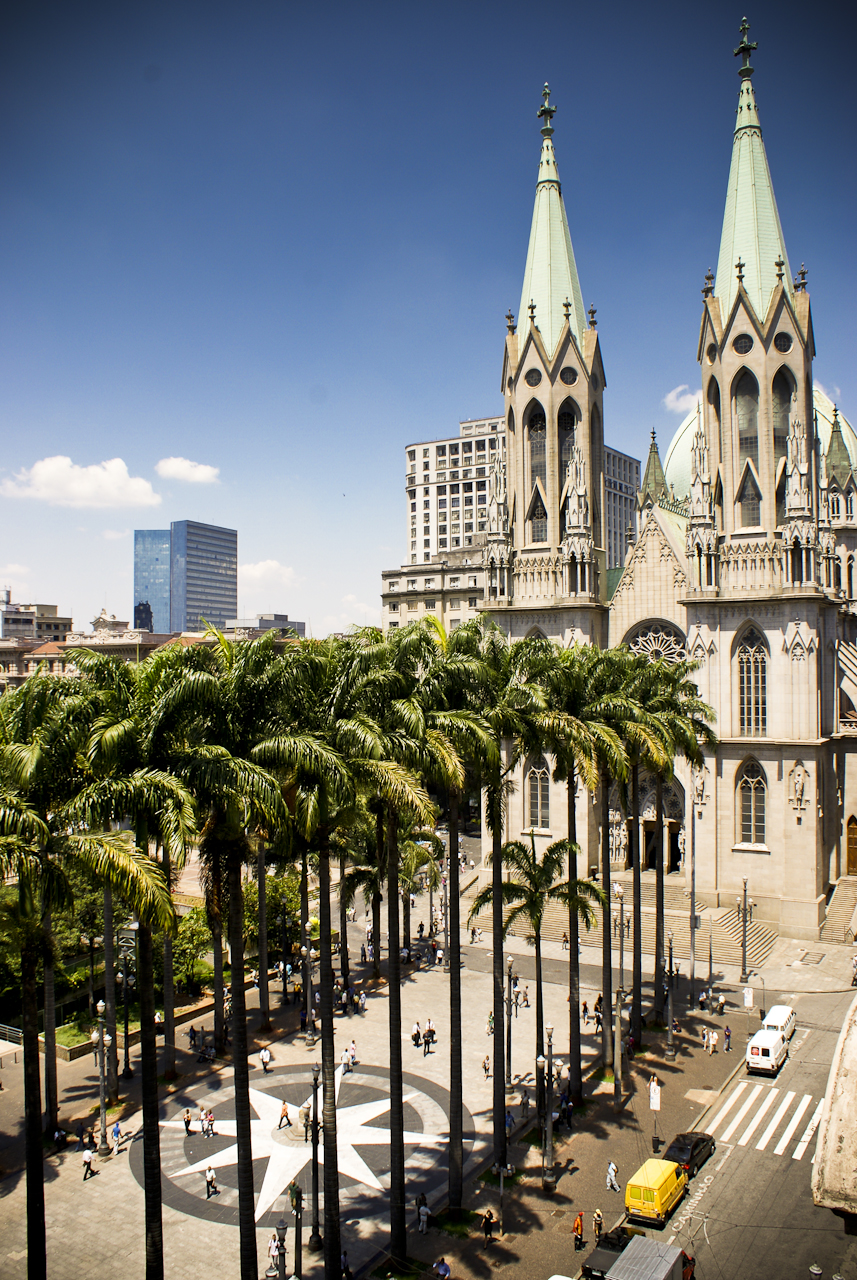
- Praça da Sé with São Paulo Cathedral in the background.

- Location within São Paulo Location within Brazil
- Location: São Paulo, Brazil
- Coordinates: 23°33′01″S 46°38′02″W
- Area: 47,000 m^{2} (510,000 sq ft)
- Opened: 1970

Praça da Sé (English: See Square) is a public space in São Paulo, Brazil. Considered as the city's central point, it is the point from where the distance of all roads passing through São Paulo are counted. The square was the location of many historical events in São Paulo's history, most notably during the Diretas Já movement. The name originates from the episcopal see of the city, the São Paulo Cathedral.

== History ==
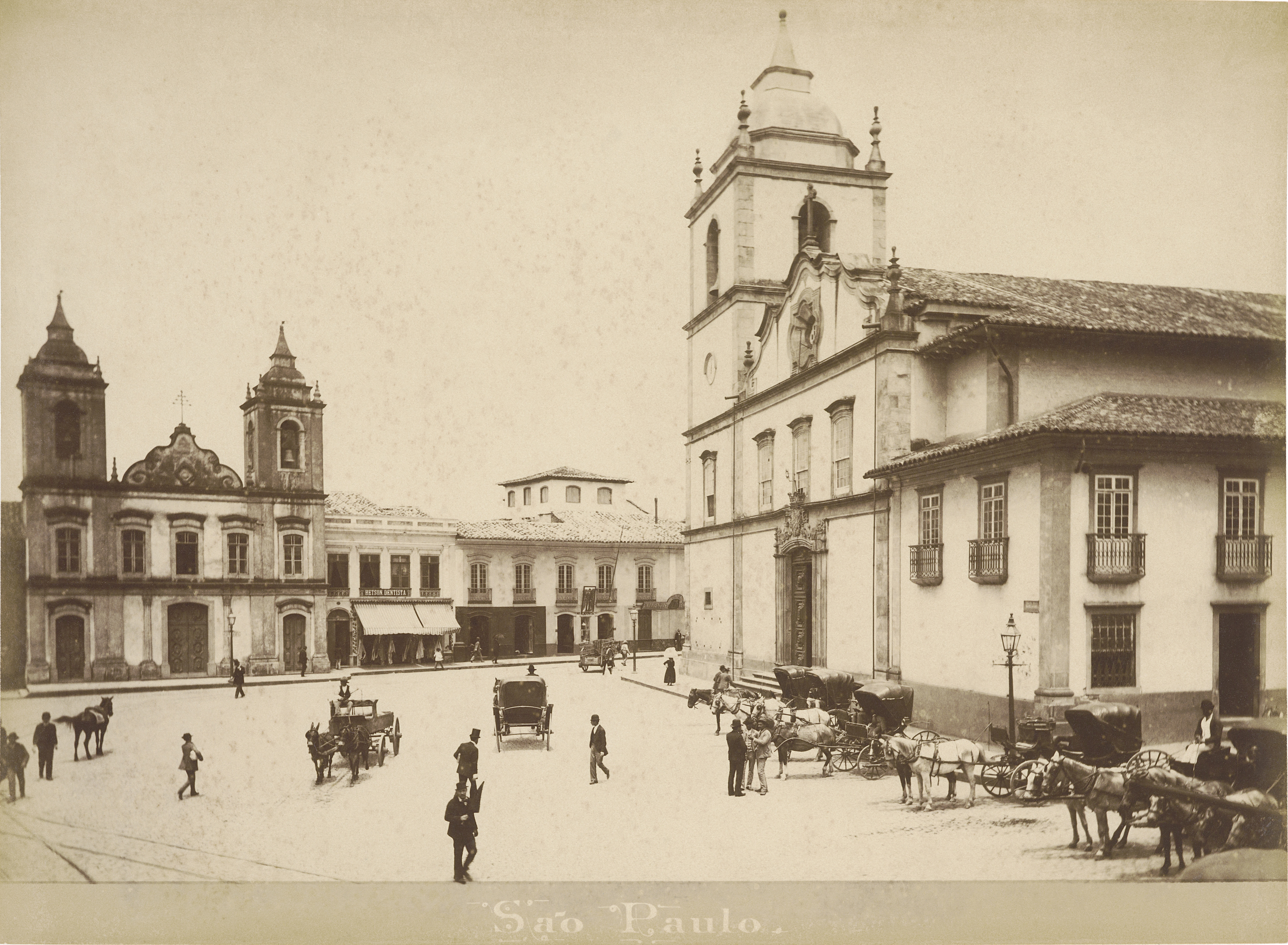
Cathedral square in a photo of 1880 by Marc Ferrez. The old Cathedral of São Paulo is the church to the right.

Originally known as Largo da Sé (Field of the See), the square developed around the religious building which preceded the cathedral and surrounding edifices. At the beginning of the 20th century, older structures were demolished, and the downtown area was reconstructed according to the time's urban planning. Its geography has remained mostly unchanged since.

=== Landscape project ===
The current landscape is the result of a 1970s project by architects led by José Eduardo de Assis Lefèvre. The opening of a nearby São Paulo Metro station required the leveling of an entire city block, requiring an entirely new landscaping infrastructure.

The architects were heavily influenced by contemporary landscaping works underway on the US's west coast (such as those by Lawrence Halprin), characterized by rigorous geometry, through multiple levels with reflecting pools and prism-like land masses.

=== Renovation ===
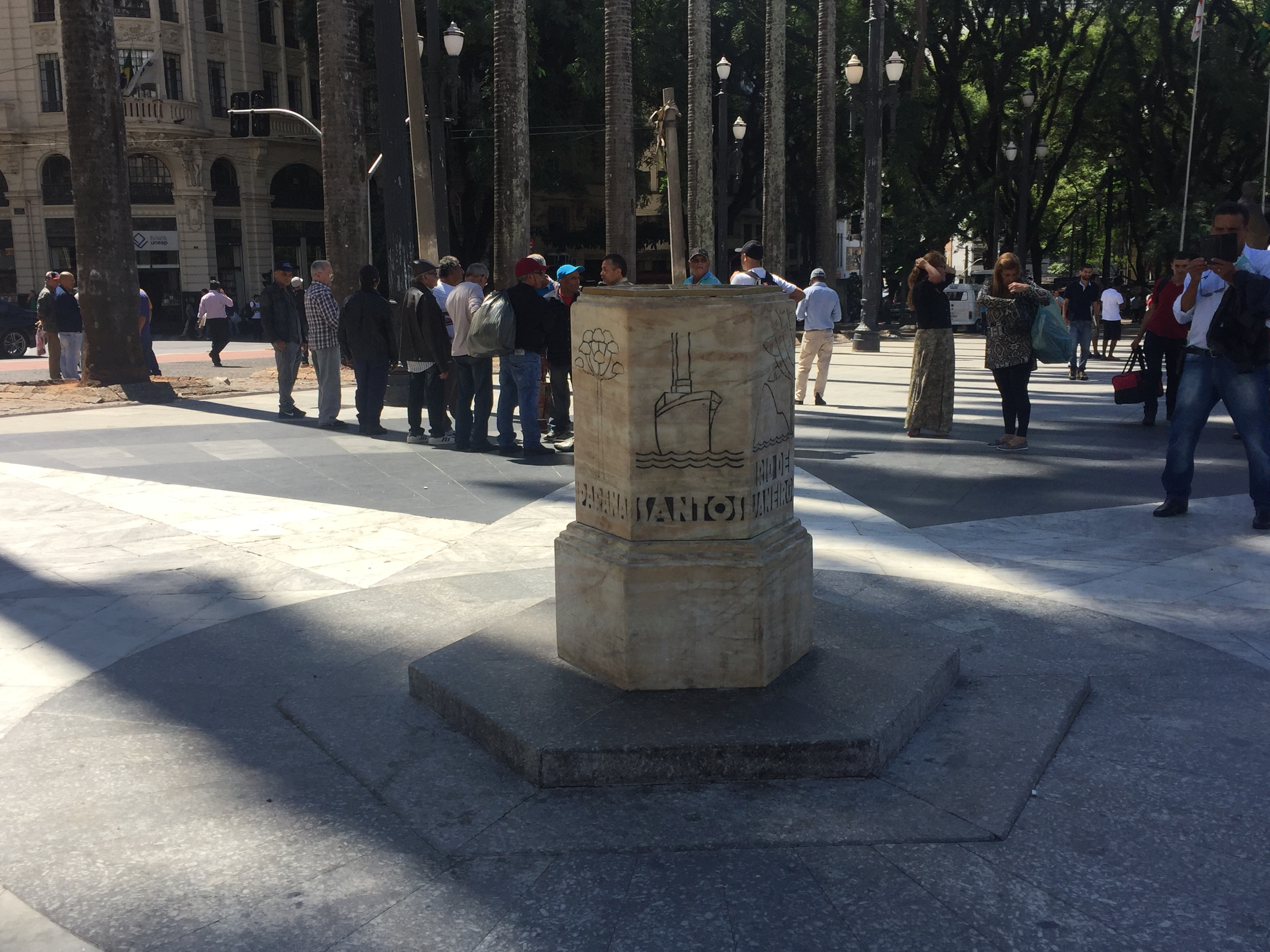
Marco Zero, in the square, is considered the official central point of São Paulo.

The square underwent a significant revitalization during 2006, having been partially re-inaugurated on January 25, 2007 (the city's anniversary) by then-mayor Gilberto Kassab. The renovation came under intense criticism by NGOs working with the homeless who claimed that the new square reduced the space available for existing homeless people

The renovation includes the relocation of flower boxes, the increase in the integration between existing sculptures and their surroundings, and the introduction of pedestrian overpasses over the existing reflecting pools.

== Monuments ==
Image	Name	Creator	Year of creation	Material	Category on Commons	Monument ID	Sculpture ID
	Abertura	Amílcar de Castro	1979	iron	Abertura by Amilcar de Castro		
	Condor	Bruno Giorgi	1979	bronze	Condor by Bruno Giorgi (bronze, 1979)		
	Diálogo	Franz Weissmann	1979	steel	Diálogo by Franz Weissmann		
	Emblem of São Paulo	Rubem Valentim	1979	concrete reinforced concrete	Emblema de São Paulo by Rubem Valentim		
	Espaço Cósmico	Yutaka Toyota	1979	stainless steel granite steel	Espaço Cósmico		
	Garatuja	Marcello Nitsche	1979	zinc iron steel polyurethane	Garatuja		
	Impacto	Mário Cravo		stainless steel granite	Impacto by Mário Cravo		
	José de Anchieta	Heitor Usai	1954	bronze	José de Anchieta by Heitor Usai (bronze, 1954)		
	Number zero survey marker of the city of São Paulo	Jean Gabriel Villin		marble bronze granite	Marco Zero (São Paulo)		
	Nuvem sobre a Cidade	Nicolas Vlavianos	1979	stainless steel steel	Nuvem sobre a Cidade by Nicolas Vlavianos		
	Quadro-Negro	José Resende		concrete iron	Quadro-Negro by José Resende		
	Satélite	Francisco Stockinger		granite concrete	Satélite by Francisco Stockinger (sculpture, 1978)		
	Sé Totem	Doménico Calabrone		granite concrete marble	Totem da Sé		
	Sem título	Sérgio Camargo		marble	Sculpture by Sérgio de Camargo (Praça da Sé)		
	The Birds	Felícia Leirner	1979	bronze granite	Os Pássaros by Felícia Leirner		
	Voo	Caciporé Torres	1979	stainless steel concrete steel	Voo by Caciporé Torres		

== Bibliography ==
- MACEDO, Silvio Soares e ROBBA, Fábio; Praças brasileiras; São Paulo:Edusp; ISBN 85-314-0656-0
