= Renina Katz =

Brazilian engraver

- Born: Renina Katz Pedreira; 30 December 1925; Rio de Janeiro, Brazil
- Died: 21 January 2025 (aged 99); São Paulo, Brazil
- Known for: Lithography, watercolor, engraving

Renina Katz Pedreira (30 December 1925 – 21 January 2025) was a Brazilian engraver, printmaker, and watercolorist. Together with Edith Behring and Fayga Ostrower, she is part of the generation of Brazilian women engravers that art historian Geraldo Edson de Andrade calls the "matriarchy of engraving in Brazil".

== Life and career ==
Katz began her career in the 1940s, primarily painting portraits and landscapes of Rio de Janeiro. In 1946, she started to take woodcutting lessons with the Austrian printmaker Axl Leskoschek .

Between 1947 and 1950, Katz attended college at the Escola Nacional de Belas Artes in Rio de Janeiro, focusing her studies on painting. She went on to get a licentiate degree in drawing from the College of Philosophy of the Federal University of Rio de Janeiro. Persuaded by a friend, the artist Poty Lazzarotto, Katz studied metal engraving with Carlos Oswald at the Rio de Janeiro School of Arts and Crafts. Throughout the 1950s, she continued to work with metal engraving but switched to woodcutting and lithography for most of her career and only returned to engraving in the 1980s.

After moving to São Paulo in 1951, Katz taught painting and print making at the São Paulo Museum of Art from 1952 to 1955, and at the Armando Álvares Penteado Foundation from 1953 to 1963. During this period, from the late 1940s to mid 1950s, she mostly dedicated herself to woodcut and linocut working. She produced figurative prints with a strong social appeal in the style of social realism, portraying marginalized members of the Brazilian population, including migrants, farm workers and slum dwellers.

In the 1960s, Katz adopted a more abstract style which she continued for the rest of her career. She dedicated herself to painting and drawings, embarking on a study of color through serigraph printing. To obtain the desired effects, Katz engraved up to five matrices and applied up to eight different colors to make multiple impressions of a single print. Of this process, she said: "color emerged from the evolution of the work, and the multiplication of the matrices brought the possibility of exploring various tonal values." During the 1970s, Katz started working with lithography, which became her favoured medium.

In 1965, Katz became a professor at the School of Architecture and Urbanism at the University of São Paulo, the same institution where she obtained her master's and doctoral degrees. Her 1979 master thesis was the first scholarly work at the University of São Paulo presented as a series of serigraphs. Similarly, her 1982 doctoral thesis consisting of 13 lithographs was the first non-verbal dissertation presented in her department.

Diminishing health made Katz give up printmaking, shifting her focus to watercolors. "Since engraving demands physical strength, with time it became increasingly hard to work with it", she claimed. Katz died on 21 January 2025, at the age of 99.
