= Serge Attukwei Clottey =

Ghanaian artist (born 1985)

- Born: 1985 (age 40–41); Accra, Ghana
- Education: 2000 – 2004 Ghanatta College of Art and Design, Accra, Ghana; 2006 – 2007 Guignard University of Art of Minas Gerais, Belo Horizonte, Brazil; Honorary Doctorate, University of Brighton, 2019, UK
- Occupation: Artist
- Known for: Afrogallonism

Serge Attukwei Clottey (born 1985) is a Ghanaian artist who works across installation, performance, photography and sculpture. He is the creator of Afrogallonism, an artistic concept, which he describes as "an artistic concept to explore the relationship between the prevalence of the yellow oil gallons in to consumption and necessity in the life of the modern African". As the founder of Ghana's GoLokal, Clottey tries to transform society through art.

He is based at Labadi, a suburb of Accra, Ghana.

== Early life and education ==
Clottey was born in Accra in 1985 and started exhibiting his works around 2003. He was educated at the Ghanatta College of Art and Design in Accra. He then moved to Brazil, where he attended Guignard University of Art of Minas Gerais. In 2019, he received an Honorary Doctorate of Art from the University of Brighton.

== Exhibitions ==
=== Solo exhibitions ===
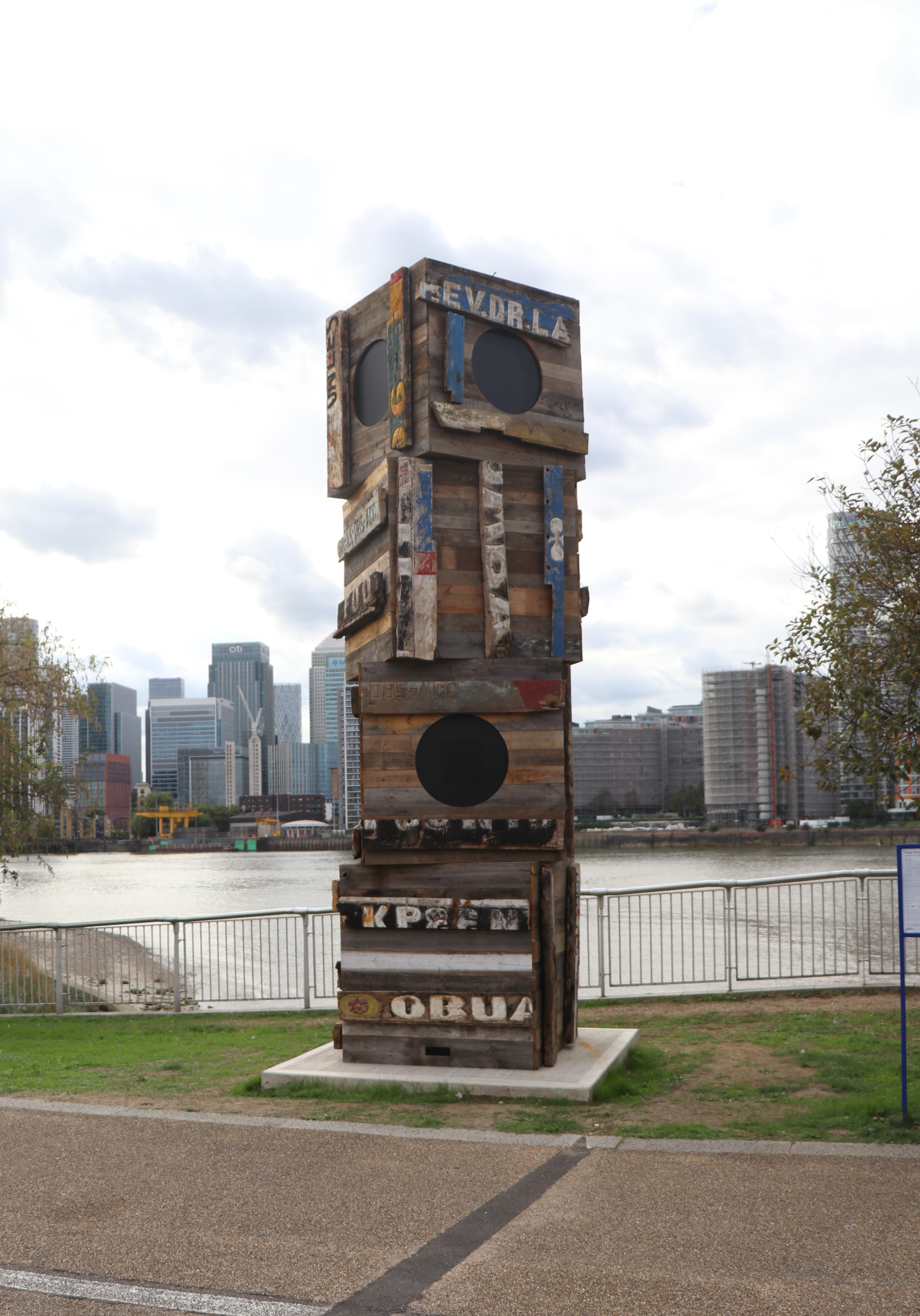
Tribe and Tribulation (2022) sculpture situated at North Greenwich, London

- 2022: Tribe and Tribulation, The Line (art trail), London, UK
- 2022: Erased Past, Brigade, Copenhagen, Denmark
- 2022: Gold Falls, Desert X, AlUla, Saudi Arabia
- 2022: The Bodies Left Behind, Ritz-Carlton South Beach, Miami, FL
- 2021: Distinctive Gestures, Gallery 1957, London, UK
- 2021: Beyond Skin, Simchowitz, Los Angeles, CA
- 2020: Sensitive Balance, GNYP Gallery, Berlin
- 2020: Serge Attukwei Clottey: ADESA WE, Ever Gold [Projects], San Francisco
- 2020: Serge Attukwei Clottey: Routes, The Mistake Room, Los Angeles
- 2019: Serge Attukwei Clottey: Sometime in your Life, Lorenzelli arte, Milano
- 2019: Serge Attukwei Clottey: Solo Chorus, The Mistake Room, Los Angeles
- 2019: Kubatana, Vestfossen Kunstlaboratorium, Oslo
- 2019: Current Affairs, Fabrica, Brighton
- 2018: Everyday Myth: Survival and Sustenance, Ever Gold [Projects], San Francisco
- 2018: 360LA, Accra
- 2018: Differences Between, Jane Lombard Gallery, New York City
- 2018: Gallery Takeover, Lawrie Shabibi Gallery, Dubai
- 2018: The Displaced, Gallery 1957 at Lawrie Shabibi Gallery, Dubai, UAE
- 2017: Gallery 1957 at Cape Town Art Fair, Cape Town, South Africa
- 2017: Gallery 1957 at 1:54 Contemporary African Art Fair, New York, NY
- 2017: Burning in Water w/ Frédéric Bruly Bouabré, New York, NY
- 2016: My Mother's Wardrobe, Gallery 1957, Accra, Ghana
- 2016: Hand to Mouth, Ever Gold [Projects], San Francisco, CA
- 2016: Earthly Conversations, GNYP Gallery, Berlin, Germany
- 2016: Solo presentation w/ Gallery 1957 at 1:54 Contemporary African Art Fair, London, UK
- 2015: The Displaced, Mesler/Feuer, New York, NY
- 2008: Global Warming (Featured Project), British Council, Accra, Ghana
- 2008: Portrait of Accra, Junior Art Club Sponsorship, Bristol, UK

=== Group exhibitions ===
- 2022: The Storytellers, Gallery 1957, London, UK
- 2022 Contemporary African Art, Palm Springs Art Museum, Palm Springs, CA
- 2021: La Condition Publique, Roubaix, France
- 2021: Desert X, Curated by Cesar Garcia and Neville Wakefield, Palm Desert, CA
- 2021: Kugarisana, Simchowitz at Christie’s Beverly Hills, CA
- 2021: Materiality, Iziko South Africa National Gallery, Cape Town, South Africa
- 2020: Radical Revisionists: Contemporary African Artists Confronting Past and Present, Moody Center, Houston
- 2019: Fabrica, Brighton Festival, UK
- 2019: Tradition Interrupted, Bedford Gallery, Walnut Creek, CA
- 2019: Stormy Weather, Museum Arnhem, Arnhem
- 2018: Right at the Equator, Depart Foundation, Malibu
- 2018: Art Los Angeles Contemporary w/ Ever Gold [Projects], Los Angeles, CA
- 2018: Untitled Art Fair, Miami
- 2018: Defying the Narrative: Contemporary Art from West and Southern Africa, Ever Gold [Projects], San Francisco
- 2017: Dans Un Ciel Ensoleille, UTA Artist Space, Los Angeles, CA
- 2017: Atsala Tsala (A Selection of Contemporary African Art), Patricia Low Contemporary, Gstaad, Switzerland
- 2017: Untitled Group Show, Ibid Gallery, Los Angeles, CA
- 2017: Group Show, Blank Projects, Cape Town, South Africa
- 2016: Practical Common Sense, Chale Wote Street Art Festival, Accra, Ghana
- 2015: Spielzeiteröffnung 2015: We Don't Contemporary Festival, Hamburg, Germany
- 2015: What is Matter, Intelligentsia Gallery, Beijing, China
- 2015: The Silence of Ordinary Things, The Mistake Room, Los Angeles, CA
- 2014: Colour Unfinished, 27th Festival Les Instants Vidéo, Marseille, France
- 2014: Migration Messages, Collective Realities of African Migration, Werkstätten-nd Kulturhaus, Vienna, Austria
- 2014: Global Art Local View, European Monument Day, Mohr- Villa, Münich, Germany
- 2014: MULTIPOINT, The International Art Symposium, Nitra, Slovakia
- 2014: African Contemporary Photography, The Auction Room & Ozwald Boateng, London, UK
- 2014: 4 Masked/Unmasked, DAK’ART - 11th Biennale de l’Art Africain Contemporain, Dakar, Senegal
- 2014: ‘Colour Unfinished, Du Bois In Our Time II,’ University of Amherst
- 2014: Nubuke Foundation and the Du Bois Centre, Accra, Ghana
- 2013: Muses, Goethe Institut, Accra, Ghana
- 2013: Art Speaks, Werkstätten-und Kulturhaus, Vienna, Austria
- 2013: Inside The Mosquito Net, Alliance Française, Accra, Ghana
- 2013: We Are Africa, Nubuke Foundation, Accra, Ghana
- 2012: Time, Trade & Travel, Stedeljik Museum, Amsterdam, Denmark
- 2012: The Beautiful Ones Are Not Yet Born, Goethe Institut, Accra, Ghana
- 2012: Alternative Independence Day Celebration, Freedom Tour, Nubuke Foundation, Accra, Ghana
- 2012: Inside The Mosquito Net, Brazil House, Jamestown, Ghana
- 2011: Cultures in Confluence, Alliance Française & Goethe Institut, Accra, Ghana
- 2011: Trash To Treasure, Alliance Française & Goethe Institut, Accra, Ghana
- 2011: Climate Change, Caspar House, Accra, Ghana
- 2009: Africa Show, African Contemporary Art, Naples, Italy
- 2008: Untying the Human Spirit, CAN 2008, Goethe Institut, Accra, Ghana

== Recognition ==
In August 2019, Clottey received the award of honorary Doctorate of Arts from the University of Brighton.
