= Marco Zero (São Paulo) =

Geographic monument in São Paulo, Brazil

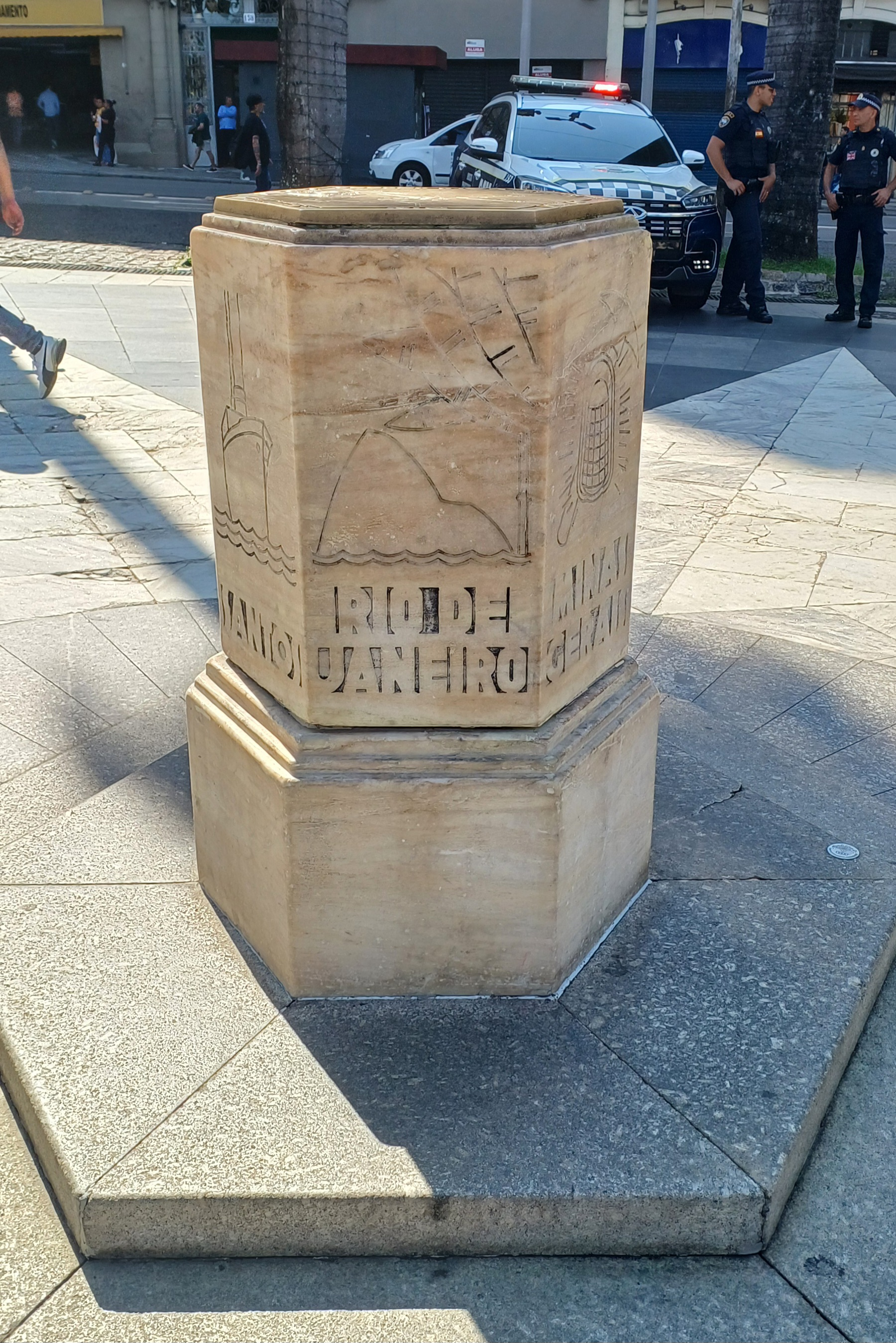
- Marco Zero, Praça da Sé
- Interactive map of Marco Zero
- Location: São Paulo, Brazil
- Coordinates: 23°33′01″S 46°38′02″W
- Designer: Jean Gabriel Villin
- Type: milestone
- Material: marble, bronze, granite
- Length: 70 centimetres (28 in)
- Width: 70 centimetres (28 in)
- Height: 113 centimetres (44 in)
- Opening date: 1934

Marco Zero (Zero Milestone) is a geographic monument in downtown São Paulo. In 1934, the marble milestone was installed in front of the São Paulo Cathedral on the Praça da Sé to symbolize the center of the city. The sculpture is a both a tourist attraction and a central point of reference for street numbers in the city. Marco Zero has been registered for historic preservation since 2007.

== History ==
Originally proposed by journalist Américo Netto in 1921, the project to mark an official center of the city with a monument was not adopted until 1932 by mayor Antônio Carlos de Assumpção. Prior to this period, streets and highways were numbered based on at least three different marcos zero scattered around São Paulo. Netto wrote his ideas in the Estado de São Paulo newspaper and Boas Estradas magazine (where he was an editor) complaining of the confusion that this decentralized approach caused. Four months prior to the inauguration of Marco Zero, Netto compared this new monument to both the Zero Milestone in Washington, D.C., and to the Milliarium Aureum (golden milestone) in ancient Rome.

Since it was installed in 1934, Marco Zero on the Praça da Sé has remained the official spot from which roads, highways, rail lines, and telephone lines are marked.

== Features ==
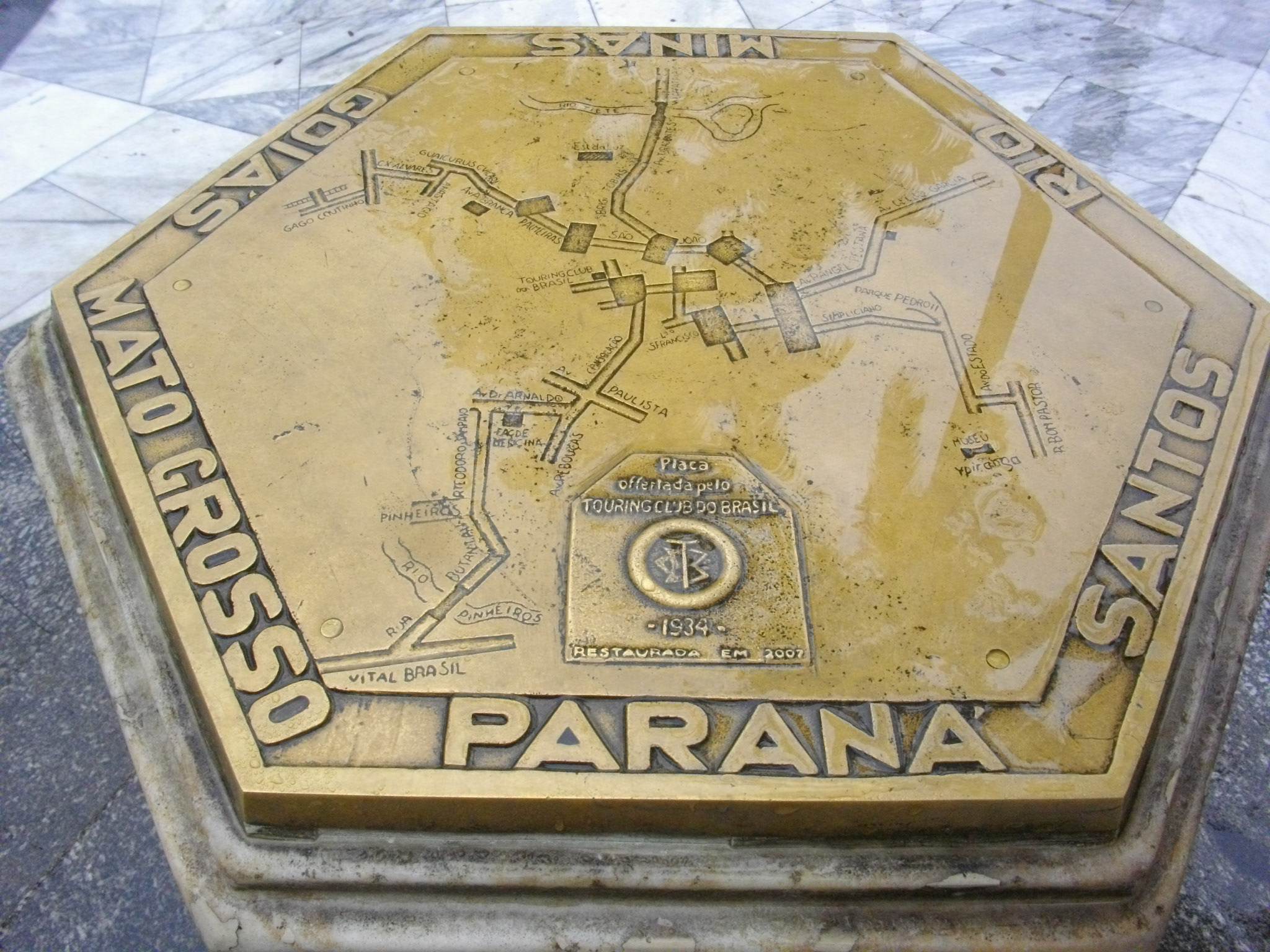
Top of the monument

Marco Zero was designed by Jean Gabriel Villin, based on ideas from Américo Netto. It is a carved hexagonal marble structure on a granite pedestal with a bronze plate on the top. Each side of the monument is decorated with the name of the city or state which it faces. For example, the side facing northeast has the words "Rio de Janeiro" along with an outline of the Pão de Açucar. The other sides are marked with Goiás, Santos, Minas Gerais, Paraná, and Mato Grosso, along with iconic images for each. On the bronze top, the names are repeated along the sides and in the center is a map of the city of São Paulo with important landmarks and roads leading out of the city. These engravings include: Avenida Paulista, Tietê River, and Luz Station.

== Preservation ==
In 2007 Marco Zero was registered as a protected monument by the Municipal Council for the Preservation of Historical, Cultural, and Environmental Patrimony of the City of São Paulo (Conpresp). Three similar stone monuments, marking the outer edges of the city, all dating to 1916, were registered by Conpresp in June 2013. These markers are located in the districts of Butantã, Vila Mariana, and Ipiranga.
