= Amílcar de Castro =

Brazilian sculptor, graphic designer, and artist (1920–2002)

- Born: Amílcar Augusto Pereira de Castro; 6 June 1920; Paraisópolis, Minas Gerais, Brazil
- Died: 21 November 2002 (aged 82); Belo Horizonte, Brazil
- Other name: Amílcar Ferreira de Castro
- Occupations: Artist sculptor graphic designer
- Years active: 1950s–2002
- Known for: Iron Sculptures
- Spouse: Dorcilia Caldeira Castro
- Children: 3

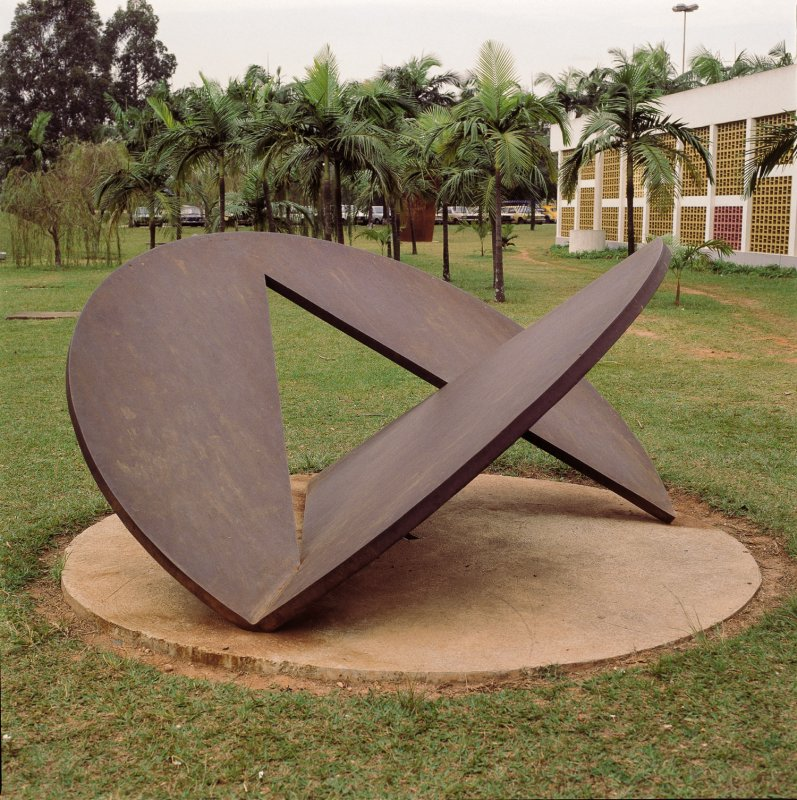
Sculpture by de Castro in the garden of the Museu de Arte Contemporaneo, University of São Paulo

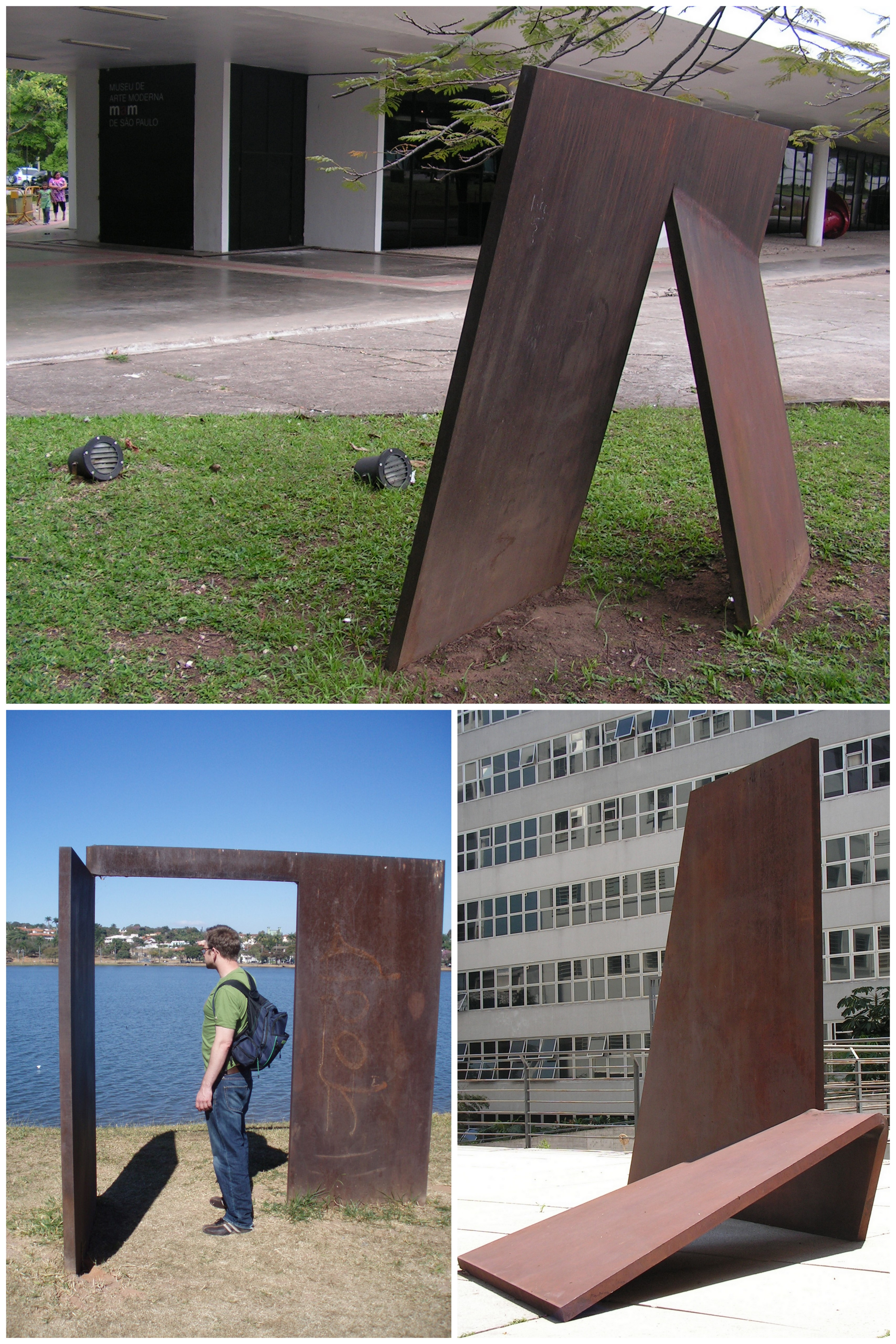
Various sculptures by de Castro in (clockwise from top) Ibirapuera Park, São Paulo; Unknown location, São Paulo; Pampulha, Belo Horizonte

Amílcar Augusto Pereira de Castro (6 June 1920 – 21 November 2002) was a Brazilian artist, sculptor and graphic designer.

== Early life and education ==
Born in Paraisópolis, Minas Gerais, Brazil Amilcar de Castro was the child of a judge and the oldest of seven children. Having moved to Belo Horizonte in 1934 he graduated in law from the Federal University of Minas Gerais (UFMG) in 1945. He frequented the Escola Guignard from 1944 to 1950 where he studied design with Alberto Guignard and figurative sculpture with Franz Weissman.

== Career ==
Moving to Rio de Janeiro in 1953 de Castro began his career as a graphic designer with the magazines "Manchete" and "A Cigarra." He carried out the graphic redesign of the Jornal do Brasil newspaper in 1957–1959. In the sixties, though he was increasingly artistically more focused on sculpture, he undertook graphic design for several other Brazilian newspapers as well as working as a book designer for the publisher Editora Vozes.

From the late 1950s he focused on sculpture and was one of the leading figures of the Brazilian Neo-Concrete Movement. He participated in exhibitions with this group in Rio de Janeiro and São Paulo, in 1956. In 1959 he was one the signatories of the Neo-Concrete Manifesto alongside Ferreira Gullar, Franz Weissmann, Lygia Clark, Lygia Pape, Reynaldo Jardim, and Theon Spanudis which was published on 22 of March 1959 in Jornal do Brazil.

After receiving a grant from the Guggenheim Foundation and the "Foreign Travel" prize at the 15th National Salon for Modern Art in 1957 he travelled to the United States, basing himself in New Jersey. In 1971 he returned to Belo Horizonte dedicating himself to artistic and educational activities. He directed the Escola Guignard Foundation from 1974 to 1977 where he taught "bidimensional and tridimensional expression." He was Professor of Sculpture at the UFMG School of Fine Arts from 1979 to 1990 and of Sculpture at the Art Foundation of Ouro Preto-FAOP in 1979. One of his students was Shirley Paes Leme.

== Output ==
De Castro is particularly famous for large, bold simple iron forms nearly always characterized by a design based on "one cut, one fold." His method can be linked both to his earlier work with graphic design and paper, and to the mining heritage of his home state of Minas Gerais.

De Castro did not just produce steel sculptures, he also used wood, marble and glass. Reflecting his training under Alberto Guignard and his work as a graphic designer, he also produced thousands of graphic works, drawings prints and large scale paintings, as well as objects and jewelry.

== Personal life ==
De Castro was married to Dorcilia Caldeira Castro. They had three children. He died in Belo Horizonte, Brazil on 21 November 2002.

== Selected works ==
- Untitled at the Museum of Modern Art, 1960
