= Fayga Ostrower =

Engraver, printmaker and painter (1920–2001)

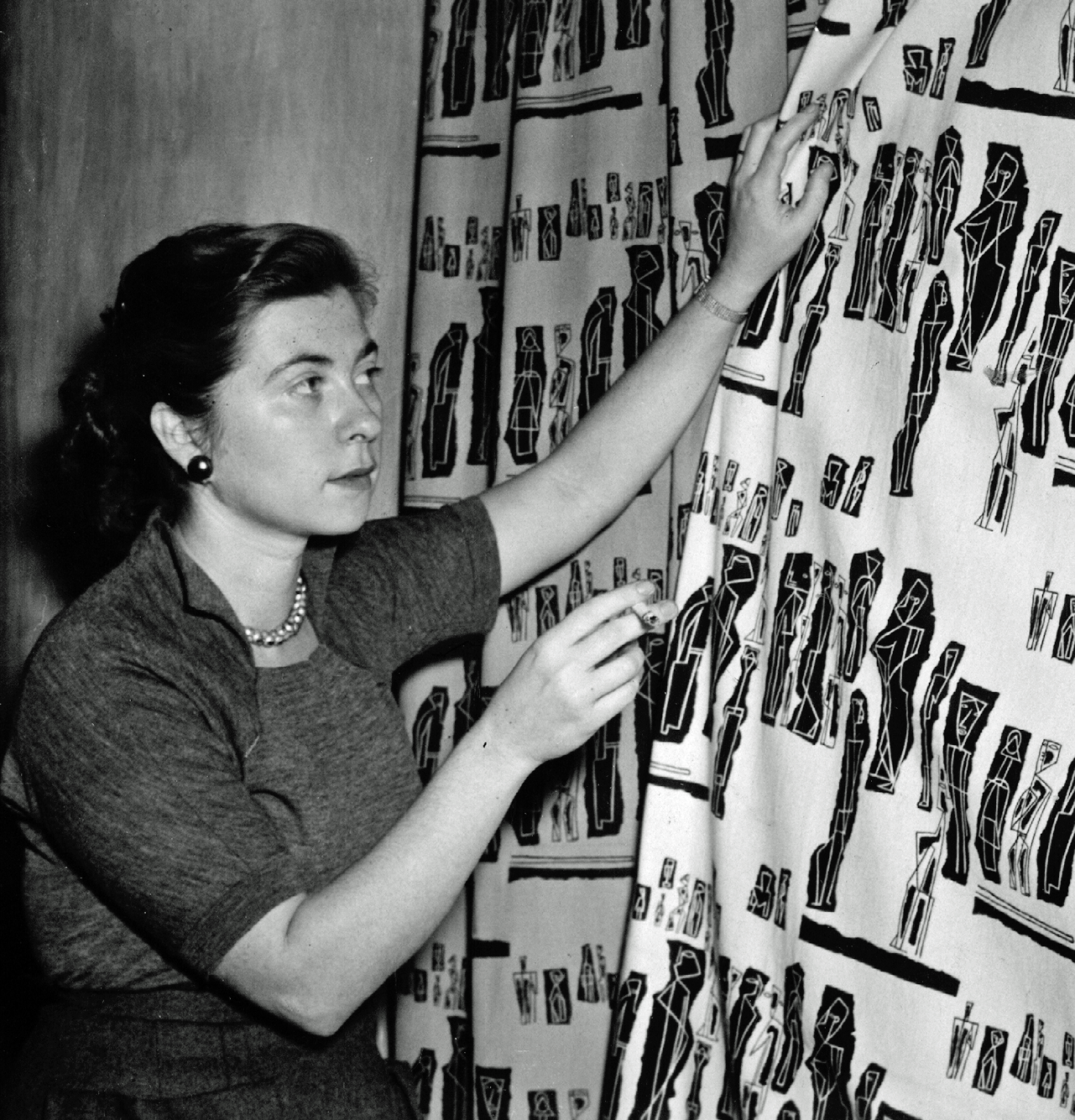
- Fayga Ostrower (1956)
- Born: Fayga Perla Krakowski; 14 September 1920; Łódź, Poland
- Died: 13 September 2001 (aged 80); Rio de Janeiro, Brazil
- Education: Getúlio Vargas Foundation
- Known for: Engraving, printing, painting, illustration
- Movement: Abstract expressionism
- Spouse: Heinz Ostrower (m. 1941; died 1992)

Fayga Perla Ostrower (née Krakowski; 14 September 1920, Łódź — 13 September 2001, Rio de Janeiro) was a Polish-Brazilian engraver, painter, designer, illustrator, art theorist and university professor.

== Biography ==
Fayga Ostrower was born Fayga Perla Krakowski to a Jewish family at Łódź. In 1921, the family moved to Elberfeld and Barmen in Germany, where Ostrower attended primary and secondary schools. In the early 1930s, following difficulties with the German authorities, the family sought refuge in Belgium, and emigrated to Brazil in 1934, where they took up residence in Nilópolis. Ostrower began work as a secretary while studying art at the Fine Arts Association, and in 1946 attended design classes at the Getúlio Vargas Foundation’s Brazilian Society of Fine and Graphic Arts, where she studied metal and wood engraving, and art history, with tutors Axel Leskoschek, Tomás Santa Rosa, Carlos Oswald, and Anna Levy. In 1955, she spent a year in New York through a Fulbright Scholarship, engraving under the tutelage of Stanley Hayter.

Ostrower exhibited and won prizes in the international Art Biennials of São Paulo (1951 to 1967), Venice (1958 and 1962) and Mexico (1960).

In 2002, the Fayga Ostrower Institute was founded in Rio de Janeiro in memory of Ostrower, to house her works and documents, and to provide for creative, fine art and interdisciplinary study.

== Family ==
In 1941, Fayga married Marxist activist Heinz Ostrower, both becoming naturalized in 1951. They had a son Carl Robert (b. 1949), and daughter Anna Leonor (b. 1952).

== Teaching ==
Between 1954 and 1970, Ostrower lectured in Composition and Critical Analysis at the Museum of Modern Art, Rio de Janeiro. In the 1960s she taught at the Slade School of Fine Art, London, and in 1964 at Spelman College, Atlanta. Subsequently, she held posts within postgraduate programmes within various Brazilian universities. Consecutively she developed art courses for workers and community centres, and gave lectures at various cultural institutions.

== Legacy ==
In 2023, her work was included in the exhibition Action, Gesture, Paint: Women Artists and Global Abstraction 1940-1970 at the Whitechapel Gallery in London.

== Selected exhibitions ==
=== Joint ===
- 1951 to 1967 – São Paulo Biennial
- 1957 – Modern Art in Brazil (Buenos Aires, Rosário, Santiago, Lima)
- 1958 and 1962 – Venice Biennial
- 1960 – Mexico Biennial
- 1960 – Certame Latin American Engraving Exhibition, Buenos Aires
- 1965 – Contemporary Brazilian Art (London, Vienna, Bonn)
- 1965 – Contemporary Brazilian Engravers (Cornell University)
- 2012 – Centro Cultural Rio de Janeiro: Diálogos

=== Solo ===
- 1955 – Pan-American Union, Washington
- 1957 – San Francisco Fine Arts Museum
- 1959 – Stedelijk Museum, Amsterdam
- 1960 – Art Institute of Chicago
- 2011–12 – Museu Lasar Segall, São Paulo

=== Collections ===
- Museum of Contemporary Art, University of São Paulo
- Institute of Contemporary Arts, London
- Victoria and Albert Museum, London
- Albertina Museum, Vienna
- Museum of Modern Art, New York
- Fine Arts Museum, Philadelphia
- Library of Congress, Washington
- Art Institute of Chicago
- Fayga Ostrower Institute, Rio de Janeiro
- Museu de Arte Moderna, Lodz

== Organisational involvement ==
- 1963 to 1966 – President of the Associação Brasileira de Artes Plásticas (Brazilian Association of Arts)
- 1978 to 1988 – Director of the Brazilian committee of Unesco's International Society of Education Through Art (INSEA)
- Honorary Member of the Academy of Art and Design, Florence
- 1982 to 1988 – member of the Conselho Estadual de Cultura (Cultural Board of Rio de Janeiro State)

== Honours ==
- 1972 – Order of Rio Branco Award
- 1998 – Order of Cultural Merit (Brazil)
- 1999 – Grande Prêmio de Artes Plásticas (Grand National Art Prize – Ministério da Cultura do Brasil)

== Bibliography ==
- Ostrower, Fayga (1983); Universos da arte; Editora Campus, Rio de Janeiro. ISBN 8570011121
- Ostrower, Fayga (1990); Acasos e criacao artistic; Editora Campus, Rio de Janeiro. ISBN 8570015992
- Puerto, Cecilia (1996); Latin American Women Artists, Kahlo and Look Who Else:, pp. 1407–8; Greenwood Press. ISBN 0313289344
