= Guignard University of Art of Minas Gerais =

Fine arts school in Belo Horizonte, Brazil

- Escola Guignard
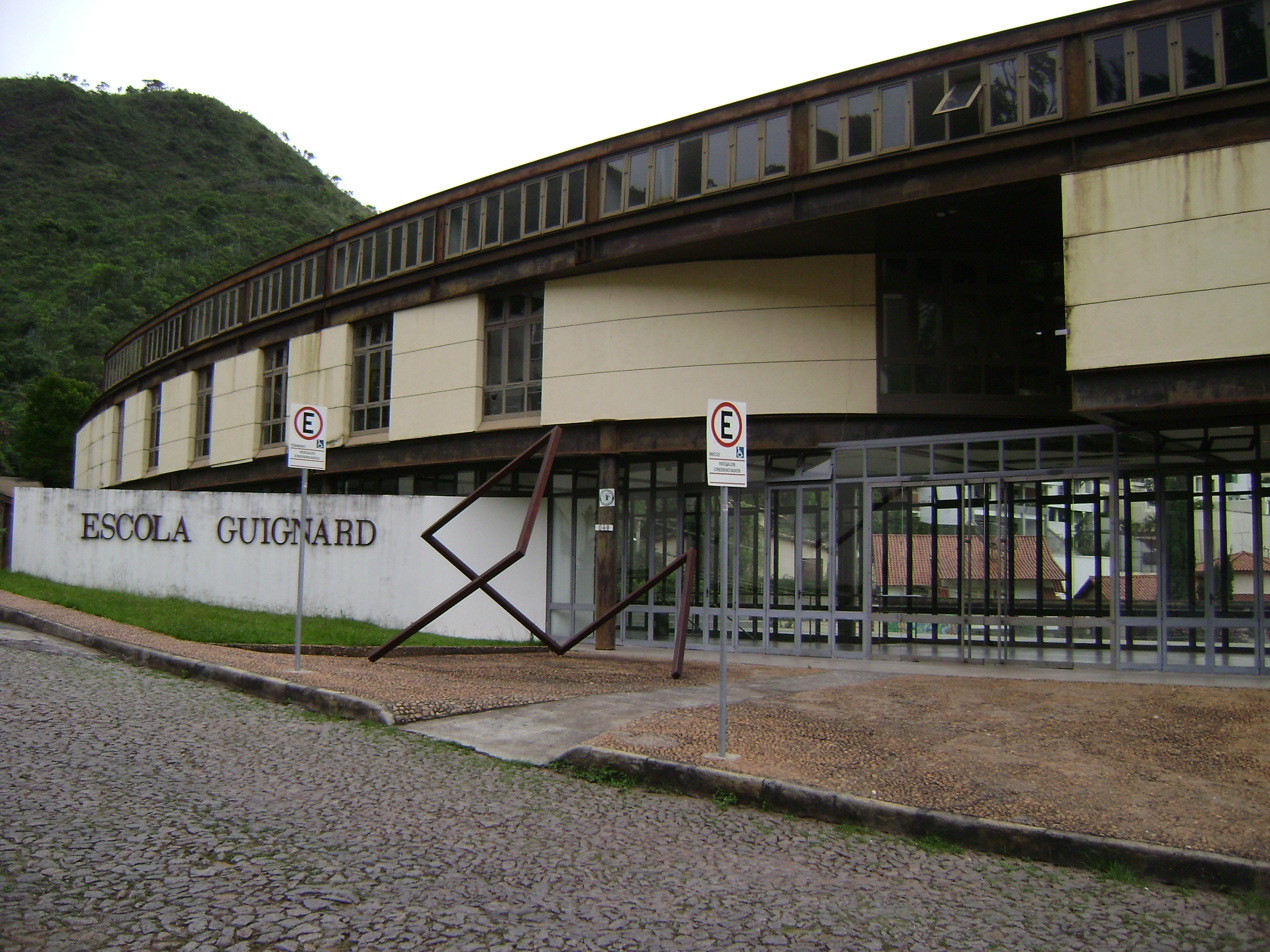
- Guignard University of Art of Minas Gerais
- Established: 1994
- Parent institution: Universidade do Estado de Minas Gerais
- Affiliations: Minas Gerais
- Location: Belo Horizonte, Minas Gerais, Brazil; 19.955187°S 43.920228°W
- Website: www.uemg.br

The Guignard University of Art of Minas Gerais (Portuguese: Escola Guignard) is a university of fine arts in Belo Horizonte, Minas Gerais, Brazil. It was founded on 28 February 1944 by the Brazilian painter Alberto da Veiga Guignard (1896-1962) on request of Juscelino Kubitschek, mayor of Belo Horizonte and later President of Brazil. Guignard became a noted arts educator in Brazil and remained a professor at Guignard for the remainder of his life.

The school is noted for its unorthodox administration and educational methods: students and teachers work together freely, and the school lacks the bureaucracy typical of other Brazilian educational institutions. Guignard offers two degrees: a degree in art education and bachelor's degree in fine arts.

== History ==
The university traces its origin to Guignard's Escola de Belas-Artes, founded in 1943. It merge with the Department of Architecture of the Institute of Fine Arts of Belo Horizonte in 1944 to form the Escola Guignard. The period from 1944 to 1962 are regarded as the "golden age" of the school: it remained under Guignard's direction, and largely away from political and administrative problems of Brazil of the period. Guignard also benefited from its proximity to the Pampulha Project of the Brazilian architect Oscar Niemeyer (1907-2012), a series of modernist buildings constructed in Minas Gerais in the early 1940s.

Under the new constitution of the state of Minas Gerais of 1989 the school became part of the Universidade do Estado de Minas Gerais. The architect Gustavo Penna, a native of Minas Gerais, designed the current distinctive buildings of the school in the early 1990s, and completed the works by 1994.

== Notable students ==
Guignard is noted for training numerous Brazilian artists like Maria Helena Andrés (born 1922), Amilcar de Castro (1920–2002), Mary Vieira (1927–2001), Franz Weissmann (1911–2005), and Artur Silva (born 1976). Also, foreign artists received formative training at Guignard, such as the Ghanaian artist Serge Attukwei Clottey. In recent years, alumni Luana Vitra has gained significant recognition for her work.
