= Teresa Nicolao =

Brazilian artist

Teresa Nicolao (born February 8, 1928) is a Brazilian artist, designer and film maker.

She was born Maria Tereza Joaquim Nicolao in Rio de Janeiro. Nicalao studied graphic arts and design with Axel Leskoscheck at the Fundação Getúlio Vargas. In 1949, she went to Paris, where she studied with Fernand Léger, André Lhote, Maria Helena Vieira da Silva and Árpád Szenes. Later the following year, she moved to São Paulo, where she worked as a set designer for Multifilmes. In 1954, Nicolao returned to Rio de Janeiro, where she resumed painting, working in the studio of Candido Portinari. She began painting geometric works inspired by the favelas; her later work became more abstract. She also worked on set design for several films.

Nicolao participated in the 1957 São Paulo Art Biennial, the 1958 Bienal Interamericana de Pintura y Grabado in Mexico City, the 1960 Venice Biennale and the 1961 Biennale de Paris. She was included in an exhibition of works by Brazilian artists which was presented in several cities in Europe in 1960. in In 1961, she had a solo exhibition at the Museum of Modern Art, Rio de Janeiro.
