= Gilvan Samico =

Brazilian painter, teacher and engraver

- Born: June 15, 1928; Recife, Brazil
- Died: November 25, 2013 (aged 85)
- Education: Escola Nacional de Belas Artes
- Known for: Paintings, engravings
- Style: Fantastical
- Movement: Armorial Movement
- Website: Official website (2016 archive)

Gilvan Samico (June 15, 1928 – November 25, 2013) was a Brazilian painter, teacher and engraver of the Armorial Movement of graphic design.

== Art movement ==
Born in Recife, Brazil in 1928, he was an exponent of the Brazilian figurative modernism developed in the Northeast of Brazil and an icon of the "Armorial Movement" (movimento armorial), which sought to create a Brazilian art constructed from the sum of the heritage of popular culture and archaic themes of European colonization. His art is filled with fantastic animals, mythical scenes arising from legends and indigenous stories, whose archetypal expression refers to a universal work. It is strongly rooted in the popular northeastern Brazilian culture expressed by Cordel, art made in small books written in verses and illustrated by woodcuts representing a major regional tradition.

== Studies and exhibits ==
Samico studied woodcut engraving with Lívio Abramo at the Museu de Arte Moderna de Sâo Paulo in 1957 and printmaking with Oswaldo Goeldi at Escola Nacional de Belas Artes. He made more than hundred art works and around 300 individual and collective exhibitions in Brazil and beyond, and was awarded by the 31st Venice Biennale and three times by the Museu de Arte Moderna do Rio de Janeiro. Some of his works are included in the collection of the New York MoMa. In the book Samico, the author Weydson Barros Leal tells that to improve his technique, Samico also developed innovative gadgets and tools like the gouge, an instrument that does not allow the wood grain to roll and ink drawing, while the surface of the plate is cut. Away from the major urban centers, he spent his last decades in a house from the seventeenth century in the historic city of Olinda. He died in 2013 and his work has been the subject of multiple exhibitions and tributes in Brazil since then. It was part of the retrospective of 10 years of the Mercosul Biennial and was featured by the 32nd Bienal de São Paulo.
