= Barbara Wagner & Benjamin de Burca =

Visual artist duo

Bárbara Wagner & Benjamin de Burca
- Born: 1980; 1975; Brasília, Brazil; Munich, Germany
- Known for: Visual Arts, Filmmaking, Photography
- Website: wagnerdeburca.com

Bárbara Wagner & Benjamin de Burca (born in 1980, Brasília, Brazil; and 1975, Munich, Germany) are a visual art duo working primarily in filmmaking, video installation, and photography. Their films often involve the collaboration of non-actors for scripted dance performances and screenwriting.

Bárbara Wagner & Benjamin de Burca's video installation Swinguerra was commissioned by and presented in the Brazilian Pavilion at the 58th Venice Biennale in 2019. Their films are featured in collections in Brazil, the United States, and Europe.

Bárbara Wagner graduated from the Dutch Art Institute in Arnhem, the Netherlands in 2012.

== Work ==
Bárbara Wagner & Benjamin de Burca started collaborating in 2011 in the creation of videos, photographic series, and installations about regional and culturally specific dance movements and contemporary music genres across geographies in Brazil and beyond. Their image-making process combines fictional and documental moving image characteristics with elements of popular culture such as video clip aesthetics and ethnographic investigations on race, social class, gender, and language.

Wagner and de Burca have had solo presentations of their work in international art events and exhibitions including a mid-career retrospective Five Times Brazil (2022) at the New Museum, New York, United States; a commission for Brazilian Pavilion at the 58th Venice Biennale, Italy; a solo show at the Institute of Contemporary Art, Boston, United States; a commission for the 2019 Toronto Biennial, Canada; the Front International 2018, Cleveland Triennial for Contemporary Art, Cleveland, United States; a first solo show in the United States at the Pérez Art Museum in Miami; and presentations at the 32th São Paulo Biennial; and the Museum of Art of São Paulo in São Paulo, Brazil (2022), among others.

The artist duo have participated in numerous film and photography festival including CONTACT Photography Festival; Berlinale, Germany (2017, 2018, 2019); the Biennial VideoBrasil, São Paulo; the Locarno Film Festival (2019), and the International Documentary Film Festival in Tel Aviv, Israel (2017).

== Filmography ==
=== Faz que vai (Set to go), 2015 ===
Set to go depicts frevo dancers, drag queens among them, in Recife, Northeast region in Brazil, that challenge gender roles and cultural expectations to expand on contemporary society's relationship with this traditional musical movement and genre.

=== Estás vendo coisas (You Are Seeing Things), 2017 ===
You Are Seeing Things is centered around two main characters, the firefighter Dayana, and the hairdresser Porck. The film highlights the techno Brega both as a new musical genre and cultural scene while the story develops.

=== Terremoto Santo (Holy Tremor), 2017 ===
Holy Tremor comments on economic community empowerment through labor and belief systems. The story takes place in a Pentecostal evangelical church in Pernambuco state and showcases gospel singers to expand on class struggles in a postcolonial world.

=== Rise, 2018 ===
In Rise, writers, poets, and musicians from the collective R.I.S.E. (Reaching Intelligent Souls Everywhere) perform and congregate in the underground cultural scene of Toronto. The non-actors in Rise are first and second-generation youth immigrants from the Caribbean diaspora.

=== Swinguerra, 2019 ===
Swinguerra, a two-channel video installation commissioned for the Brazilian Pavilion at the 58th Venice Biennale, Italy, brings to life a dance dispute between two rival dance groups and sheds a light on queer people of color in Recife, particularly the transgender and nonbinary communities. Swinguerra takes its title from a combination of two words “swingueira” (a slang and regional dance style) and “guerra” (which means “war” in both Portuguese and Spanish languages). The film was first presented in the United States at the ICA, Boston and has been exhibited in venues worldwide such as the Maison Europeenne de la Photographie, the Contemporary Dayton, and Sao Paulo Biennial, among others.

=== Fala da Terra (Voice of the Earth), 2022 ===
Voice of the Earth pays homage to the work of Coletivo Benzeiros, the theater and drama group within the Brazilian Landless Workers’ Movement (MST), in the state of Pará. The film narrative explores the need for cooperation and collaboration between farmers and workers in the care for the environment and food safety. The film also celebrates the life and work of Brazilian playwright August Boal and German poet Bertolt Brecht.

== Notable artworks in collections (selection) ==
- Estás vendo coisas (You Are Seeing Things), 2016. Pérez Art Museum Miami, United States; and Kadist, Paris, France, and San Francisco, United States
- Swinguerra, 2019. Institute of Contemporary Art, Boston, United States
