= Madalena dos Santos Reinbolt =

- Born: September 14, 1912; Vitória da Conquista, Bahia, Brazil
- Died: 1976 (aged 63–64); Petrópolis, RJ, Brazil
- Known for: Painting and tapestry
- Style: Naïve art

Maria Madalena Santos Reinbolt (September 14, 1912 – 1976) was a Brazilian self-taught painter and textile artist who created "paintings with paint" and "paintings with wool" that depicted rural scenes reminiscent of the artist's childhood in Bahia. She is considered to be a naïf or primitive artist.

== Early life ==
Reinbolt was born one of 16 children in a farm in Vitória da Conquista, Bahia, on September 14, 1912. Her father was a farmer and her mother, Ana Maria de Souza Pereira, was a farmhand and a craft worker that mainly occupied herself by threading cotton, creating pottery dishes and pots, fabricating lace, and making butter. Madalena was never formally educated, and did not learn how to read, besides signing her own name.

In her early 20s, Reinbolt moved to Salvador to work as a maid. In 1945, she moved to Rio de Janeiro, where she spent two years working as a maid before moving to São Paulo, in 1947. She moved back to Rio de Janeiro soon after, and finally settled in Petrópolis, in 1949, where she would work as the cook for Lota de Macedo Soares and Elizabeth Bishop at Samambaia, Soares' family estate.

Reinbolt was fired from her position as cook of Samambaia in late 1952 for spending too much time painting. According to Elizabeth Bishop, "it finally got to be a choice between art and peace, and tranquility seemed more important than a masterpiece every afternoon." After she got fired, Reinbolt continued to paint, and sold some of her works to Soares' friends.

In 1952, she married Luiz Augusto Reinbolt, the groundskeeper at Samambaia.

Madalena Santos Reinbolt died in Petrópolis in 1976.

== Works ==
Reinbolt started expressing herself creatively as a child by painting old newspapers and making collages out of leaves and feathers. Soon after, she started to draw, paint, and embroider freehand.

As a maid in Salvador, she embroidered dish cloths with designs drawn by her employer. In São Paulo, her employer would refer to Reinbolt as an artist and would incentivize her to pursue a career in the arts.

Reinbolt's first known paintings are from the early 1950s. According to Elizabeth Bishop, Reinbolt started painting on rocks and garbage pails while Bishop and Soares were out of town, and was incentivized by Lota de Macedo Soares to continue her artistic endeavors. According to Reinbolt, Soares gave her brushes, oil paints, and paper after finding an album of drawings she made after moving away from Rio de Janeiro that depicted the city's landscapes and landmarks like Sugarloaf Mountain and Christ the Redeemer.

From 1950 up to 1963, Reinbolt worked with oil on paper. After that, she started working exclusively on canvas. Her paintings were made in an expressionistic or gestural style, with quick and long brushstrokes.

In the late 1960s, Madalena Santos Reinbolt transitioned from painting into embroidery, using yarn on burlap. Reinbolt referred to these large-scale, multicolored tapestries as "wool paintings," since they continued to reflect her gestural style, with thread instead of paint. She kept multiple colored threads at hand, working with up to 154 needles at a time. Her tapestries depicted agropastoral themes similar to the ones she experienced growing up in rural Bahia, with animals, trees, and boiaderos.

== Exhibits ==
Reinbolt's work has been exhibited at the Venice Biennale after her death. Her paintings and tapestries are currently featured in public and private collections, like the Museu Afro Brasil and the Museu de Arte de São Paulo Assis Chateaubriand - MASP, both in São Paulo, Brazil.
