= Edith Behring =

Brazilian artist and educator

- Born: 1916; Rio de Janeiro
- Died: 1996 (aged 79–80); Rio de Janeiro
- Education: Universidade do Distrito Federal

Edith Behring (January 17, 1916 – January 25, 1996) was a Brazilian artist and educator.

== Life ==
Behring was born in Rio de Janeiro. Behring studied drawing and painting with Candido Portinari. She went on to earn a degree in art education from the Universidade do Distrito Federal. From 1944 to 1950, she lived in Belo Horizonte, teaching drawing at the Escola Guignard there. She returned to Rio de Janeiro, where she studied with Axl Leskoschek and Carlos Oswald at the Fundação Getúlio Vargas. In 1953, Behring was awarded a scholarship to study painting in Paris. However, soon afterwards, she decided to pursue studies in metal engraving instead. She studied with Flávio Shiró, João Luís Chaves and Mário Carneiro. In 1955, Behring held her first solo exhibition at the Galerie Saint Placide in Paris. She returned to Brazil in 1957 and was invited to teach at the Instituto de Belas Artes do Rio de Janeiro (later the Escola de Artes Visuais do Parque Lage). In 1959, she is said to have set up the engraving studio at the Museum of Modern Art, Rio de Janeiro, although another source credits Johnny Friedlander.

Behring had solo exhibitions in Brazil, Peru, Argentina, Paris and Rome. In 1963, she was invited to exhibit at the Bienal Americana de Gravura in Santiago. From 1957 to 1967, she participated in the São Paulo Art Biennial. In 1980, Behring was given an award for best individual exhibition by the Associação Paulista de Críticos de Arte. In 1983, the Galeria de Arte Banerj in Rio de Janeiro held a retrospective of her work.

Behring died in Rio de Janeiro at the age of 80.
