= Diane Lima =

Independent curator, writer, and researcher

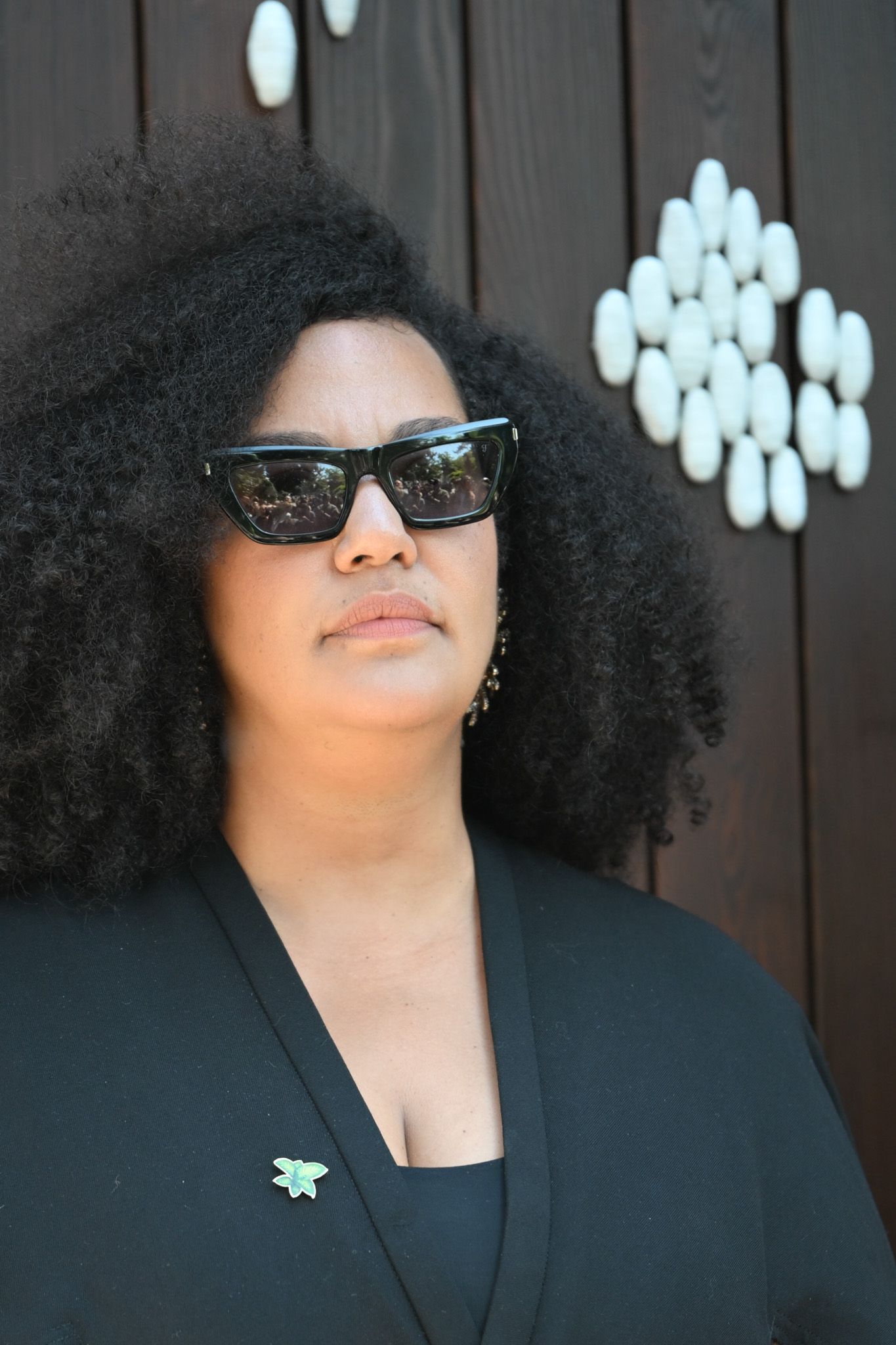
- Born: Diane Sousa da Silva Lima; 1986 (age 39–40); Mundo Novo, Brazil
- Occupations: Independent curator, writer, researcher

Diane Sousa da Silva Lima (born 1986) is a Brazilian independent curator, writer, and researcher based in São Paulo and Salvador, Brazil. As an Afro-Brazilian feminist voice, Lima challenges hierarchical paradigms in contemporary art, pushing for artistic production that is anticolonial and antiracist.Through her work, Lima has amplified discussions about the absence of Afro-Brazilian production in artistic spaces, including the visual arts, music, theater, cinema, literature, and dance.

== Early life and education ==
Diane Sousa da Silva Lima was born in Mundo Novo, Bahia, Brazil, in 1986. Lima’s work and values were strongly influenced by her upbringing. The daughter of a woman named Danúsia, who was both a unionist and a banker and who took on the roles of mother and father, Lima grew up surrounded by female figures in an environment where conversations about the Black movement and the women’s movement were ever-present.

Lima earned her bachelor’s degree in social communication from the College of the City of Salvador (Faculdade da Cidade do Salvador) in 2008, going on to receive her master's degree in communication and semiotics from Pontifical Catholic University (PUC) in São Paulo in 2017. During her studies of art history in the College of the City of Salvador, Lima dedicated herself to curatorial work.

== Career ==
In 2014, she created NoBrasil (InBrazil), a platform for research and curatorial experiments. In 2015, Lima designed and produced AfroTranscendence (or Afro-T), an immersion program formed by creative processes born from Afro-Brazilian culture. This project seeks to create dialogues around ancestral knowledge, memories, and identity through artistic experiences, lectures, and workshops.

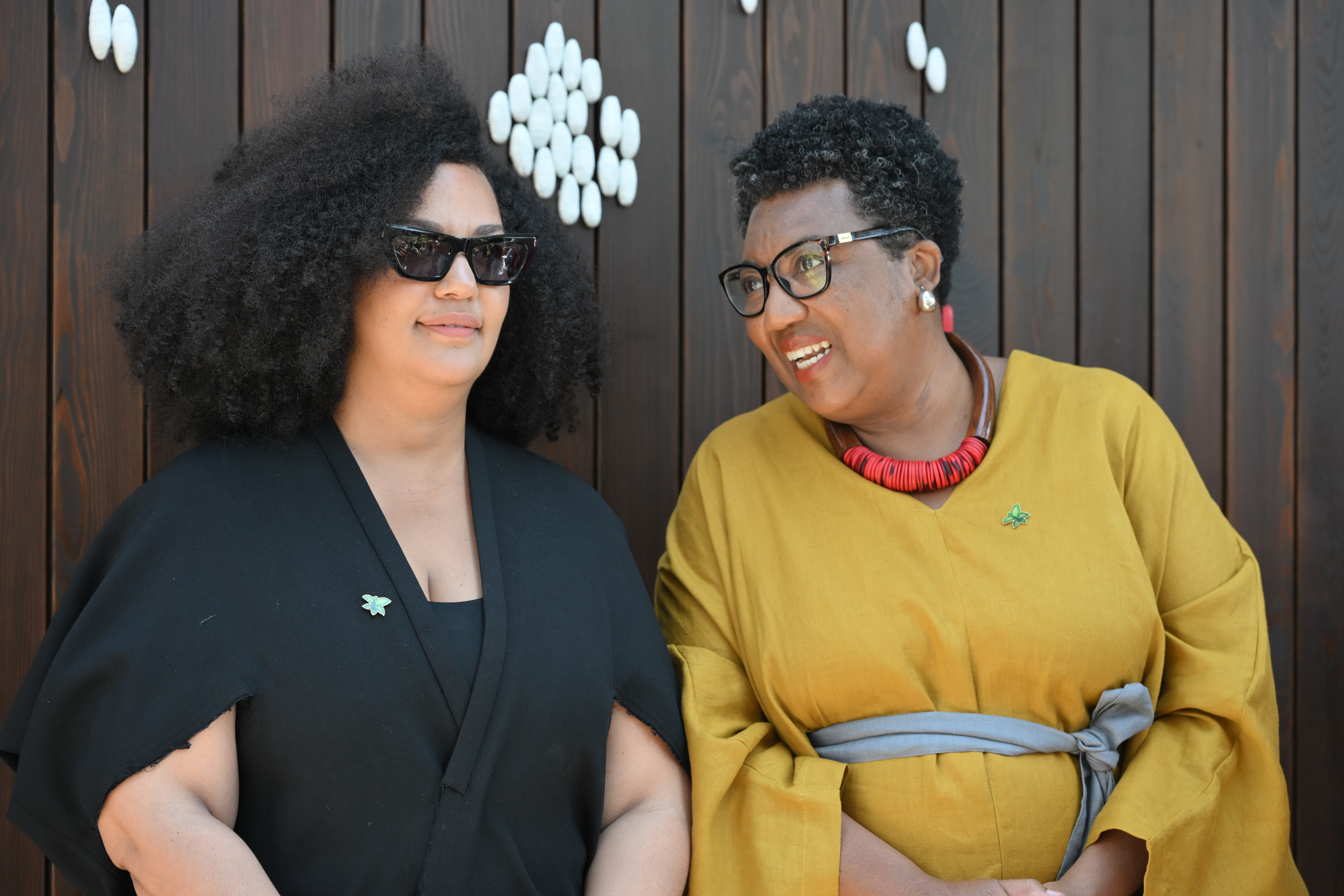
Lima and Rosana Paulino at the Biennale di Venezia in 2026

Between 2016 and 2017, Lima co-curated with Rosana Paulino Diálogos Ausentes (Absent Dialogues), an exhibition and forum sponsored by Itaú Cultural to showcase the work of Black artists and discuss Afro-Brazilian identity and representation in contemporary art. The event brought together artists from different fields of the visual arts to consider the institutional invisibility imposed on Afro-Brazilian culture.

In 2018, Lima participated in the Valongo Festival Internacional da Imagem (Valongo International Image Festival), in São Paulo, where she presented a collective exhibition called Não me aguarde na retina (Don’t wait for me in the retina). Featuring predominantly women, the exhibition explored the forgotten ruins of the seaport region of Santos, São Paulo. Also in 2018, Lima took part in the residency program for curatorial investigation promoted by the independent platform, FelipaManuela, along with the creation center Matadero, in Madrid, Spain. In 2019, Lima collaborated with choreographer Mário Lopes during the PlusAfrot residency program in Munich, Germany. This residency focused on questions related to colonial trauma, displacement, and identity re-signification as they pertain to the lives of Black individuals.
