= Iran do Espirito Santo =

== Biography ==
Iran do Espirito Santo (born 1963 in Mococa, Brazil), is a Brazilian artist, based in São Paulo. He received his Bachelor of Arts degree in 1986 from the Fundação Armando Alvares Penteado in São Paulo.

His work is included in the collection of the Museum of Modern Art in New York. He has exhibited at the Venice Biennale and the Bienal de São Paulo, as well as the Museum of Modern Art in San Francisco, the Museum of Contemporary Art in San Diego, and the Istanbul Biennal.

Iran do Espirito Santo is well known for his minimalist sculptures that have a "meditative tranquility". His work takes common industrial objects and places them into a new domain of "ethereal purity" by using materials such as glass, stainless steel, plaster and stone. His works manipulate real space and life.

== Artistic Development ==
As a child, Espirito Santo gained experience in photography laboratories, where he worked with photo paper and the ways in which light affected and manipulated it. The shades of grey that he worked with during this time helped him to experiment with different aspects of light, and also allowed him to develop his future minimalistic color palettes. As time progressed, he began to utilize light-bearing objects in his works, such as lanterns and candles.

Iran do Espirito Santo gained popularity in the 1990s, when contemporary Latin-American art started to gain traction. His art is reminiscent of the Concrete Art movement of the 1950s in Brazil and other countries in Latin America.

Iran do Espirito Santo’s influence came from modernist Brazilian architecture. More specifically, the industrial and grey aspects of architecture in São Paulo helped to shape his color palettes. Minimalism from outside of Brazil also guided his works. Iran do Espirito Santo’s works lean toward constructivism; he strays away from only expressing himself through his art. His works shy away from representing the human body and human senses, and rather focuses on organizational and geometric phenomena.

His works may be considered to follow Constructive Geometry frameworks. The Constructivism movement was re-conceptualized in the later 1980s by artists such as Iran do Espirito Santo, but veered away from exaggerated or punk aesthetics. His work followed a more minimalistic approach that began to pick up internationally. Oftentimes, his pieces aim to explore the abstract yet faultless states of real-life objects that are often overlooked in day-to-day life.
