= Shaunt'e Lewis =

American visual artist

- Born: January 9, 1985 (age 41); Springfield, Massachusetts, US
- Education: Ivy Tech Community College
- Known for: murals and visual arts

Shaunt'e Lewis (born January 9, 1985) is an Indianapolis, Indiana - based illustrator, designer, and visual artist. In 2022, Lewis received the Nickle Plate Arts "2022 Artist of the Year" Award. Lewis has created artwork for Indy 500, NCAA, Meijer, Jiffy Lube, and Benjamin Harrison Presidential Site, among others. In 2021, her artwork was featured in a New York Times article about works created for March Madness in Indianapolis.

== Life ==
Lewis was born and raised in Springfield, Massachusetts. She moved to Indianapolis, Indiana in 2011. After high school, she attended cosmetology school and worked full-time as a hairstylist. After moving to Indianapolis she attended Ivy Tech Community College of Indiana where she received a degree in general studies. Lewis is married and the mother of four children. During the Covid-19 pandemic, Lewis was forced to close her two salons for several months and in 2021, she decided to permanently close both salons and began working as an artist full-time.

Shaunt'e Lewis' artwork is colorful with bold lines and involves themes of self-identity, black culture, and female empowerment and representation.

== Work ==
- For the Love of the Game: Live, Love, Ball!, 2021, mural, Swish Indy March Madness Public Art Installation in Lugar Plaza, 200 E. Washington St. Indianapolis, IN.
  - Inspired by Bilqis Abdul-Qaadir, the first woman to wear hijab while playing top-level college basketball at Indiana State University.
- Hope, 2022, Jiffy Lube Mural Design, 4950 S. Emerson Ave, Indianapolis, IN.
- "No "Compact of Silence"" Black Civil Rights Advocates in the Harrison Era, 2022, Benjamin Harrison Presidential Site
- Primary Lady, 2021, mural at 8825 Zionsville Road, Indianapolis, IN (Near Rock Hampton Court).
- Sisters in the City 'Mask Up', 2020, digital illustration for #maskupindy, Indianapolis, Indiana
