= Regina Vater =

Brazilian-born American visual artist (born 1943)

- Born: 1943 (age 82–83); Rio de Janeiro, Brazil
- Education: BA Architecture, School of Architecture, Universidade Federal do Rio de Janeiro, Brazil, 1964
- Known for: Photography, video art, multimedia art, visual poetry

Regina Vater is a Brazilian-born American visual artist best known for her installation artwork inspired by Brazilian and African-Brazilian mythologies. In the 1960s, she designed the first album cover for the Tropicália movement, a Brazilian art movement associated with the Brazilian musicians Caetano Veloso and Gilberto Gil. In 1970, she had her first installation, "Magi(o)cean". She has conducted numerous interviews with John Cage, including a video interview that eventually became a part of her film Controverse. She moved to New York in the 1970s, and in 1979 she curated "the first and most comprehensive Brazilian avant-garde exhibit in the city at that time." In 1980, she was awarded a Guggenheim Fellowship. She lived in Austin, Texas with her husband, video installation artist and professor Bill Lundberg, until 2011, when they both moved to Rio de Janeiro, Brazil. Vater's work is known for its feminist themes and questions regarding culture and identity.

== Exhibitions ==
=== Group exhibitions ===
- Biennale des Jeunes, Paris, France (1967)
- Venice Biennale, Venice, Italy (1976)
- São Paulo Biennial, Brazil (1969, 1976)
- Texas Triennial (1988)
- P.S.1 Museum, New York, US (1989)
- Transcontinental: Nine Latin American Artists, Birmingham, England (1990)
- Koninklijk National Royal Museum, Antwerp, The Netherlands (1992)
- Brazilian Visual Poetry, Mexic-Arte Museum, Austin, US (2002)

== Permanent collections ==
(Source: Artspace)

- National Library of France, Paris, France
- The Museum of Modern Art of Rio de Janeiro, Rio de Janeiro, Brazil
- The Museum of Modern Art of São Paulo, São Paulo, Brazil
- The Nelson A. Rockefeller Center for Latin American Art, San Antonio, Texas
- The Blanton Museum of the University of Texas, Austin, Texas
- The Ruth and Marvin Sackner Visual Poetry Archives, Miami, Florida
