= Museu Lasar Segall =

Museum in São Paulo, Brazil

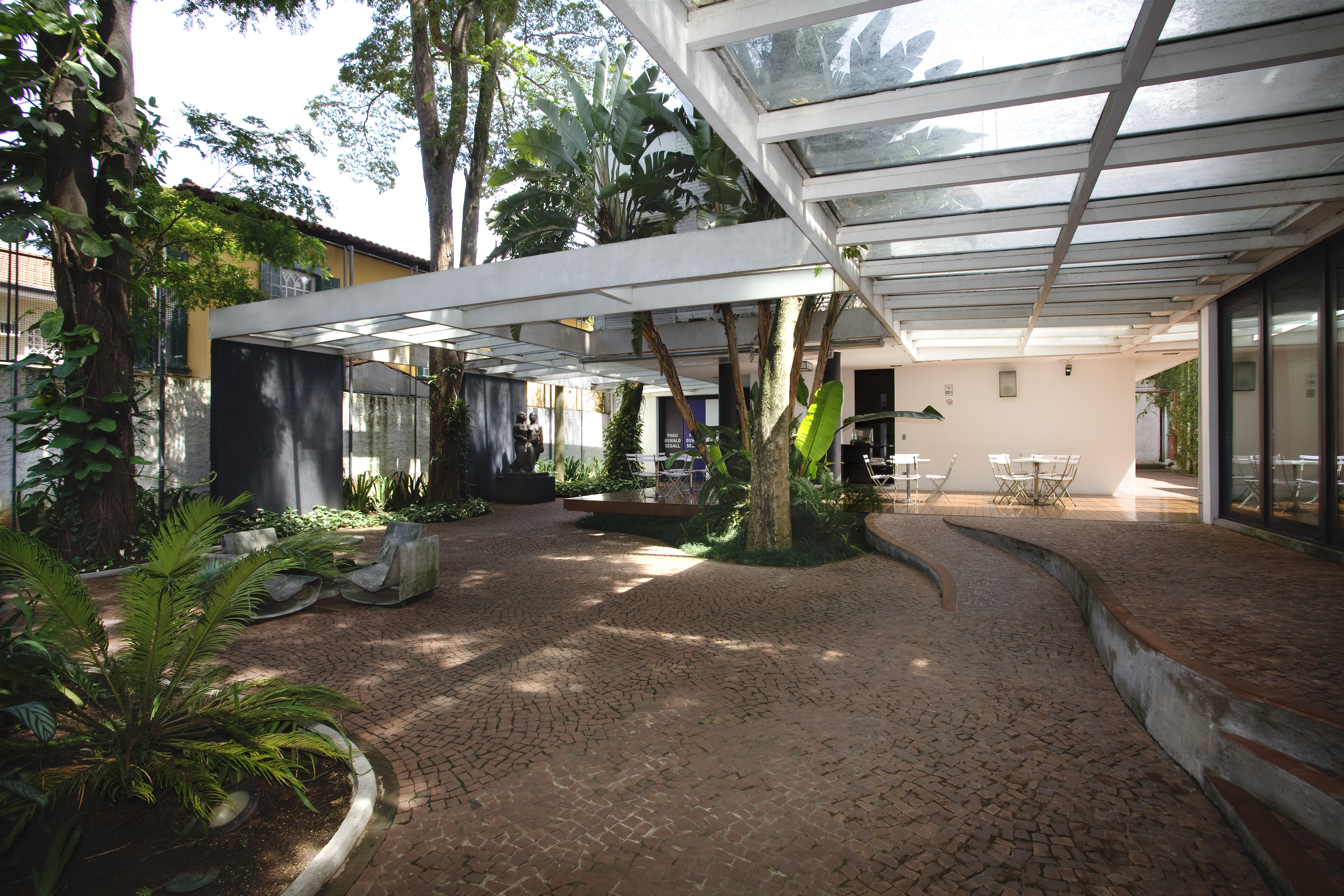
- Established: 1967
- Location: São Paulo, Brazil
- Coordinates: 23.5947°S 46.6356°W
- Public transit access: Santa Cruz
- Website: www.mls.gov.br

Museu Lasar Segall (in English: Lasar Segall Museum) is an art museum in São Paulo, Brazil.

Designed in 1932 by architect Gregori Warchavchik, the building which houses the museum was the residence and art studio of Lithuanian Brazilian artist Lasar Segall until his death in 1957. Segall's family opened the museum in 1967 to showcase the work of the artist. The collection contains more than 3,000 items by Lasar Segall, including paintings, sculpture, drawings, and prints.

Museu Lasar Segall is located at 111 Rua Berta in the Vila Mariana district of São Paulo and is operated by a non-profit foundation.

== See also ==
- History of the Jews in Brazil
