= Alberto da Veiga Guignard =

Brazilian painter

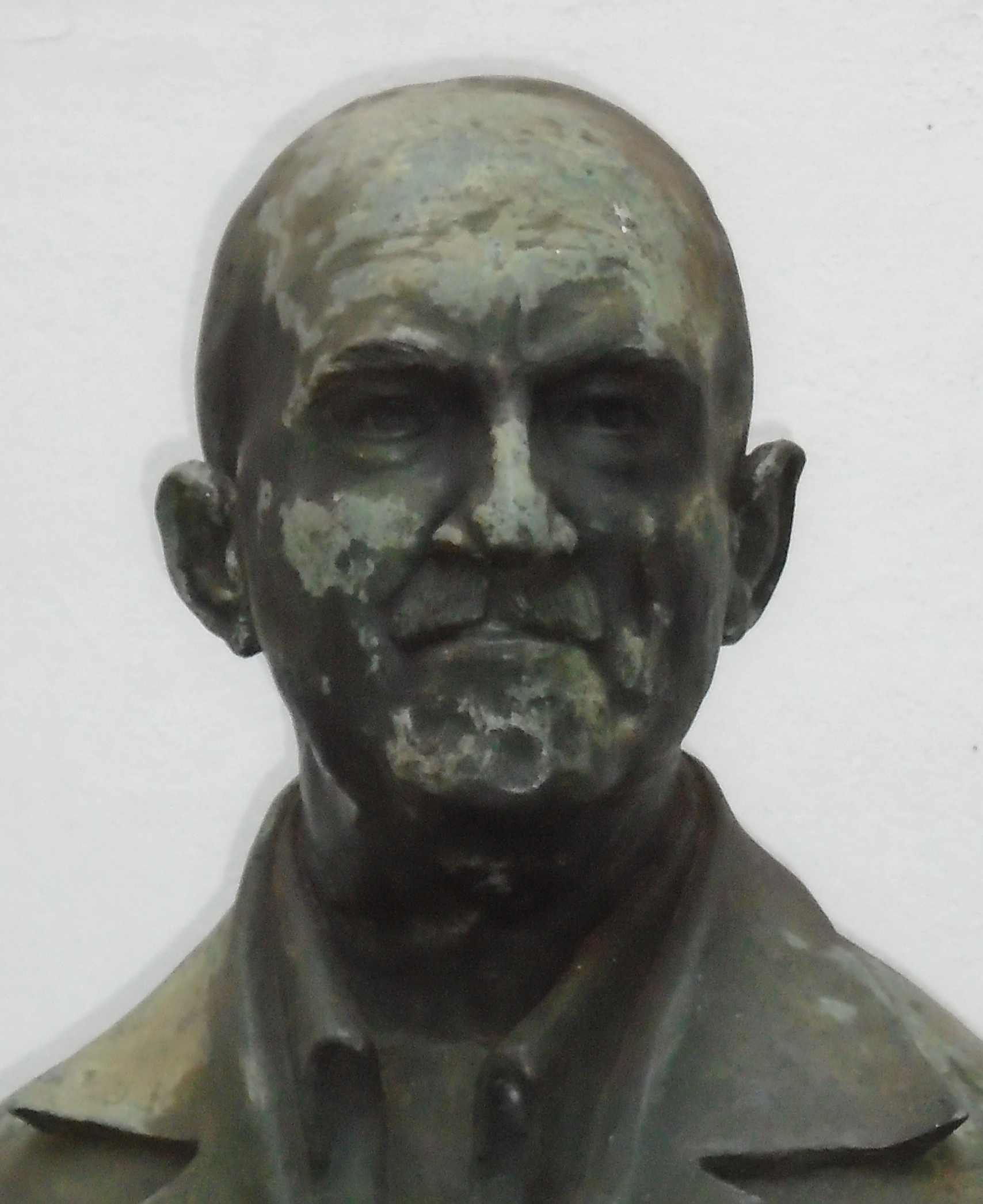
- Bust of Alberto Guignard at Escola Guignard, Belo Horizonte
- Born: February 25, 1896; Nova Friburgo, Rio de Janeiro, Brazil
- Died: June 25, 1962 (aged 66); Belo Horizonte, Minas Gerais, Brazil
- Known for: Painting, drawing, education
- Notable work: Ouro Preto landscape series
- Movement: Modernism / Post-Impressionism
- Patrons: Juscelino Kubitschek

Alberto da Veiga Guignard also known as Alberto Guignard or Guignard (25 February 1896 — 25 June 1962) was a Brazilian painter who became renowned for his depictions of the landscapes of Minas Gerais.

He is the Patron of the 50th chair of the Brazilian Academy of Fine Arts.

Guignard was born in Nova Friburgo in the state of Rio de Janeiro. He was born with a cleft lip and palate. Guignard's father died when he was a child. His mother remarried and moved with Alberto to Germany to be with her new husband Louis von Schilgen, a baron.

In Europe, Guignard began studying painting at the age of 11 and continued his studies for the next 22 years. He attended the Academy of Fine Arts in Munich, where he studied with Herman Groeber and Adolf Engeler and visited Florence.

After he returned to Brazil in 1929, he became an examplar of Brazilian Modernist painting alongside Candido Portinari, Ismael Nery and Cícero Dias.

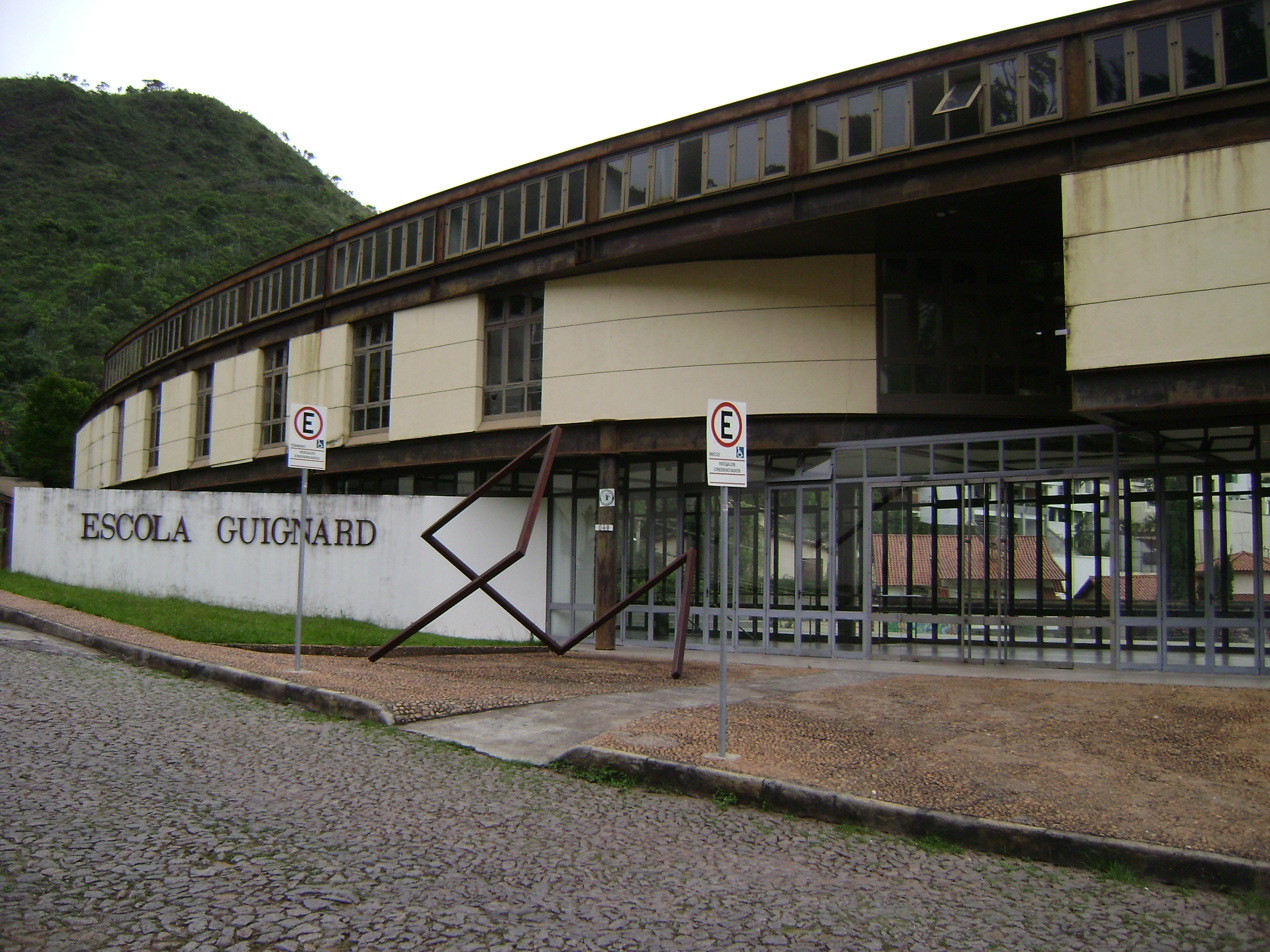
Escola Guignard (in Belo Horizonte), which bears his name

In 1931 he took part in the group exhibition Salão Revolucionário (Revolutionary Salon) at the Escola Nacional de Belas Artes in Rio de Janeiro, the first of its annual exhibitions to host modernists.

He became a mentor to painters such as Iberê Camargo, Vera Mindlin and Alcides da Rocha Miranda. In 1944, Guignard was invited by Juscelino Kubitschek, then mayor of Belo Horizonte, to establish a program for drawing and painting at the newly created Instituto de Belas Artes (now the Guignard University of Art of Minas Gerais). He lived in Belo Horizonte until his death in 1962.

Guignard had several exhibitions in Brazil. In 1953, he was honored with a retrospective in the Museu de Arte Moderna do Rio de Janeiro and, in 1992, at the Museu Lasar Segall.

His body was entombed in the Church of São Francisco de Assis in Ouro Preto.

== Record sale ==
In August 2015, his painting Vaso de Flores was sold for R$5.7 million, becoming the most expensive work of art by a Brazilian artist ever auctioned.
