= Franz Weissmann =

Brazilian sculptor

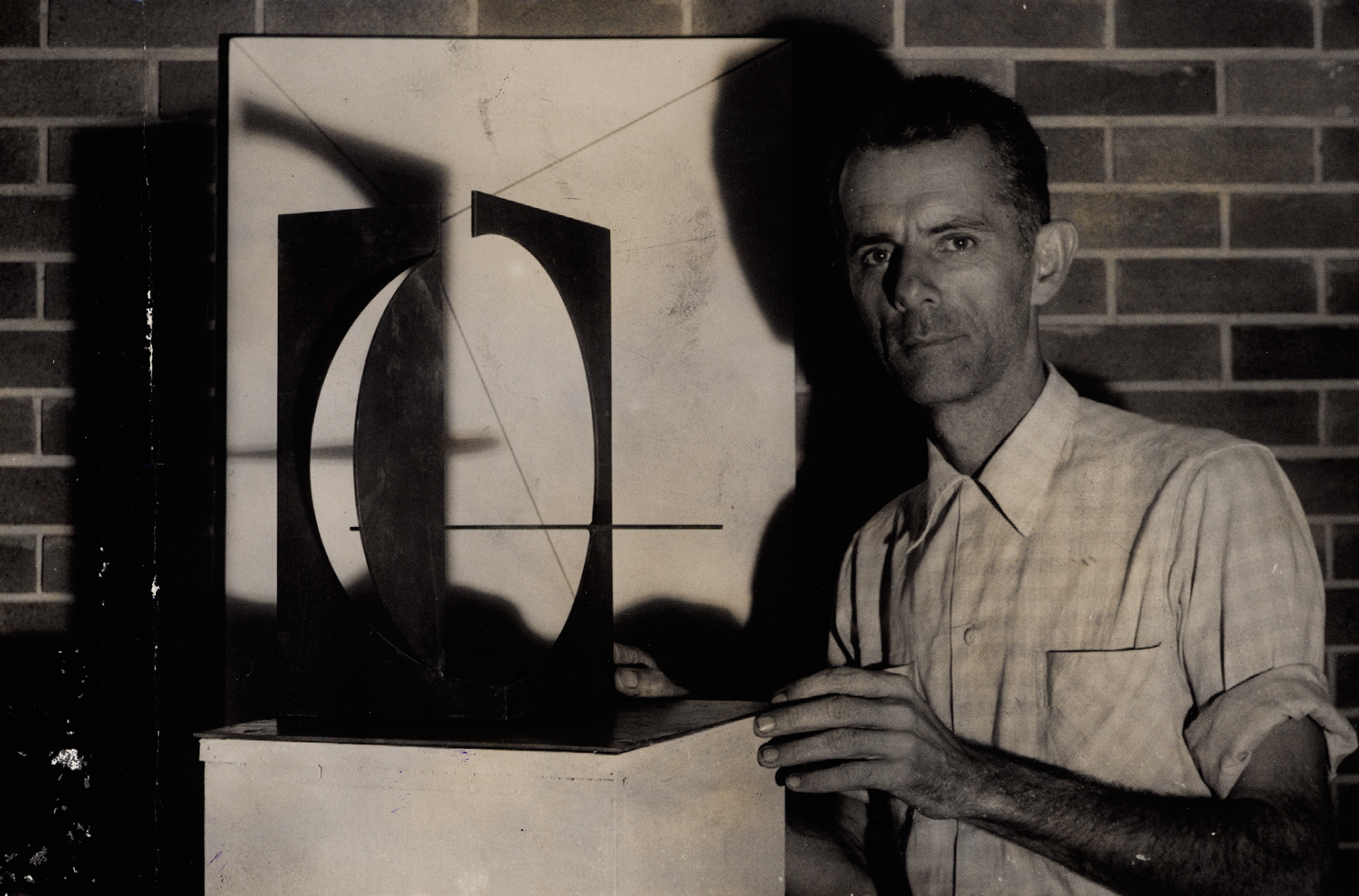
- Franz Weissmann in 1959
- Born: Franz Josef Weissmann; September 15, 1911; Knittelfeld, Austria-Hungary
- Died: July 18, 2005 (aged 93); Rio de Janeiro, Brazil
- Occupation: Sculptor
- Years active: 1950–2005

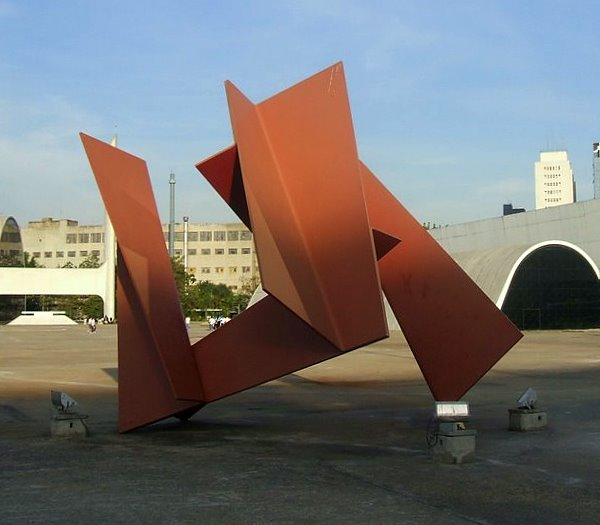
Grande Flor Tropical (1989) – Memorial da América Latina – SP

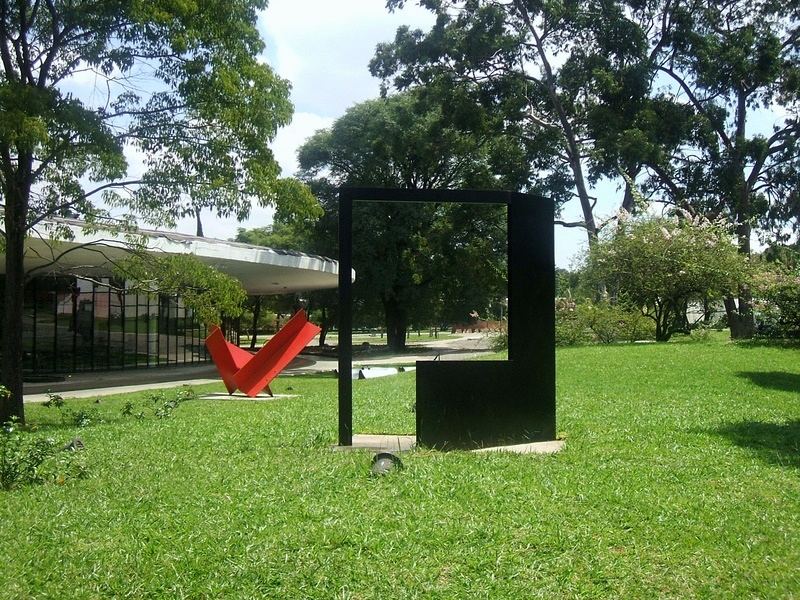
Quadrado Aberto em Fitas (1985) e Flor de Aço (1975) – MAM/SP gardens

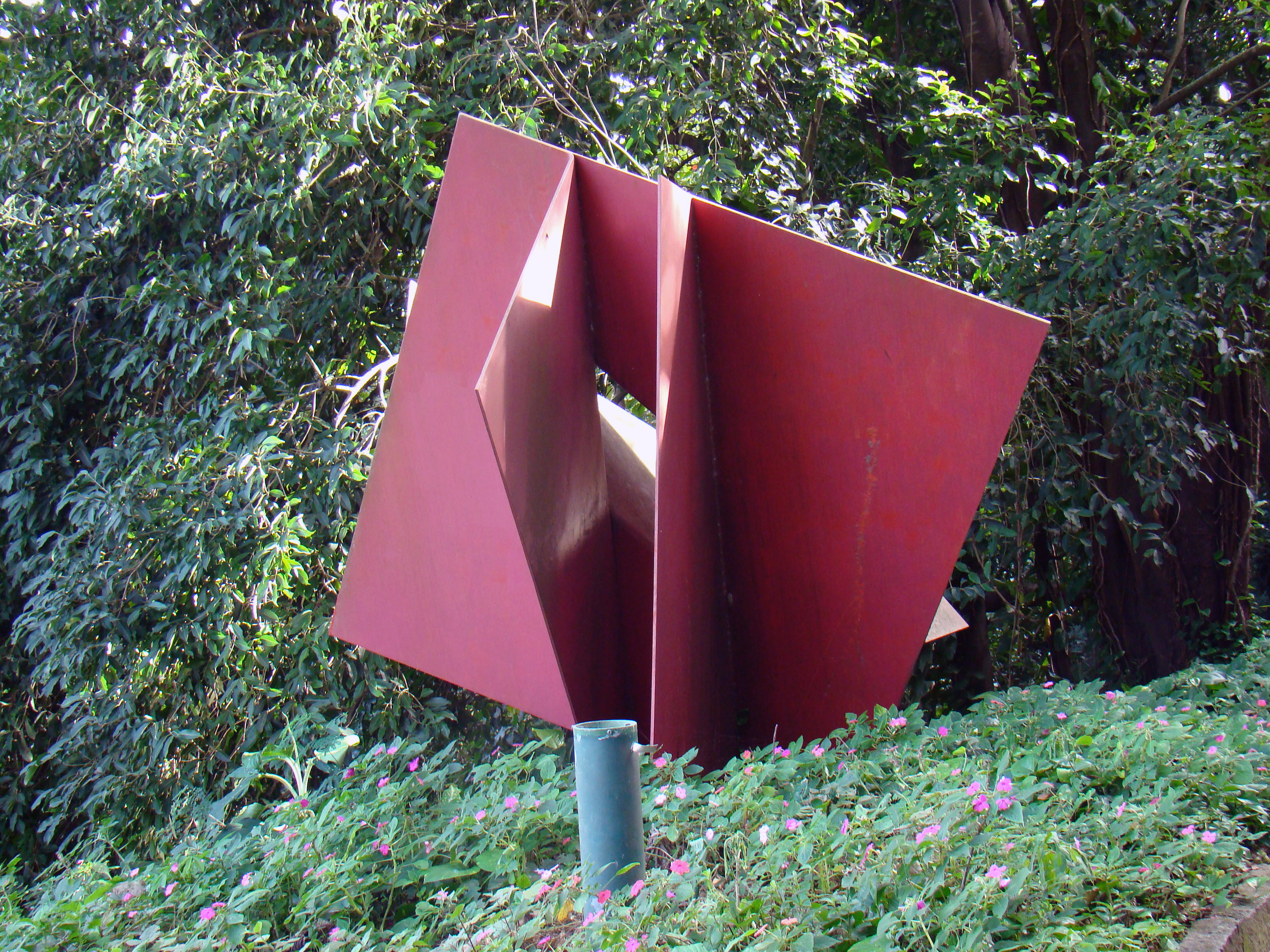
Estrutura em Diagonal (1978) – Parque da Catacumba – Rio de Janeiro

Franz Josef Weissmann (September 15, 1911 – July 18, 2005) was a Brazilian sculptor born in Austria, emigrating to Brazil while he was eleven years old. Geometric shapes, like cubes and squares, are strongly featured in his works. He was one of the founders of the Neo-Concrete Movement.

== Early life and education ==
Weissmann was born in Knittelfeld, Austria. He came to Brasil in 1921. In Rio de Janeiro, between 1939 and 1941, he attended architecture, painting, drawing and sculpture classes at the National School of Fine Arts. From 1942 to 1944, he studied drawing, sculpture, modeling and foundry with August Zamoyski. In 1945, he moved to Belo Horizonte where he taught drawing and sculpture in private classes. Three years later, Alberto da Veiga Guignard invited him to teach at the "Escola do Parque", later renamed Escola Guignard.

== Career ==
Starting from 1950 onwards, he gradually developed a constructivist style, favoring geometric shapes, cutting and folding sheets of iron, steel wires and aluminum. He joined Grupo Frente, in 1955. The next year, he returned to Rio de Janeiro and participated in the National Exposition of Concrete Art in 1957. In 1959 Weissmann traveled to Europe and East Asia, returning to Brazil in 1965.

In the 1960s, Weissmann exhibits the series of sculptures Amassados (Dented), which he created in Europe with hammered zinc and aluminum sheets, aligning himself briefly to informalism. Later on he returned to the constructivist works. In 1970 he won the award for best sculptor by the Brazilian Association of Art Critics and participated in the International Outdoor Sculpture Biennial, in Antwerp, Belgium, and at the Venice Biennale.

Weissmann made several public art sculptures for Brazilian cities, like at Praça da Sé, in São Paulo and at Parque da Catacumba, in Rio de Janeiro. He kept studios in Belo Horizonte (1950); Madrid, (1962) and Ipanema, Rio de Janeiro (1956 and 1965).

== Individual exhibitions ==
- 1962 Galeria São Jorge – Madri, Espanha
- 1963 Casa do Brasil – Roma, Itália
- 1964 Weissmann: chapas/dibujos' – Sala Nebli – Madri, Espanha
- 1972 Galeria Grupo B -Rio de Janeiro
- 1975 Franz Weissmann: esculturas, relevos e múltiplos' – Galeria de Arte Global -São Paulo
- 1975 Petite Galerie – Rio de Janeiro
- 1981 A Mecânica do Lirismo – Skultura Galeria de Arte – São Paulo
- 1981 Franz Weissmann – Galeria IAB/RJ – Rio de Janeiro
- 1981 Galerie Aktuell – Rio de Janeiro
- 1984 A Mecânica do Lirismo – Galeria Paulo Klabin – Rio de Janeiro
- 1985 Franz Weissmann: esculturas recentes – Galeria Thomas Cohn
- 1985 Gabinete de Arte Raquel Arnaud – São Paulo
- 1987 Franz Weissmann – Gesto Gráfico – Belo Horizonte
- 1987 Franz Weissmann – Gabinete de Arte Raquel Arnaud – São Paulo
- 1987 Franz Weissmann – Galeria Investiarte – Rio de Janeiro
- 1994 Franz Weissmann – Gabinete de Arte Raquel Arnaud – São Paulo
- 1996 MuBe – São Paulo
- 1998 Franz Weissmann: uma retrospectiva – CCBB e MAM/RJ
- 1999 Franz Weissmann: uma retrospectiva – MAM/SP
- 2000 Weissmann – Galeria Anna Maria Niemeyer RJ
- 2001 Weissmann – Casa França Brasil – RJ
- 2003 No Fio do Espaço – Galeria Anna Maria Niemeyer RJ

== Selected works ==
- Composition with Semicircles at the Museum of Modern Art, 1953
