= Delmiro Augusto da Cruz Gouveia =

Brazilian entrepreneur

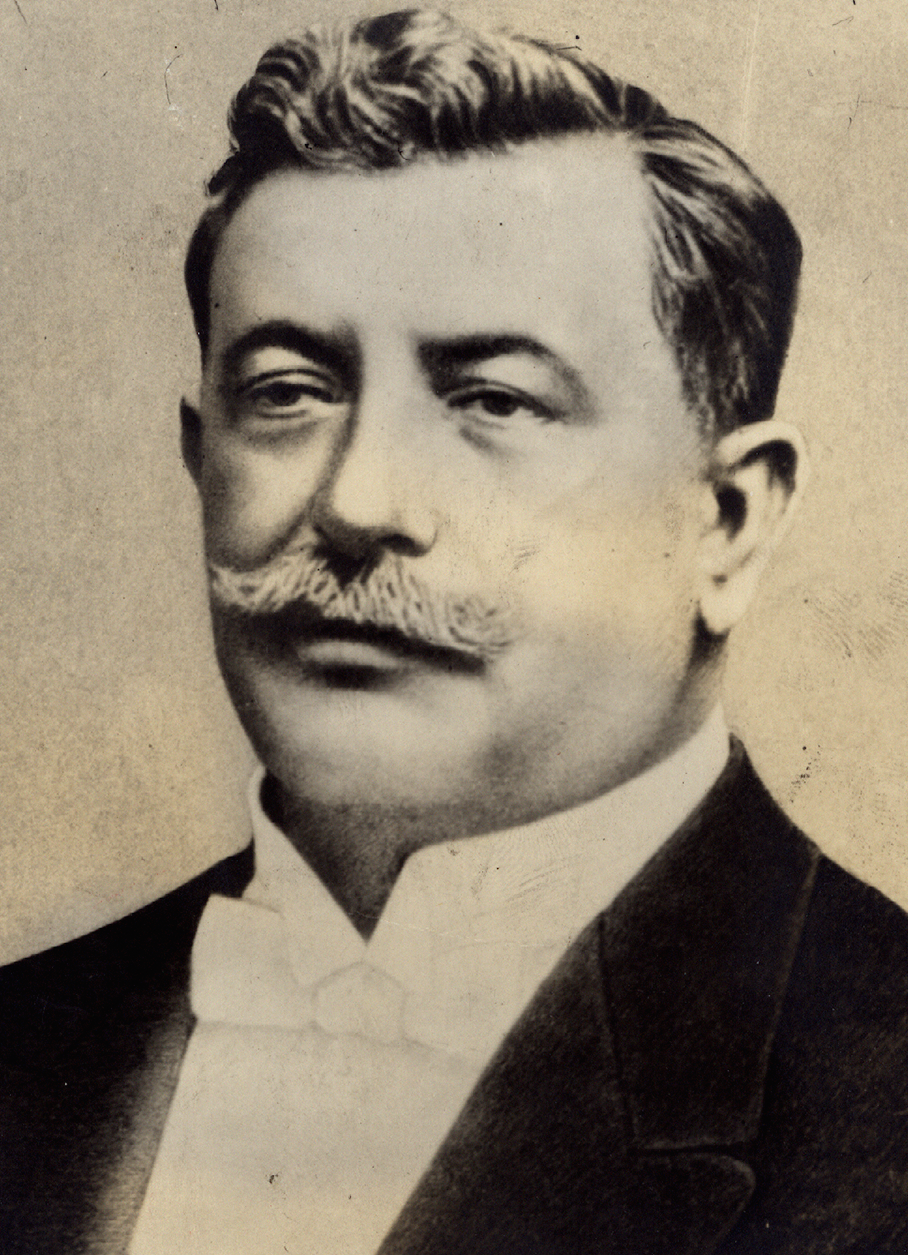
- Delmiro Gouveia
- Born: June 5, 1863; Fazenda Boa Vista, Ipu, Ceará, Brazil
- Died: October 10, 1917 (aged 54); Padra, Brazil
- Cause of death: Murdered
- Occupations: Entrepreneur, industrialist
- Known for: Pioneers of the industrialization of Brazil

Delmiro Augusto da Cruz Gouveia, better known as Delmiro Gouveia (Ipu, Ceará, June 5, 1863 — Pedra, October 10, 1917), was a Brazilian industrialist and entrepreneur.

One of the pioneers of the industrialization of Brazil and the use of its hydroelectric potential, when he built the first hydroelectric plant in the Northeast and the second in the country, the Usina Hidrelétrica de Angiquinho, preceded only by Marmelos Hydroelectric Power Plant.

He was also the creator of what is considered the first shopping center in Brazil, the Mercado Modelo Coelho Cintra, inaugurated on September 7, 1899, in Recife.

== Early life ==
He was born at Fazenda Boa Vista, in the municipality of Ipu, in Ceará, the son of Leonila Flora da Cruz Gouveia from Pernambuco and Delmiro Porfírio de Farias from Ceará. His family moved in 1868 to the state of Pernambuco, where he settled in the city of Goiana, moving to Recife in 1872.

With the death of his mother, he had to start working at the age of 15, in 1878, initially as a conductor for the Brazilian Street Railways Company on the urban train, called maxambomba. He later became Chief of the Caxangá Station, in Recife. He was a dispatcher in a cotton warehouse.

In 1883 he went to the interior of Pernambuco, interested in the trade in goat and sheep skins, which he began to trade with great success. In 1886 he established himself in the leather business and started to work, on commission, for the Swedish immigrant Herman Theodor Lundgren (Casas Pernambucanas) and for other companies specialized in this trade, such as Levy & Cia. . He also worked on his own. In 1896, he founded the company Delmiro Gouveia & Cia and started to eliminate his competitors from the market, employing the best employees of the competing companies.

== Major achievements ==
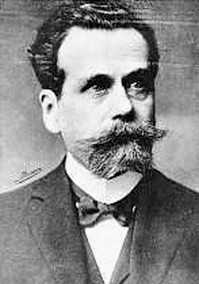
Conselheiro Rosa e Silva, Vice President of Brazil, and Sigismundo Gonçalves, Governor of Pernambuco.

In 1899, inspired by the 1893 Chicago International Fair, he inaugurated the Mercado Modelo Coelho Cintra in Recife, a modern shopping and leisure center that can be considered the first shopping center in Brazil. This undertaking was a great success and a source of pride for Recife, and attracted crowds estimated at more than 8,000 people, until it was deliberately set on fire on January 2, 1900, by the Pernambuco police, on the orders of the Conselheiro Rosa e Silva, at the time vice-president of the country, who was a fierce political enemy of Delmiro, and at the behest of the then governor Sigismundo Gonçalves, faithful rocista.

After the fire, started for political reasons at the Derby Centro Comercial, and also because he fell in love with, and later kidnapped, a natural 16-year-old daughter of the then governor of Pernambuco, his political arch-enemy, Delmiro concluded that his life was in danger in Recife and, in 1903, he moved to Pedra, in Alagoas, a village lost in the heart of the sertão, but strategically located for its trade, in the Microregion of Alagoas in the Sertão do São Francisco, bordering Pernambuco, Sergipe and Bahia, and today called Delmiro Gouveia in his honor. Delmiro bought a farm in Pedra, on the margins of the Paulo Affonso Railroad, where he centralized his lucrative fur trade and built corrals, a dam, his residence, and buildings to house a tannery.

Planning to build a sewing thread factory there – which until then were imported from England, the well-known Linhas Corrente, which monopolized the Brazilian market, and appealing to nationalist, nativist ideals and civic interests then in vogue, he obtained concessions from the government of Alagoas that included the right to own vacant land, tax exemption for the future factory, and permission to capture energy from the Paulo Afonso waterfall, in addition to government resources for help build 520 kilometers of roads connecting Pedra to other locations. From 1912, construction began on the yarn factory and the Vila Operária da Pedra, with more than 200 masonry houses. On January 26, 1913, he inaugurated the first hydroelectric plant in Northeast Brazil with a capacity of 1,500 HP at the Angiquinho Falls. In 1914, the new factory began its activities under the corporate name Companhia Agro Fabril Mercantil, producing lines with the trade name "Estrela" for Brazil, and "Barrilejo" for the rest of Latin America. With prices far below "Linhas Corrente", produced in England by Machine Cotton, which until then had monopolized the sewing thread market throughout Latin America, logo dominated the Brazilian market, and large slices of Latin American markets.

The success of the company, which in 1916 was already producing more than 500,000 spools of thread per day, caught the attention of the English conglomerate Machine Cotton, which tried by all means to buy the factory. For political reasons and land issues, Delmiro Gouveia came into conflict with several colonels in the region, which probably, according to most historians, caused his mysterious gunshot murder. Other historians, supported by the concept of Roman Law qui prodest?, what was this good for? who did it benefit? include Cotton Machine in the list of suspects. "Linhas Corrente", which had the machines destroyed, the buildings demolished and the machinery and debris thrown into the São Francisco River, thus getting rid of an uncomfortable competition.

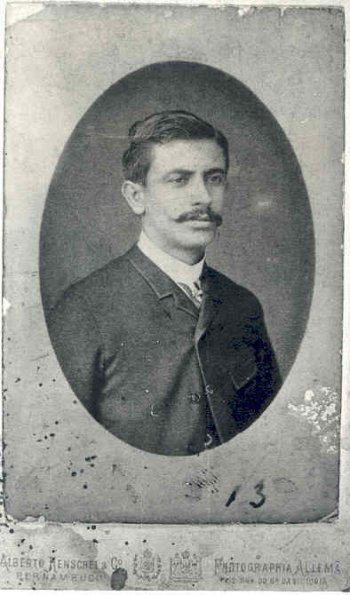
Delmiro Gouveia, Brazilian industrialist (c. 1885).

== Highlights ==
He built the second hydroelectric plant in Brazil, a plant with a power of 1 500 HP, at Angiquinho Falls, a waterfall at Paulo Afonso. "He exported goat skins to New York fashion a century before the 'fashion' world was heard around here", says an article. In 1899, the first shopping center in Brazil, the Derby, was inaugurated in Recife, a commercial and leisure center with market, hotel, casino, velodrome, amusement park and residential allotment. In 1914 he founded Companhia Agro Fabril Mercantil, the first in South America to manufacture sewing threads and yarn for knitting. After his murder – still unclear – the original machinery of Companhia Agro Fabril Mercantil was thrown over a cliff in the São Francisco river by the Scottish group Machine Cotton who bought the company from its successors, to destroy it, thus getting rid of its competition in the field.

== Movies ==
- Delmiro Gouveia: O Homem e a Terra, directed by Geraldo Sarno, documentary, B&W, 90 min, Rio de Janeiro, 1971
- Coronel Delmiro Gouveia, directed by Geraldo Sarno, fiction, color, 90 min. Rio de Janeiro 1978

== Chronology ==
- 1863 – Delmiro is born, in the District of Santo Izidro, Ipu.
- 1868 – Transfer to Pernambuco
- 1883 – Purchase and export of furs
- 1886 – Leather branch
- 1896 – Casa Delmiro Gouveia and Co.
- 1898 – Construction of the model market in Derby (Recife)
- 1903 – Chooses the village of Pedra (280 km from Maceió, capital of Alagoas), current Delmiro Gouveia.
- 1910 – Use of the Paulo Afonso waterfall
- 1912 – Cia Agro Fabril Mercantil and construction of Vila Operária Padrão
- 1913 – Hydroelectric power from the fall of Angiquinho, Cachoeira in Paulo Afonso.
- 1914 – Estrela manufactures sewing threads
- 1917 – He is murdered at the age of 54.
