= Shape of Light: 100 Years of Photography and Abstract Art =

- 2018 exhibition held at Tate Modern
- Location: Tate Modern, London, England
- Exhibited: Over 350 works by more than 100 artists
- Organiser: Simon Baker, Emmanuelle de l'Ecotais, Shoair Mavlian, Sarah Allen
- Followed by: www.tate.org.uk/whats-on/tate-modern/shape-light

Shape of Light: 100 Years of Photography and Abstract Art was a major exhibition held at Tate Modern, London, from 2 May to 14 October 2018. Surveying work from the 1910s to the present, it examined the relationship between photography and abstract art. Tate presented it as the first major exhibition to explore that relationship across the twentieth century and beyond. The exhibition brought together more than 350 works by over 100 artists, displaying photographs alongside paintings, sculptures, and other objects.

== Overview ==
The exhibition traced a history of abstraction in photography by presenting photography not as an isolated medium but as a practice that developed in dialogue with painting and sculpture. In the foreword to the exhibition catalogue, Tate director Frances Morris described its scope as extending from early experiments associated with Cubism and Vorticism through the work of László Moholy-Nagy at the Bauhaus, the Surrealist photography of Man Ray and Brassaï, and on to contemporary artists. The same text emphasised the inclusion not only of canonical twentieth-century figures but also of less familiar artists such as Luo Bonian, working in Shanghai in the 1930s, and Běla Kolářová, active in Prague in the 1960s and 1970s.

The exhibition was organised by Simon Baker, Emmanuelle de l'Ecotais, Shoair Mavlian, and Sarah Allen. It also included a room devoted to a reconsideration of The Sense of Abstraction, a 1960 exhibition at the Museum of Modern Art in New York. According to the catalogue, loans from the Jack Kirkland Collection accounted for almost one third of the exhibition's loans and formed part of a substantial promised gift to Tate.

== Structure ==
According to the catalogue contents page, the exhibition was organised around four chronological sections:

- In Search of a New Reality (1910–1940), by Emmanuelle de l'Ecotais
- Photography's Sense of Abstraction (1940–1960), by Simon Baker
- Control, Order and Disorder (1960–1980), by Shoair Mavlian
- Surfaces and Impressions (1980–present), by Emma Lewis

Tate's exhibition guide described the central concern of the show as the history of abstraction in photography through camera and darkroom experiment, the manipulation of light and materials, repetition, corrosion, and re-photography.

== Catalogue ==
The exhibition catalogue, Shape of Light: 100 Years of Photography and Abstract Art, was published by Tate Publishing in 2018. It was edited by Simon Baker and Emmanuelle de l'Ecotais, with Shoair Mavlian, and included contributions by Sarah Allen, Emma Lewis, and the editors. Published in conjunction with the exhibition, it ran to 224 pages.

== Participating artists ==
More than 100 artists took part in the exhibition. Artists represented included the following figures from Europe, the Americas, and East Asia.

=== Early twentieth century and interwar avant-gardes ===
- Alvin Langdon Coburn
- Alfred Stieglitz
- Paul Strand
- Edward Steichen
- Christian Schad
- Georges Braque
- Wyndham Lewis
- László Moholy-Nagy
- Alexander Rodchenko
- El Lissitzky
- Germaine Krull
- Man Ray
- André Kertész
- Brassaï
- Imogen Cunningham
- Bill Brandt
- Jaromír Funke
- Albert Renger-Patzsch
- Lotte Jacobi
- Josef Sudek
- Florence Henri
- Hans Finsler
- Kurt Seligmann
- Pierre Dubreuil
- Theo van Doesburg
- Constantin Brâncuși
- Wassily Kandinsky
- Joan Miró

=== Mid-century Europe and the Americas ===
- Otto Steinert
- Harry Callahan
- Aaron Siskind
- Frederick Sommer
- Běla Kolářová
- Jay DeFeo
- John Hilliard
- Ed Ruscha
- Sigmar Polke
- William Klein
- Raoul Ubac
- Roger Parry
- Ellsworth Kelly
- Carl Andre
- Judit Kárász
- Peter Keetman
- György Kepes
- Nathan Lerner
- Guy Bourdin
- Margaret Bourke-White
- Arthur Siegel
- Lewis Baltz
- Paul Graham
- Luigi Veronesi
- Geraldo de Barros
- Pierre Cordier
- Floris Neusüss
- German Lorca
- Gaspar Gasparian
- Sameer Makarius
- José Yalenti
- Thomaz Farkas
- Monika von Boch
- Andreas Walser
- Willy Zielke
- Marta Hoepffner
- Emeric Feher
- Inge Dick
- Jared Bark
- Alexandre Vitkine

=== Japan and East Asia ===
- Luo Bonian
- Yasuhiro Ishimoto
- Kansuke Yamamoto
- Daisuke Yokota
- Kanbei Hanaya
- Hiromu Kira

=== Late twentieth century and contemporary practice ===
- Barbara Kasten
- John Divola
- James Welling
- Thomas Ruff
- Luisa Lambri
- Maya Rochat
- Stan Douglas
- Mel Bochner
- Alison Rossiter
- Liz Deschenes
- Antony Cairns

== Reception ==
Reviewing the exhibition for The Guardian, Sean O'Hagan described it as an "epic exhibition" and "an experimental masterclass", praising the way it showed photography moving away from portraiture, landscape, and documentary toward abstraction through the manipulation of light, chemicals, and fragmented reality. In contrast, Laura Cumming wrote in The Guardian that the exhibition failed to define photographic abstraction sharply enough and became repetitive and overextended.

Writing in Felix, Fred S. Fyles singled out Kansuke Yamamoto's The Thrilling Game Related to Photography as emblematic of the exhibition as a whole. He described it as a small boxed work that combines a photograph of shards of glass with actual shards, and argued that it collapsed distinctions between sculpture, art, and photography while retaining a sharp sense of play. Fyles further suggested that such works were among the exhibition's most compelling features precisely because they lay outside the dominant photographic canon.
