= Paulo Aquarone =

Brazilian multimedia poet

- Born: 27 August 1956; São Paulo, Brazil
- Occupation: multimedia poet
- Website: www.pauloaquarone.com

Paulo de Tarso Aquarone (August 27, 1956, São Paulo) is a Brazilian multimedia poet . Produced since the 1990s poetic works with visual appeal, seeking various media to complete them, among them the computer and internet that uses for production and disclosure, considered one of the precursors of digital poetry in Brazil, this period also conducts exhibitions in different local.

== Exposures ==
- 1996 - Individual Exhibition at the "Library Sergio Milliet" Centro Cultural São Paulo, 1–29 February.
- 1997/1998 - Solo Exhibitions, traveling, the Historical Museum of the State Secretariat of Culture of São Paulo - Guaratinguetá, Rio Claro, Vinhedo, Itapecerica da Serra.
- 1997 - Underground Passage of Consolation, São Paulo - SP.
- 1998 - In the lobby of the Secretariat of Culture of São Paulo
- 1999 - Collective exhibition in the Gallery Slavieiro Jo, along with artists of the 50s (50s and their involvement): Alberto Teixeira, Anatol Wladyslaw, Antônio Maluf, Geraldo de Barros, John Graz, Judith Lauand Lothar Charoux, Samson Flexor, Wega Nery and others.
- 2000 - Solo exhibition at the Gallery of the National Library of Lisbon - Portugal (Sept. 28 to Nov. 10), commemorating the 500th anniversary of the discovery of Brazil and sponsored by the National Commission for the Commemorations of the Portuguese discoveries, the Ministry of Culture Portugal. The 40 works (poems and graphics) were donated to the Collection of the National Library, and 30 copies of the 11th book, "Poems and Graphic Illustrations."
- 2001 - Solo exhibition in the lobby of the Caixa Econômica Federal - Centro - SP.
- 2002 - Solo Exhibition Complex at Julio Prestes by the State Ministry of Culture (July–August).
- 2003 - Solo exhibition at the Cultural PRODAM (from February 13 to March 13).
- 2003 - Solo exhibition in the Municipal Library Andrade (01-20 December).
- 2004 - Solo exhibition in Int Paraty Literary Festival (7–11 July).
- 2005 - Solo exhibition at Casa das Rosas-Space Haroldo de Campos, São Paulo - SP from January 28 to March 18.
- 2005 - Solo exhibition in the Hall-Banespa Santander Cultural Center, São Paulo - SP May 30-June 30.
- 2006 - Solo exhibition at the Public Library Alceu Amoroso Lima, São Paulo - SP from February 7 to March 4.
- 2006 - Solo exhibition at the Cultural Public Tendal Lapa, São Paulo - SP from May 8 to June 8.
- 2006 - Shows Technology Connections conference - Sergio Motta Art and Technology in the lobby Senac Scipio Lapa, São Paulo - SP on May 26. Obs.Poemas interactive visual computer.
- 2006 - Solo Exhibition in the Office of Art & Lordello Gobbi, São Paulo - SP, 3 October to 14 November.
- 2007 - Solo exhibition at the Public Library of the State of Rio de Janeiro, Rio de Janeiro - RJ 2 April to 3 May.
- 2007/2010 - Exhibition in digital media (transport and electronic panels), by TVO Mixer, Brazil from November 30 to November 30.
- 2008/2009 - Solo exhibition at the Cultural Center Oduvaldo Vianna Filho - Castelinho do Flamengo, Rio de Janeiro - RJ of 3 December 2008 to February 9, 2009. .
- 2010 - Solo exhibition at the Public Library of the State of Santa Catarina - Florianópolis - SC May 20 to June 25. .
- 2010 - Collective exhibition FILE (Electronic Language International Festival) in the building of FIESP - São Paulo - SP, 27 July to 29 August (artist project participant AlphaAlpha organized by Regina Pinto).
- 2011 - Solo exhibition at the Library of São Paulo - SP from 01 ° to 31 March.
- 2012 - Exhibition video-poem projected on low Center Festival - São Paulo - SP March 23 to April 1
- 2012 - Solo exhibition at Theatro XVIII in Pelourinho - Salvador - BA in July.
- 2013 - Exhibition video-poem projected on low Center Festival - São Paulo - SP 5 to 14 April.
- 2013 - Exhibition in SP-Arte (International art fair) in A Ponte Gallery - São Paulo - SP 3 to 7 April.

== Publications and matters ==
- Cultural digestive (cultural portal) - Brazil.
- Expoesia Visual Experimental (virtual magazine) - Mexico.
- CPV (Center for Visual Poetry) - Spain.
- Berria (electronic journal) – País Basco.
- Digital text (electronic magazine of the UFSC) - Brazil.
- Information Center "Window on America" – Croatia.
- Luis Nassif portal - Cafu blog – Brazil.
- Boek861 (site of visual and experimental poetry) - Spain.
- Hiperscope.
- MeioTom Poesia & Prosa (art site) - Brazil.
- Netzliteratur (site of the digital literature) - Germany.
- Visual poem (site of visual poetry) - Brazil.

== Work ==
- “Poemas Soltos de Mim” (1993),
- “Poemas que Eu Fiz” (1994),
- “Poemas que Vagam” (1994),
- “Poemas de Outono” (1994),
- “Poemas que Eu Conto” (1995),
- “Poemas de Novo” (1995),
- “Poemas das Cores” (1996),
- “Poemas sobre Papel” (1996),
- “Poemas no Livro são letras de Símbolo” (1998),
- “Som das Letras” (1999),
- “Poemas e Ilustrações Gráficas” (2000).
- Editing book “Poemas Escolhidos”, on handmade paper printed in letterpress (30 copies).

== Comments ==
- Paulo Bomfim (poet)
- Augusto de Campos (poet)
- Raphael Galvez (painter and sculptor)
- Ferreira Gullar (poet)
- Judith Lauand (artist)
- Antônio Maluf (artist)
- Antônio Miranda
- Adélia Prado (poet)
- João Scortecci (writer and editor)
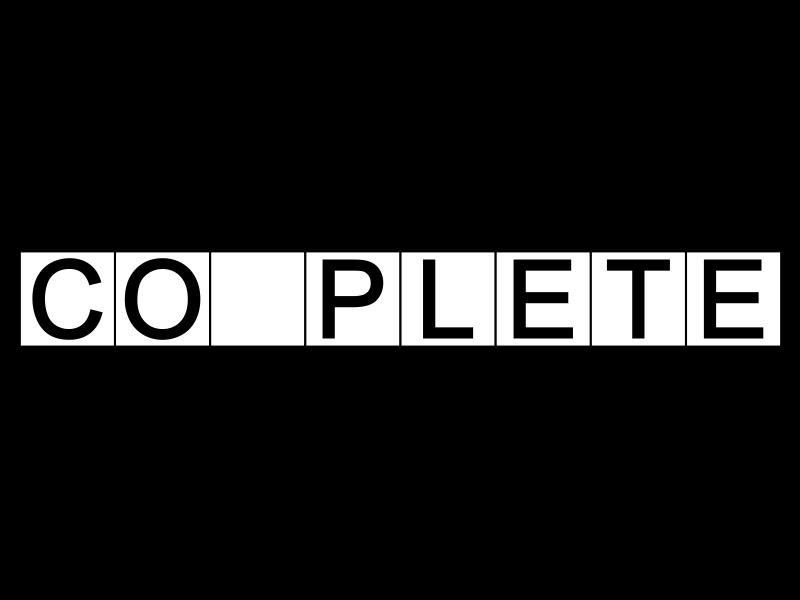
object poem

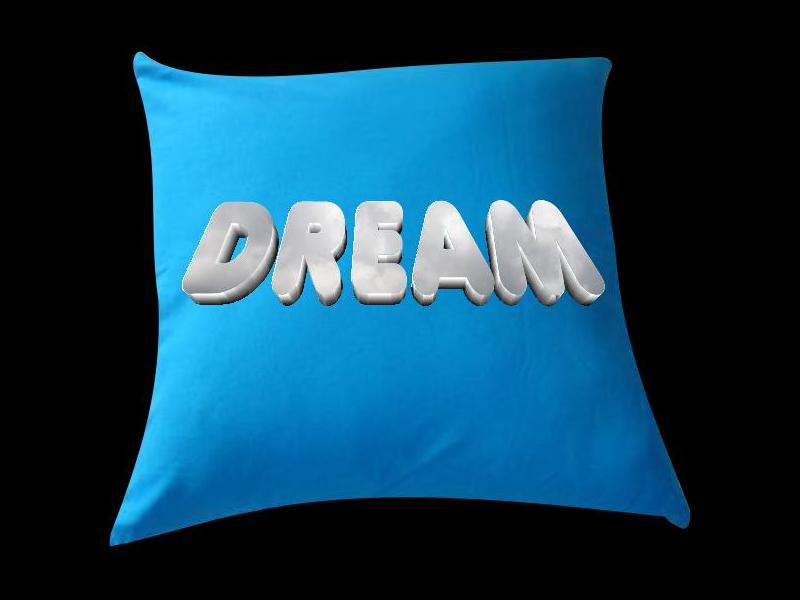
object poem

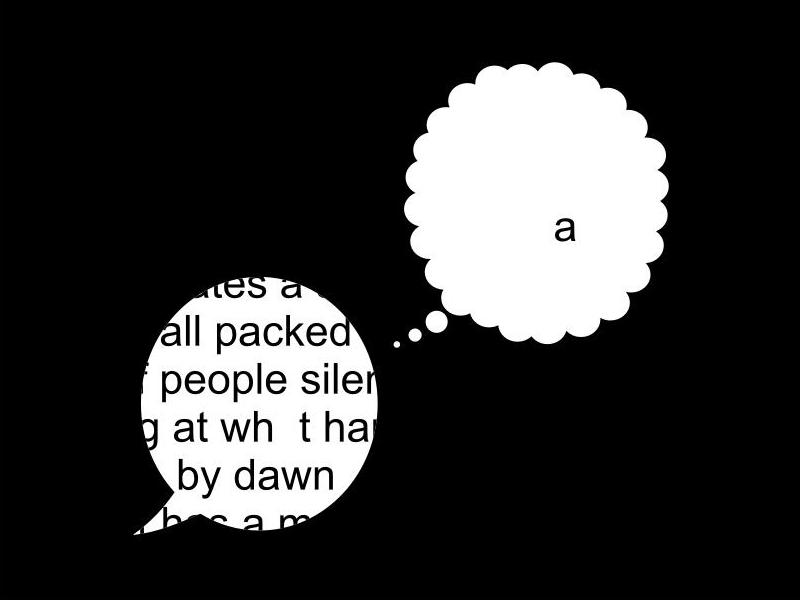
visual poem

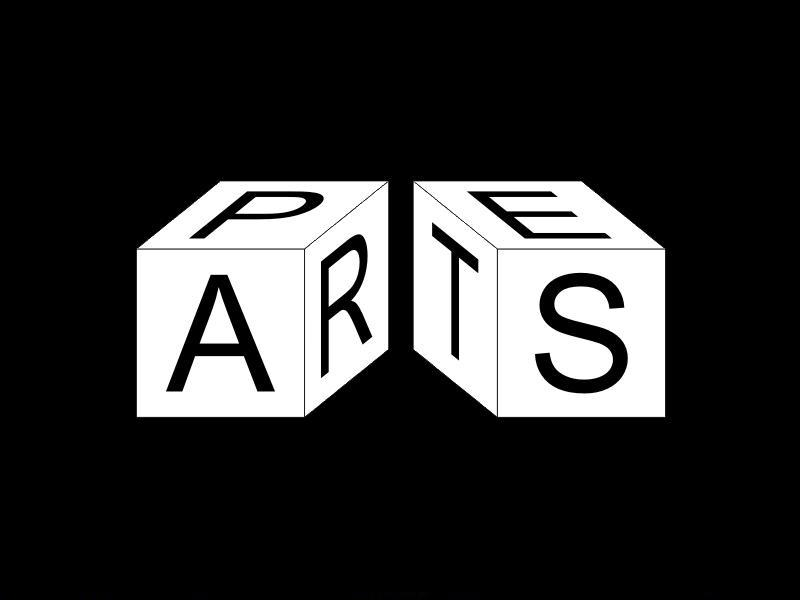
object poem

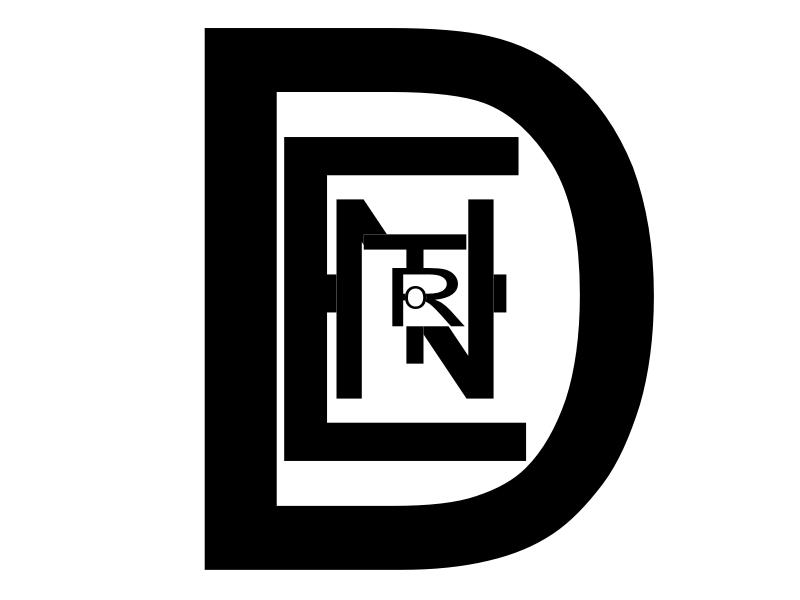
object poem

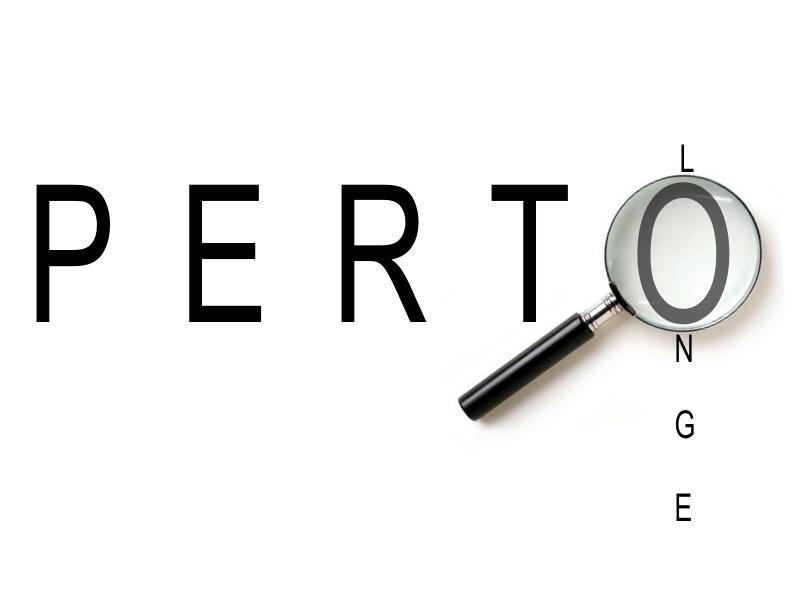
object poem

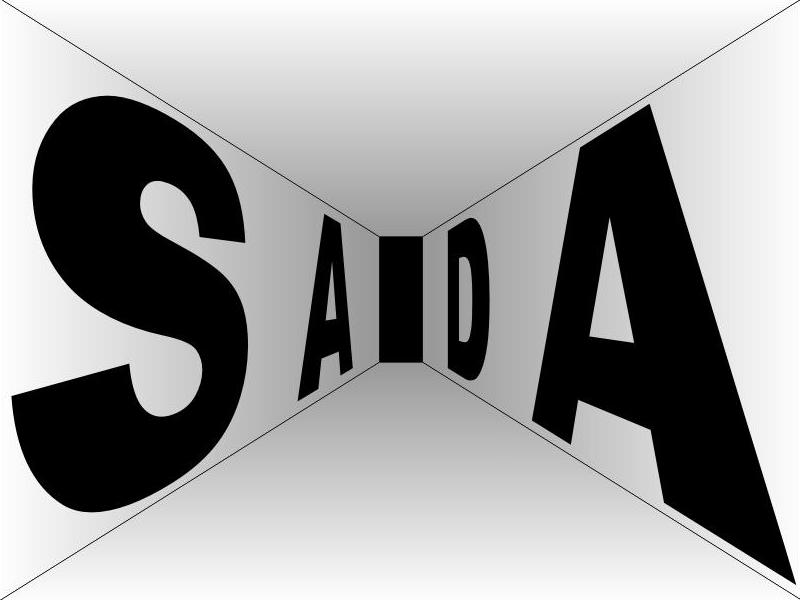
installation poem

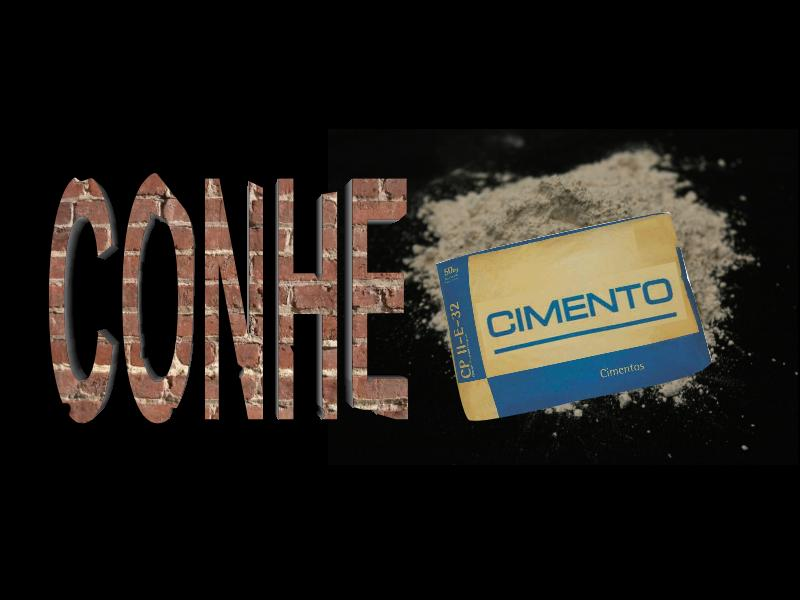
installation poem

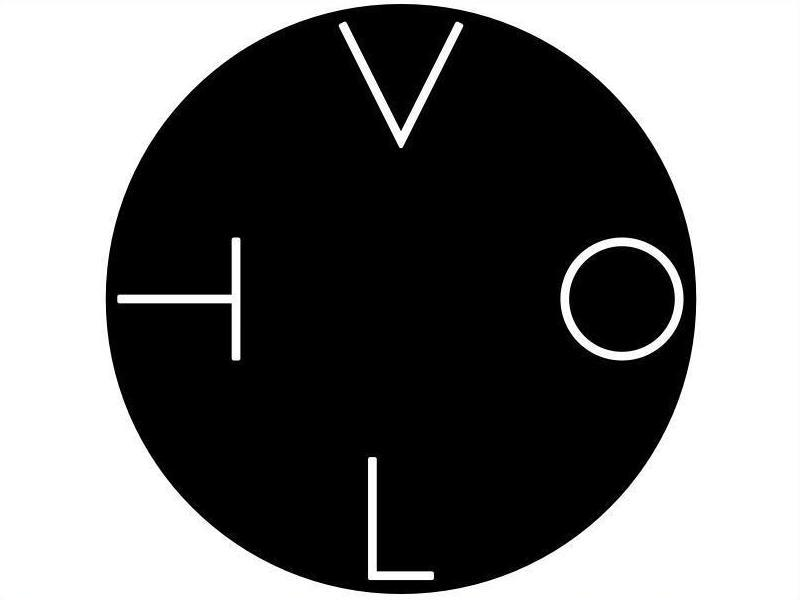
object poem

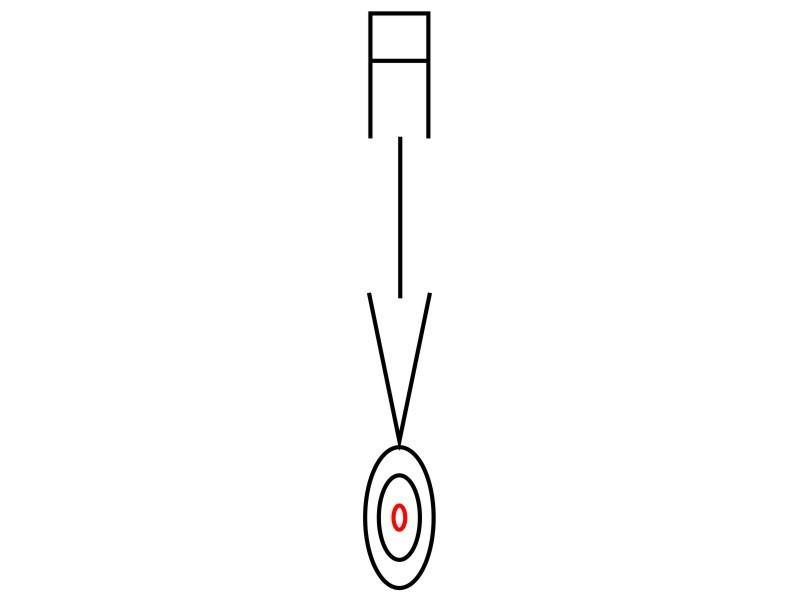
object poem

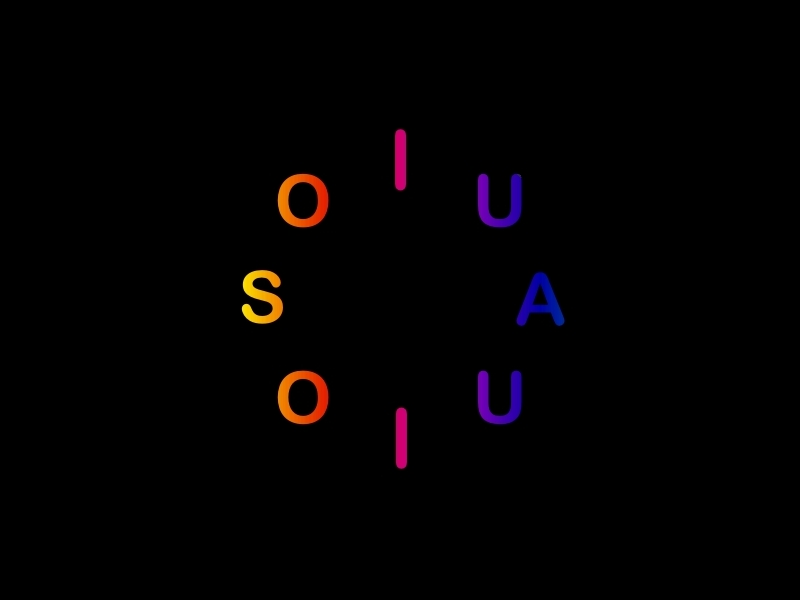
object poem

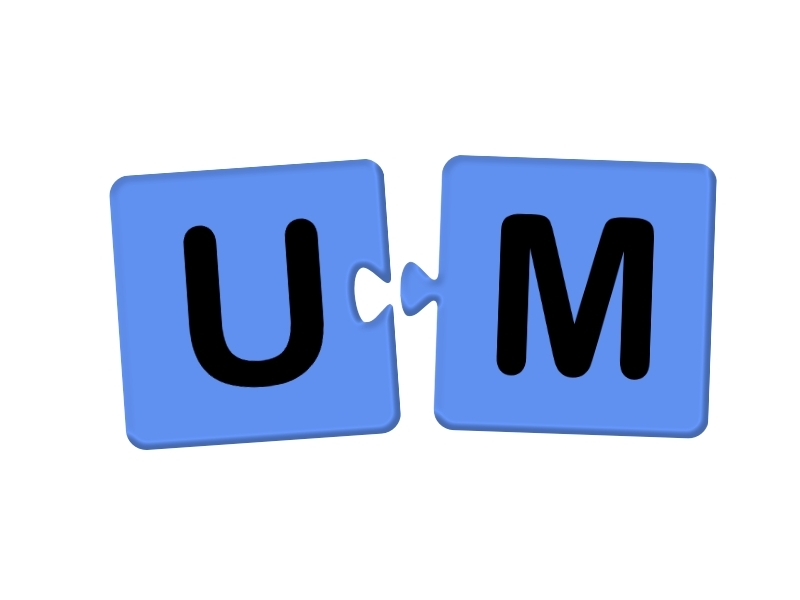
object poem

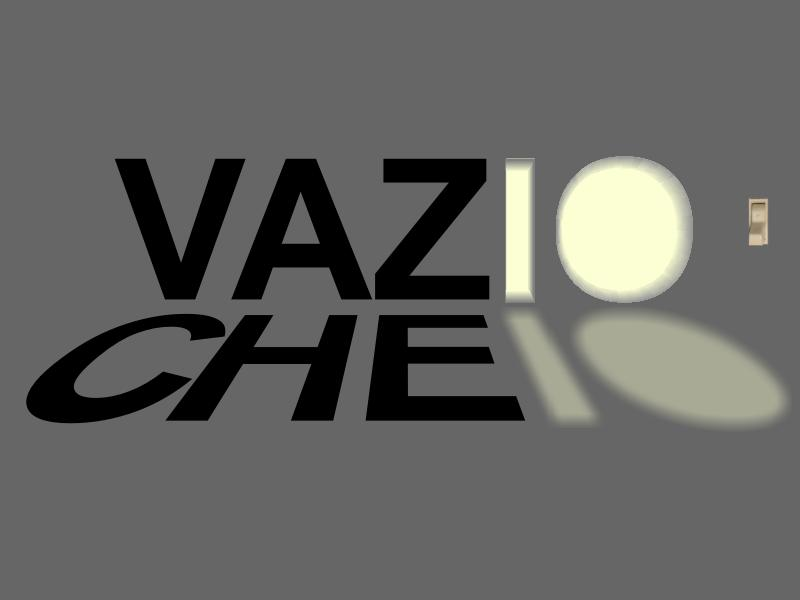
installation poem

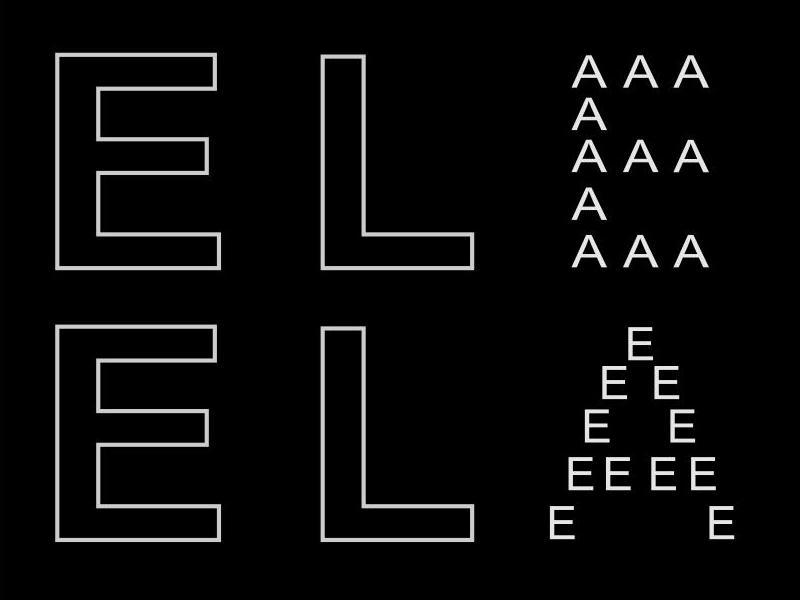
visual poem

object poem

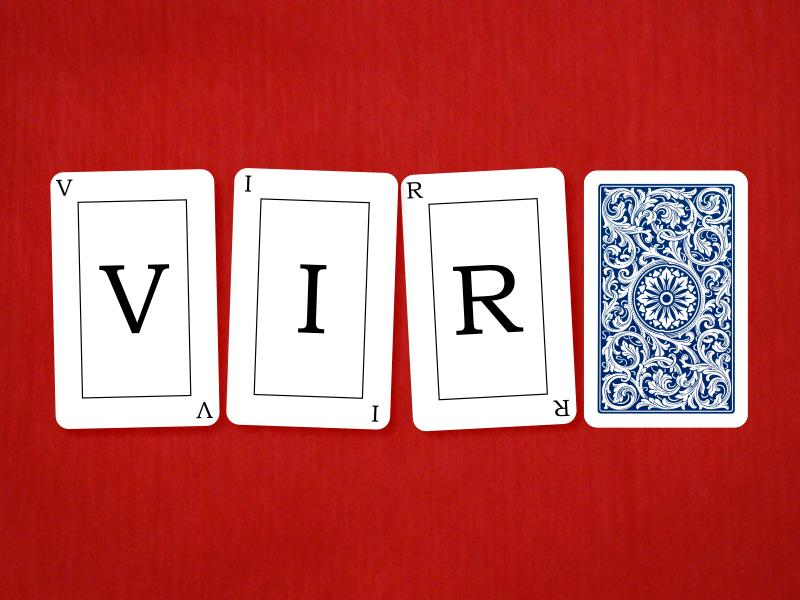
object poem

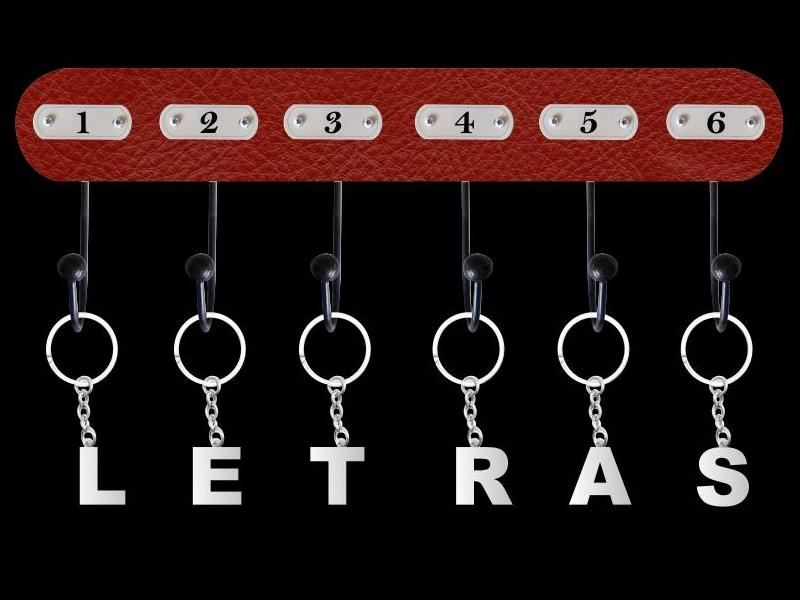
object poem

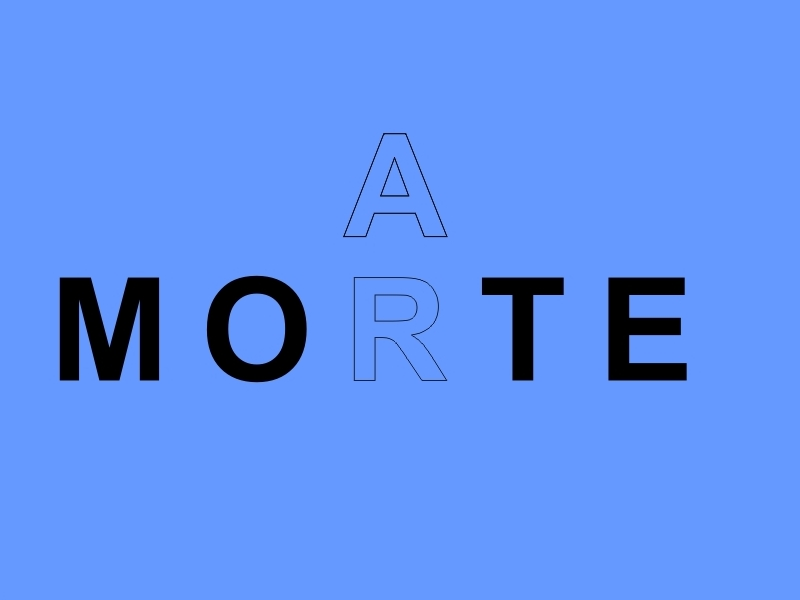
visual poem

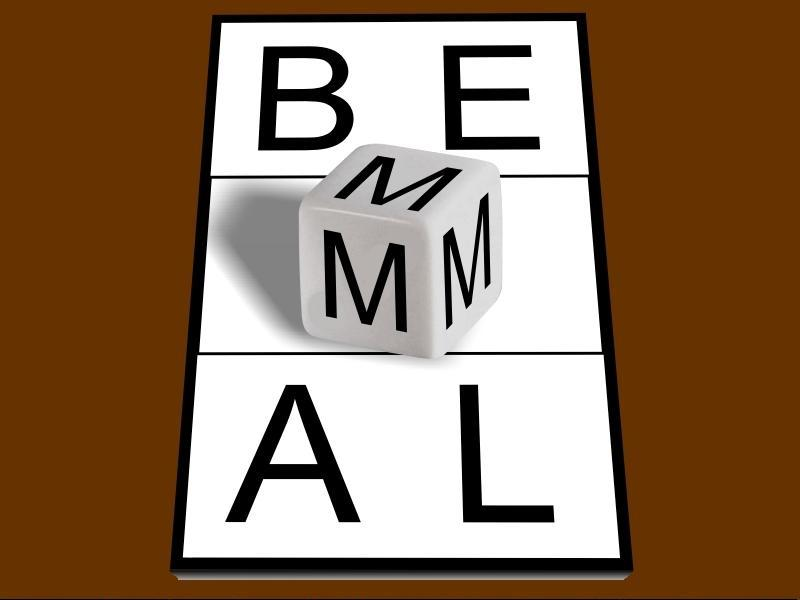
object poem

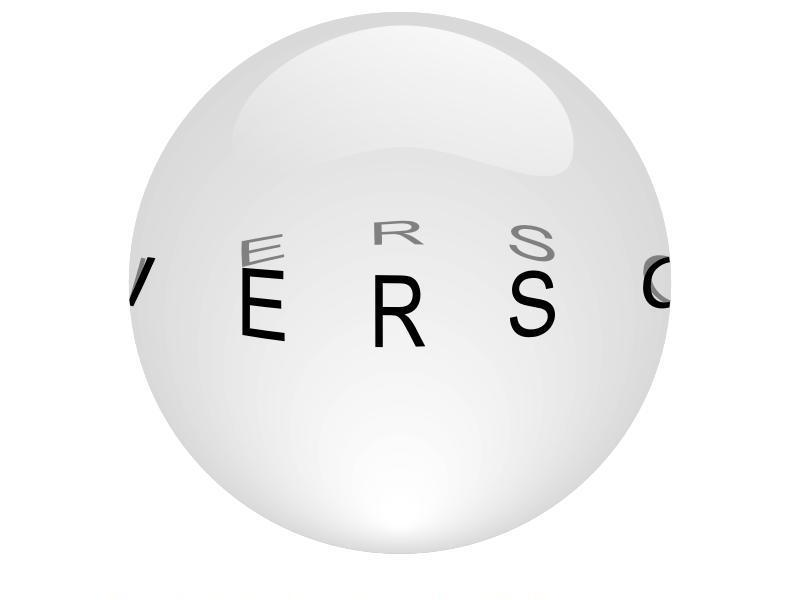
object poem
