= Ruptura =

Ruptura may refer to:

- Ruptura, later Socialist Alternative Movement, a Trotskyist organization in Portugal
- Grupo Ruptura, a collection of artists who sought to advance modern art in Brazil in the 1950s
