= Hermelindo Fiaminghi =

- Born: October 22, 1920; São Paulo, Brazil
- Died: June 29, 2004 (aged 83); São Paulo, Brazil
- Other names: Fiaminghi
- Occupation: Painter
- Years active: 1936-2004
- Website: Fiaminghi.com

Hermelindo Fiaminghi (October 22, 1920 – June 29, 2004) was a Brazilian painter, designer, graphic designer, lithographer, professor, and art critic, known for his geometric works and exploration of color.

== Early life and education ==
Fiaminghi was born in São Paulo, Brazil, the son of Italian immigrants.

From 1936 until 1941, Fiaminghi studied at the Liceu de Artes e Ofícios de São Paulo. While at art school, Fiaminghi took drawing and porcelain painting courses with Giglio as well as courses with Odetto Guersoni, Lothar Charoux, and Waldemar da Costa. Fiaminghi also attended courses in art history held at Da Costa's studio. At the studio he meets many fellow artists, including Clóvis Graciano and Maria Leontina.

In 1942, Fiaminghi began studying with the painter Angelo Simeone at the Associação Paulista de Belas Artes, as well as studying advertising at Associação Paulista de Propaganda and the Instituto de Ciências e Letras Inglesa (Redschow School).

From 1959 to 1966, Fiaminghi attended Alfredo Volpi's studio.

== Career ==
From 1936 to 1939, Fiaminghi worked at Companhia Melhoramentos, where he did book illustration and lithography.

After a job at another lithography company in 1940, Fiaminghi worked at Companhia Lithographica Ypiranga from 1941 to 1944, where he saw the lithographer, Lasar Segall, create his Mangue series, which showed the poverty in the slums of Rio de Janeiro. In 1944 and 1945, he worked at two other lithography companies, Graphicars F. Lanzara and Indústria Gráfica Siqueira Salles Oliveira & Cia, before he started his own company, Graphstudio Ltda.

From 1949 to 1952, after selling his printing business, Faiminghi was hired an advertising art director at Lintas International Advertising S.A., where he worked on the ad account for Gessy-Lever. During this time he spent time painting street scenes in São Paulo with a draftsman named Joaquim Alves who he worked with at Lintas.

In the early 1950s, Fiaminghi began creating works that were abstract art, incorporating elements of constructive art. During this time he joined Grupo Ruptura and created work that is part of the concrete art movement founded by Waldemar Cordeiro.

Fiaminghi did graphic design for posters, illustrating the work of concrete art pioneers Haroldo de Campos, Décio Pignatari, among others.

In the 1960s, Fiaminghi broke with Waldemar Cordeiro and the school of concrete art, and began to explore the use of color, creating works under the term "Corluz," which became the names of many of his exhibition during that time.

== Awards ==
- 1962: 4.º Prêmio Jabuti, Capa category, with Décio Pignatari

== Selected exhibitions ==
Group exhibitions

- 1955: III Bienal Internacional de Arte de São Paulo (São Paulo)
- 1957: IV Bienal Internacional de Arte de São Paulo (São Paulo)
- 1959: V Bienal Internacional de Arte de São Paulo (São Paulo)
- 1960: "Konkrete Kunst." 50 Jahre Entwicklung, Helmhaus (Zürich) [traveling exhibition]
- 1961: VI Bienal Internacional de Arte de São Paulo (São Paulo)
- 1963: VII Bienal Internacional de Arte de São Paulo (São Paulo)
- 1965: VIII Bienal Internacional de Arte de São Paulo (São Paulo)
- 1966: "Seis pesquisadores da arte visual. Alberto Aliberti, Heinz Kühn, Hermelindo Fiaminghi, Kazmer Fejer, Lothar Charoux, Sylvia Mara Gueller." Museu de Arte Contemporânea da Universidade de São Paulo (São Paulo)
- 1973: XII Bienal Internacional de Arte de São Paulo (Special room) (São Paulo)
- 1975: XIII Bienal Internacional de Arte de São Paulo (São Paulo)
- 1977: "Projeto construtivo brasileiro na arte. 1950–1962." Museu de Arte Moderna do Rio de Janeiro (Rio de Janeiro); Pinacoteca do Estado de São Paulo (São Paulo)
- 1984: "Tradição e ruptura. Síntese de arte e cultura brasileras." Fundação Bienal de São Paulo (São Paulo)
- 2000: "Século 20. Arte do Brasil." Fundação Calouste Gulbenkian, Centro de Arte Moderna José de Azeredo Perdigão (Lisbon)
- 2003: "Cuasi-corpus. Arte concreto y neoconcreto de Brasil." Museo de Arte Contemporáneo Internacional Rufino Tamayo (Mexico City); Museo de Arte Contemporáneo (Monterrey)
- 2007: "Desenho construtivista brasileiro." Museu de Arte Moderna do Rio de Janeiro (Rio de Janeiro)
- 2007: "The Geometry of Hope. Latin American Abstract Art from the Patricia Phelps de Cisneros Collection." Blanton Museum of Art, The University of Texas at Austin (Austin, Texas); Grey Art Gallery, New York University (New York)
- 2010: "Vibración. Moderne Kunst aus Lateinamerika. The Ella Fontanals-Cisneros Collection." Bundeskunsthalle (Bonn)
- 2013: "Sensitive Geometries. Brazil 1950s – 1980s." Hauser & Wirth New York, 69th Street (New York) – 12 September – 26 October 2013

Solo exhibitions

- 1961: Galeria Aremar, Campinas (São Paulo) [catalogue]
- 1964: Galeria Novas Tendências (São Paulo)
- 1975: Galeria do Sol (São José dos Campos)
- 1977: A Ponte Galeria de Arte (São Paulo) [catalogue]
- 1980: "Décadas 50/60/70." Museu de Arte (São Paulo)
- 1986: Galeria São Paulo (São Paulo)
- 1990: "Corluz 1990." Galeria Montesanti-Roesler (São Paulo) [catalogue]
- 1992: "Corluz 91160." Museu de Arte de São Paulo Assis Chateaubriand (São Paulo)
- 1995: "Corluz." Galeria São Paulo (São Paulo)
- 1998: "Cor luz." Galeria Nara Roesler (São Paulo)
- 2009: "Cor luz." Dan Galeria (São Paulo)

== Selected works ==
- Alternated 2 at the Museum of Modern Art (1957)
- Virtual XII at Museum of Fine Arts, Houston (1958)
- Virtual XIV at Museum of Fine Arts, Houston (1958)

== Works and publications ==
- Fiaminghi, Maria Lydia (diagramação e coord. do texto) (1980). Fiaminghi: Décadas 50,60,70 (Exhibition catalog) (in Portuguese). São Paulo: Museu de Arte Moderna de Sao Paulo. OCLC 55907153. – Catálogo de exposição 11 de setembro a 12 de outubro de 1980
- Fiaminghi, Hermlindo; Pignatari, Décio (texto); de Campos, Augusto (poema) (1986). Hermlindo Fiaminghi: Maio, 1986 (Exhibition catalog) (in Portuguese). São Paulo: Galeria de Arte São Paulo. OCLC 80187416.
- Fiaminghi, Hermelindo (1995). Fiaminghi, Corluz, 1995 (Exhibition catalog) (in Spanish). São Paulo: Galeria de Arte São Paulo. OCLC 71817437. – Catalog of an exhibition held May 16-June 5, 1995
- Fiaminghi, Hermelindo (1998). Hermelindo Fiaminghi: Cor luz (Exhibition catalog) (in Portuguese). São Paulo: Galeria Nara Roesler. OCLC 384818473. – Catalog of an exhibition held Apr. 23-May 16, 1998 at the Galeria Nara Roesler
- Cabral, Isabella; Fiaminghi, Hermelindo; Amaral Rezende, M.A. (1998). Hermelindo Fiaminghi (in Portuguese). São Paulo: EDUSP, Ed. da Univ. de Saõ Paulo. ISBN 978-8-531-40431-3. OCLC 40550952.
- Fiaminghi, Hermelindo; Cabral, Isabella (2009). Fiaminghi (Exhibition catalog) (in Portuguese). São Paulo: Dan Galeria. OCLC 431299832. – Catalog of an exhibition held May 25-June 15, 2009 at the Dan Galeria, São Paulo
- Fiaminghi, Hermelindo; Bousso, Vitória Daniela (2014). Corluz: Fiaminghi and the Concrete Paradigm (Exhibition catalog). São Paulo: Dan Galeria. OCLC 897472051. – Catalog of the exhibition held at Dan Galeria from August 30-September 30, 2014
