= Grupo Ruptura =

Brazilian 1950s art

Grupo Ruptura was created by a collection of artists who sought to advance modern art in Brazil in the 1950s. Together, they held an exhibition entitled Ruptura at the São Paulo Museum of Modern Art in 1952. The group embraced concrete art as a break from traditional naturalistic painting popular in Brazil at the time. Grupo Ruptura's works are often characterized by strong geometric shapes and bold colors.

== Influences ==
Following concepts found in Constructivism and the De Stijl movements, the Rupture artists produced artworks that rejected realistic and traditional subject matter, such as the human form. Instead, artists utilized and purposefully integrated mathematical formulas and drew upon scientific theories in order to create the precise non-representational products typically unattainable by the human eye or hand alone.

== About ==
In 1952, the Museu de Arte Moderna de São Paulo held Grupo Ruptura's first show, which opened on December 9. The seven members released a manifesto stating what they hoped to build upon and promote. While all founding members contributed to the initial document, Waldemar Cordeiro acted as spokesman for Grupo Ruptura's main ideologies and wrote the majority, if not all of, the document.

This brief document included a list of trends that were prevalent with opposing groups of the time. According to the founders, "opposing groups" were too entrapped in traditional, often elitist art. This inhibited the groups from comprehending what Grupo Ruptura was setting out to accomplish. Members of Grupo Ruptura declared they would produce "new forms out of principles" by questioning said opposers (i.e. all figurative trends that then dominated the Brazilian art scene).

"The group's unprecedented renewal became fundamental in unfolding important repertoires that today constitutes the vast, multifaceted and complex Brazilian contemporary art." - Fernando Cocchiarale

"Even though it was never fully achieved, the utopian wager by these artists made history, representing a true turning point in the production and discussion of art made in Brazil. Their work influenced important developments, including neo-concretism, which again posed the Ruptura movement’s question of how and for whom art is made." - Luciana Brito

== Founding members ==
The seven founding members of the group were Waldemar Cordeiro, Anatol Władysław, Leopoldo Haar, Lothar Charoux, Kazmer Féjer, Geraldo de Barros, and Luiz Sacilotto. They collectively created a manifesto that described their commitment to objectivity and abstraction, in opposition to figurative painting, which they believed to be inaccessible to the public and clouded by human emotions.

=== Anatol Wladyslaw (1913–2004) ===
Born in Warsaw, Anatol Wladyslaw Naftali is most known for his work as a painter, designer, and engraver. Like many of the founding members of Grupo Ruptura, his background did not originate in the arts. He first earned a degree as an electronic engineer in 1939. Earning his art degree in 1944, he exhibited for the first time shortly after in 1948. Following his first exhibition, he encountered Cordeiro and gained interest in constructivism. Wladyslaw created constructive art through geometric oil paintings. Over time he evolved from constructionist to a sort of informal abstraction, nearing figuration.

A collection of Wladyslaw's work is located at the Museum of Fine Arts, Houston.

=== Geraldo de Barros (1923–1998) ===
Born in São Paulo, Geraldo de Barros played a crucial role in the formation of multiple artistic movements and groups. He began informal artistic studies of drawing and painting in Clovis Graciano's studio in 1945 before formally attending Foto Cine Clube Bandeirante in 1948. His artistic journey began behind the lens in sports photography. He experimented with layering, cutting, drilling, and painting over the photos. Although he is widely known for his participation in Grupo Ruptura, his legacy continues more through his founding of Cooperativa Unilabor and Hobjeto Moveis, where he produced furniture and logo designs. This could perhaps be seen as a more capitalistic project. However, his products were innovative, multi-functional, and accessible to the public. All while adhering to roots in constructive theory and characteristics.

A de Barros exhibition was held at the Tierney Gardarin Gallery.

=== Kazmer Fejer (1923–1989) ===
Known by several names—Kazmer Faith, Casimiro Fejer and Kazmer Fejer—Kazmer Fajer was born in Hungary in 1923. He attended the Academy of Fine Arts in Budapest, where he earned a degree in industrial chemistry. There, he aided in the foundation of the Budapest Artclub in 1945. Through this club, he encountered Waldemar Cordeiro. Although originating in painting and sculpting as separate entities, Fejer is most known for his works done under Grupo Ruptura with glass as his primary material. His work exemplifies the core beliefs of Grupo Ruptura, seen in his desire for calculated precision and the lack of human influence. His education in industrial chemistry proved useful in many ways, in and out of his artistic career. In Paris in 1970, he worked as a chemical engineer in the paint industry. He held a patent for a plastic coloring method.

=== Waldemar Cordeiro (1925–1973) ===
Born in Rome, and the son of an Italian and a Brazilian, Waldemar Cordeiro was a central figure in Brazilian art in the twentieth century for his articulation of concretism. He attended the Accademia di Belle Arti (Academy of Fine Arts of Florence) and began his artistic career as a caricaturist in 1943 for the satirical newspaper Petirosso. He had brief stints as both an art critic and journalist. He implemented technology to create a new form of "programmed paintings" in the late 1960s that spoke with a then unheard-of and unusual optimism towards technology.

=== Leopold Haar (1910–1954) ===
Unlike the other founding members, Leopold Haar is unique in that his academic studies did not originate in science or technologies. He was born in Tarnov, Poland. He began his academic career in Krakow at the Krakow Academy of Fine Arts. There, he specialized in fine arts applied to industry. During World War II (1939–1945), Haar moved from place to place, landing in Southern Brazil, where he briefly worked for the O Globo Magazine based out of Porto Alegre. He moved on to work with his brother, Zigmund Haar, in Panama. They opened a studio as photographers. Eventually settling in São Paulo in 1950, Haar began work in advertising and became a professor, teaching graphic arts at the Institute of Contemporary Art (IAC). This was not only significant for his career, but also for being the first initiative to teach industrial design in Brazil. His contribution to the Grupo Ruptura exhibition in 1952 was 3D geometric designs that resemble children's hanging mobiles.

Haar's work was shown at the Galleria Luciana Brito.

=== Lothar Charoux (1912–1987) ===
Lothar Charoux was born in Vienna in 1912 into a family of artists. He began studying with his uncle, Austrian sculptor Siegfried Charoux. He settled in the epicenter of the concrete movement in 1928. He attended art school in São Paulo and began studying painting under Walemar da Costa, where he began painting the then traditional expressionist portraits and formal landscapes.

After holding his first solo exhibition, he fell for the emerging ideologies of constructionist art. From 1948 on, he began exploring white coloring and line works on black canvases, admiring the juxtaposition and luminous value it held. His admiration for visual tension between the work and surface it lived on can be seen through his following works of hollow geometric shapes and sharp line work that plays with visual planes and their balance.

Charoux's work was shown at the Miami Sammer Gallery.

=== Luiz Sacilotto (1924–2003) ===
Born in 1924, Luiz Sacilotto studied painting and drawing at the Brás Male Professional Institute. He continued his artistic studies at the Fine Arts University Center of São Paulo. He branched out into design and sculpture, and was fond of Brazilian abstraction. While exhibiting collaborated architecture works with colleagues whom he met at Bras Male Professional Institute (Marcelo Grassman, Octavio Araujo, & Andreatini). They became known as the Expressionist Group for their specific styles that deviated from traditional architectural norm of the time. In the same year, he participated in the 19 Painters Exhibition in São Paulo at the Prestes Maia Gallery. During this showcase, he met Waldemar Cordeiro, Lothar Charoux and Gerarldo de Barros.

Sacilotto's work was held at the MoMA, as part of a larger exhibition.

== Other members ==
Other members included Hermilindo Fiaminghi, Judith Lauand, and Mauricio Nogueira Lima. Lauand was the only female member.

=== Hermelindo Fiaminghi (1920–2004) ===
Hermelindo Fiaminghi encountered Grupo Ruptura through his studies under Alfredo Volpi between 1959 and 1966. Like founder Charoux and peer artist Waldemar da Costa, he attended the São Paulo School of the Arts and dedicated his time there primarily to lithography. His career began similarly to a few of Ruptura's founders, in geometric abstraction. Stylistically, he fits well with Ruptura's ideologies. His style was well developed early in his career, where he made use of a small selection of colors and the distinct geometric figuration associated with Grupo Ruptura's works.

His work was shown at Pinta New York.

=== Judith Lauand (1922–present) ===
Judith Lauand is considered a pioneer in her own right for her key role in the Brazilian modernist movement. She is also the only female member of Grupo Ruptura. Hailing from Pontal, São Paulo, Brazil, she graduated from the Escola de Belas Artes in Araraquara, São Paulo State, with a degree in fine arts. She then focused on her career as a school teacher, with art as an aside. During this time her work consisted of expressionist works and figurative paintings. While working as a gallery monitor at the São Paulo Art Biennial, she met the original founders of Ruptura. Cordiero invited her to join Grupo Ruptura. Her mediums include acrylics, oils and enamels, often taking her own form of collage, integrating different dimensions with woodcuts, or fabrics. Lauand was the only one among her contemporaries to sign her finished works. Viewers and contemporaries often viewed her signature as a rejection of the theoretical aesthetic that existed in and by other artists during this time who did not sign their works. She remained the only female member of Grupo Ruptura until its disbandment.

=== Mauricio Nogueira Lima (1939–1999) ===
Mauricio Nogueira Lima was born on April 18, 1930, to Marie and Manuel Lima. In search for a better life, his parents relocated to São Paulo. There he attended and earned a degree at the Institute of Contemporary Art in São Paulo, with Haar in his peer group. He studied industrial design, visual communication and advertising. True to the degree, he recognized the power that art has to communicate to the viewer. This concept of communication, specifically through architecture and drawing, remained apparent and well assimilated throughout the rest of his artistic career. His works showcase his interests with the constructive discipline, making use of chromatic experimentation and line work to create movement and rhythms to the viewer's eye.
