= Geraldo Sarno =

Brazilian screenwriter and film director (1938–2022)

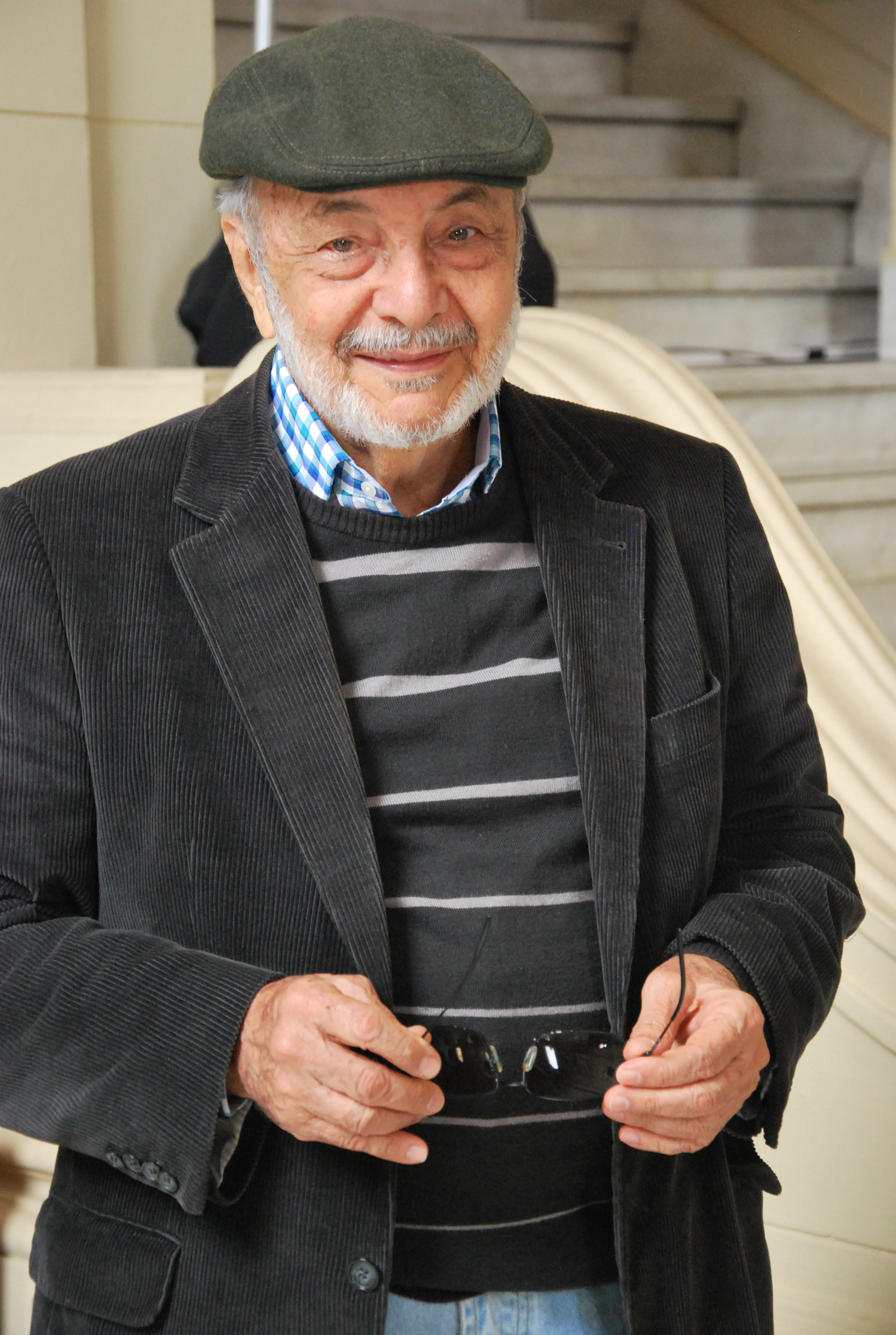
- Sarno in 2012
- Born: 6 March 1938; Poções, Bahia, Brazil
- Died: 22 February 2022 (aged 83); Rio de Janeiro, Brazil
- Occupation: Filmmaker

Geraldo Sarno (6 March 1938 – 22 February 2022) was a Brazilian documentarian, screenwriter and film director.

== Life and career ==
Born in Poções, after studying law at the Universidad del Salvador Sarno moved to São Paulo where he became an assistant of Thomaz Farkas. He made his directorial debut in 1965 with the Farkas-produced Viramundo, about the internal migration in north-east Brazil, which was one of the major themes in his documentary career.

Among Sarno's best known works was the critically acclaimed film Colonel Delmiro Gouveia (1978), a mix between documentary and fiction which has been described as "the last really significant title of the Cinema Novo movement". In 2008, he won the award for best direction at the Brasília Film Festival for the film Tudo Isto Me Parece Um Sonho, while in 2010 his film O Último Romance de Balzac was awarded the Special Jury Award at the Gramado Film Festival.

Sarno died from complications from COVID-19 on 22 February 2022, at the age of 83.
