= Gertrudes Altschul =

Gertrudes Altschul is German-born Brazilian photographer. Her work is in the collection of the Museum of Modern Art (MoMA).

== Life ==
Born to a Jewish family in 1904, Altschul fled the Nazi regime by immigrating to São Paulo in 1939. Working with her husband Leon, the couple made their living by creating handmade decorative flowers for women's clothing. She joined a photo club in 1952 and was part of a modern photography movement at the time. She is one of the earliest female photographers whose work was recognized.

The photo club, Foto Cine Clube Bandeirante (FCCB), was well known for giving amateur photographers opportunities to explore their art. Like other FCCB members at the time, her photographs focused heavily on urban settings, light, and shapes, Altschul's work also was influenced by her career studying botanical structures. Through the club, her photograph Linhas e Tons (Lines and Tones) was widely shared with photographers in the 1950s. In addition to these themes, some of Altschul's contact sheets show use of studio setups, called “table-tops.” She was the only woman with a considerable body of work created during the height of FCCB's influence. In 2021 - 2022, her work was exhibited at the MoMA. and São Paulo Museum of Art (MASP).

After developing bone cancer, Altschul died in 1962.

== Collections ==
Museum of Modern Art (MoMA)

== Exhibitions ==
=== Museum of Modern Art (MoMa) ===
2017: Making Space:Women Artists and Postwar Abstraction

2019-2020: 409: Abstract Lens, Fall 2019–Fall 2020

2021: Fotoclubismo: Brazilian Modernist Photography, 1946–1964

=== Sao Paolo Museum of Art ===
2021-2022: Gertrudes Altschul, Filigree
