= Foto Cine Clube Bandeirante =

Brazilian photography club

The Foto Cine Clube Bandeirante (FCCB) is a Brazilian photography club, founded in 1939. It became one of the most important and internationally influential photographic clubs in the country, and continues to host various activities today.

== History ==
The Foto Cine Clube Bandeirante (FCCB) was formally established on April 28, 1939 in downtown São Paulo. The Founding General Assembly consisted of fifty men and took place in a hall of the Martinelli Building, where the club would go on to rent multiple rooms as its designated headquarters shortly after. The club was a meeting place for amateur photographers and hobbyists, since most members held other full time roles outside of the club and dedicated their weekends to photographic excursions, exhibitions, and internal competitions.

When the club began, Brazilian artistic photography was deeply rooted in Pictorialism, which is reflected in the works of its early members. Amateur photography clubs like the FCCB led the transition towards photographic experimentation and Modernist aesthetics throughout the first half of the twentieth century. This transition became more intentional between 1945 and 1950, until it was eventually regarded as the Escola Paulista, or "Paulista School," referencing the modernist movement unique to São Paulo's emerging photographers. These changes in photographic technique and approach coincided with the rapidly changing landscapes of São Paulo and Rio de Janeiro into industrialized cities of postwar Brazil. The FCCB also helped bring photography into the mainstream São Paulo art scene, especially once members began exhibiting their work in larger art institutions.

From the FCCB's inception until 1945, the club was simply known as the Foto Clube Bandierante (FCB). The club's creation of a dedicated cinematography department and its involvement with the Amateur Cinema League (ACL) in 1945 led to the name change. Thomaz Farkas was one of the main advocates for the inclusion of film within the club's activities, leading numerous film screenings and proposing a Cine Section in their club publication Boletim Foto-Cine. The Cine Section allowed amateur filmmakers to advance their skills, receive critique, and explore the technical aspects of filmmaking that were not yet widely taught or accessible.

At first, women did not contribute to the FCCB. Women's involvement grew out of members bringing their wives to meetings and events, which led to the creation of a "Secção Feminina" (Women's Section) in 1946. Menha S. Polacow was the first woman to join the club as a photographer in 1947. With the exception of Gertrudes Altschul, there are few remaining photographs from early female members of the FCCB due to the restrictions women experienced when pursuing photography during this time in Brazilian history.

The FCCB moved its headquarters to a purpose-built space at Rua Avanhandava 316 in 1949, which they accomplished without any external assistance. This allowed them to hold photography and film courses, seminars, and film festivals for expanded, international audiences. By the late 1940s and early 1950s, the FCCB became heavily involved with film and photography societies around the world, and made connections with numerous artists outside of Brazil. In 1950, the FCCB was the only non-European country asked to join the International Federation of Photographic Art, or Federation Internationale de l'Art Photographique (FIAP), which brought together fifty five photo clubs from across the globe throughout the next decade.

=== Salons, Biennales, and Exhibitions ===
Catalog for the Salão Internacional de Arte Fotográfica (1949)

On October 3, 1942, the FCCB organized the first Salão Paulista de Arte Fotográfica (São Paulo Salon of Photographic Art) at Galeria Prestes Maia, which was held there annually for the next forty-seven years. The salon's reach and scope became global by its fifth year, resulting in its title change to the Salão Internacional de Arte Fotográfica (International Salon of Photographic Art). The Tenth Salon in 1951 featured photographers from over forty countries.

Member Thomaz Farkas debuted a solo show, Estudos fotográficos (Photographic Studies), at the Museu de Arte Moderna de São Paulo (MAM) in their "Sãlao Pequeno" (Small Salon) in July 1949, which was the first exhibition dedicated to artistic photography in a Brazilian museum.

View of the Sala de Fotografia at the Second São Paulo Biennial, published in Boletim Foto-Cine (January-March 1954).

The FCCB's global network was rapidly expanding by the 1950s. Twenty-two photographs taken by its members were sent to the Salon International d'Art Photographique in Paris in 1951, and within the next two years the club participated in sixty salons, over thirty being international. The FCCB also took part in organizing the first exhibition by a woman photographer in a Brazilian museum through their collaboration with Annemarie Heinrich at the Museu de Arte Moderna de São Paulo (MAM).

In 1953, the FCCB presented photographs in the first "Sala de Fotografia" at the Second São Paulo Biennial, after advocating for a gallery devoted to photography. The gallery featured some photographs by FCCB members, along with selections made by Eduardo Salvatore, José Yalenti, Ademar Manarini, and Geraldo de Barros, chosen from the archive of photographs kept at the FCCB headquarters sent in by artists all over the world.

Foto-Cine (January/February 1969)

Boletim (November 1947)

=== Publications ===
Boletim Foto-Cine (December 1953)

To accompany the first Sãlao Paulista de Arte Fotográfica (São Paulo Salon of Photographic Art) in 1942, the FCCB released a salon catalog. This continued until 1958, the seventeenth consecutive year of the salon, which was by then referred to as the Salão Internacional de Arte Fotográfica (International Salon of Photographic Art).

The FCCB released a monthly bulletin called Boletim beginning in May 1946. In 1950, it became titled Boletim Foto-Cine, and eight years later in 1958, it was simply Foto-Cine. Between 1946 and 1964, the FCCB produced over 140 issues of the bulletin, with consistent monthly production ceasing by 1952. In 1974, the FCCB published a second magazine that ran until 1982 called Foto-Cine-Som, integrating sound ("som") as a cinematographic element worthy of analysis. By 1979, the club reimagined its publication and it became Boletim Informativo, which eventually transformed into a digitized newsletter called Bandierante Informativo sent to members and associates via email in 1999.

Despite its aesthetic changes throughout the years, the purpose of the publication remained the same. It circulated information regarding internal activities like courses, competitions, and critiques, while also sharing current or upcoming salons, workshops, photographic excursions, and other notable events. The early bulletins even featured humorous cartoons, usually done by Geraldo de Barros, and a social section where members could share the happenings of their personal lives, like marriage and travel announcements.

== Notable Members ==
- Thomaz Farkas
- Geraldo de Barros
- German Lorca
- Gertrudes Altschul
- Alice Brill
- Eduardo Salvatore
- Jacob Polacow
- Menha S. Polacow
- Elza Benedict
- Chico Albuquerque
- Madalena Schwartz
- Ademar Manarini
- José Yalenti
- Nelson Kojranski
- Marcel Giró
- Palmira Puig-Giró
- Bárbara Mors
- Rubens Teixeira Scavone
- Armando Moraes Barros
- José Oiticica Filho
- Gaspar Gasparian
- Euclides Machado
- Dulce Carneiro
- Benedito Junqueria Duarte aka "Vamp"
- João Minharro
- Nelson Peterline
- Raul Eitelberg
- Galliano Calllera
- Cesar Anderáos

== Presence Today ==
The FCCB is still active and welcomes new members at any skill level. Members continue to participate in photographic excursions and receive special benefits through their membership, including discounts on workshops and courses, access to their studios and library, and participation in various biennales, photo tours, and shows.
