= Geraldo de Barros =

Brazilian painter and photographer (1923–1998)

- Born: February 27, 1923; Chavantes, São Paulo, Brazil
- Died: April 17, 1998 (aged 75); São Paulo, Brazil
- Other name: G. Barros
- Occupations: Painter; Photographer
- Years active: 1945–1998
- Website: GeraldodeBarros.com

Geraldo de Barros (February 27, 1923 – April 17, 1998) was a Brazilian painter and photographer who also worked in engraving, graphic arts, and industrial design. He was a leader of the concrete art movement in Brazil, co-founding Grupo Ruptura and was known for his trailblazing work in experimental abstract photography and modernism. According to The Guardian, De Barros was "one of the most influential Brazilian artists of the 20th century." De Barros is best known for his Fotoformas (1946–1952), a series of photographs that used multiple exposures, rotated images, and abstracted forms to capture a phenomenological experience of Brazil's exponential urbanization in the mid-twentieth century.

== Early life and education ==
De Barros was born in the city Chavantes, in the state of São Paulo in Brazil.

When he was 16 years old, De Barros began taking pictures using a homemade camera that he built himself. At the time he was interested in experimenting with scratching and manipulating the negatives and images.

From 1945 to 1947, De Barros studied drawing and painting with Clóvis Graciano, Collete Pujol, and Yoshioka Takaoka, with a focus on figurative and landscape painting. He moved into the world of abstraction and studied European abstract constructivism and art of the 1920s and 1930s. He was particularly influenced by Piet Mondrian and Theo van Doesburg and the De Stijl movement.

In 1946, De Barros began studying painting at the Associaçião Paulista de Belas Artes.

== Career ==
For many years De Barros supported himself by working at Banco do Brasil.

In 1946 and 1947, De Barros began to explore photography.

In 1948, he co-founded Grupo XV, which was a collective of mostly Japanese painters interested in exploring Post-Impressionist art. In 1948, De Barros was introduced to the concepts of Gestalt theory, where he focused heavily on form, by the critic Mário Pedrosa. He was also influenced at the time by Paul Klee, Wassily Kandinsky, and the Bauhaus movement in relation to industrial design.

In 1949, he started a photography lab with his friend Athaíde de Barros and Thomaz Farkas, and, with the intention of deepening his knowledge, he joined the Foto Cine Clube Bandeirante in São Paulo, a group of artists who focused on pictorialism. Artists in this group included German Lorca, José Yalenti, Thomaz Farkas, among others. During this time, De Barros studied photographic experimental practices from Europe and United States in the work of Moholy-Nagy and Man Ray.

In 1949, De Barros began teaching and organized the photography laboratory of the São Paulo Museum of Art (MASP).

In 1950, De Barros held Fotoformas at the Museu de Arte de São Paulo, an exhibition which represented a new era in the process of photography in Brazil. The title was influenced by Gestalt theory.

In 1951, received a scholarship from the French government, and taking a one-year leave from his job at Banco do Brasil, he went to Paris to study lithography at the National Superior School of Fine Arts and engraving at Stanley William Hayter's atelier. He went on to attend the Ulm School of Design in Ulm, Germany, where he studied graphic arts with Otl Aicher and met Max Bill. At this point he abandoned his work in photography to focus on concrete art.

In 1952, De Barros co-founded Grupo Ruptura with Judith Lauand, Luiz Sacilotto, Lothar Charoux, Waldemar Cordeiro, among others. He was involved in writing the manifesto that outlined abstract and concrete art.

De Barros founded the photography group called Escola Paulista.

In 1954, De Barros founded with Frei João Batista a cooperative furniture design company called Unilabor, which was successful and allowed him to leave his job at Banco do Brasil.

In 1964, De Barros went on to found in association with Aloísio Bione another furniture design company called Hobjeto. Both Unilabor and Hobjeto went bankrupt due to the political instability and economic hardship of the time.

In the 1960s, De Barros worked with Nelson Leirner, putting on pop art events, often including outdoor advertisements that had been removed, re-worked, and replaced in the street.

In 1966, De Barros, founded Galeria Rex with Carlos Fajardo, Frederico Nasser, José Rezende Filho, Nelson Leiner, and Wesley Duke Lee as an experiment in the art market and selling art. Although the gallery closed after a year, the Grupo Rex and the work of the group continued for over 12 years.

In 1977, De Barros returned to geometric art and concepts of concrete art, using Formica as his base material in further exploring industrial design.

Geraldo abandoned photography for over 30 years, devoting himself to focus on arts and design.

In 1996, his daughter put together an exhibit of photographs from his archive that was held at Musée de l'Elysée in Lausanne, Switzerland, which led to an interest in De Barros' early work in photography.

In 1996, after suffering several brain ischemia and with his motor functions totally debilitated, he resumed working in photography, and with the help of his assistant, the photographer Ana Moraes, made a last series of 250 works called "Sobras."

It wasn't until 1998 that De Barros' work was exhibited in the United States, at Sicardi-Sanders Gallery in Houston, Texas.

== Death ==
De Barros died on April 17, 1998, in São Paulo at the age of 75.

== Legacy ==
Following his death, the legacy of De Barros' work led to an increased coverage and academic and art history-based awareness of his importance and impact as a central figure in Brazil's recent art history. Retrospectives were held in Europe and North America.

== Documentary ==
In 1999, a documentary on De Barros directed by Michel Favre called Geraldo de Barros: Sobras em Obras was released. The film was produced by De Barros' daughter, Fabiana de Barros.

== Awards ==
- 1952: Forth Centenary of the São Paulo City, Brazil, First Prize for Graphic Design
- 1953: II Bienal de São Paulo, Brazil, Acquisition Award
- 1967: IX Bienal Internacional de São Paulo, Brazil, Acquisition Award
- 1991: XXI Bienal Internacional de São Paulo, Brazil, Second Prize

== Selected exhibitions ==
=== Selected group exhibitions ===
- 1951: I Bienal Internacional de Arte de São Paulo (São Paulo)
- 1953: II Bienal Internacional de Arte de São Paulo (São Paulo)
- 1955: "Incisioni e disegni Brasíliani", Villa Ciani (Lugano)
- 1956: XXVIII Biennale di Venezia (Venice)
- 1960: "konkrete kunst. 50 jahre entwicklung", Helmhaus (Zurich) – traveling exhibition
- 1967: IX Bienal Internacional de Arte de São Paulo (São Paulo)
- 1967: "Nova objectividade brasileira", Museu de Arte Moderna do Rio de Janeiro (Rio de Janeiro)
- 1977: Projeto construtivo brasileiro na arte
- 1950–1962: Museu de Arte Moderna do Rio de Janeiro (Rio de Janeiro); Pinacoteca do Estado de São Paulo (São Paulo)
- 1979: XV Bienal Internacional de Arte de São Paulo (São Paulo)
- 1986: XLII Biennale di Venezia (Venice)
- 1991: XXI Bienal Internacional de Arte de São Paulo (São Paulo)
- 1992: "Brasilien. Entdeckung und Selbstentdeckung", Kunsthaus Zürich (Zurich)
- 1999: "Brasilianische Fotografie 1946–1998. Labirinto e Identidades", Kunstmuseum Wolfsburg (Wolfsburg)
- 2000: "Heterotopías. Medio siglo sin lugar. 1918–1968", Museo Nacional Centro de Arte Reina Sofía (Madrid)
- 2000: "Século 20. Arte do Brasil", Fundação Calouste Gulbenkian, Centro de Arte Moderna José de Azeredo Perdigão (Lisbon)
- 2000–2002: "Brasil 1920–1950. De la antropofagia a Brasília", Institut Valencià d’Art Modern, Centre Julio González (Valencia); Museu de Arte Brasileira (São Paulo)
- 2002: "Grupo Ruptura. Arte concreta paulista. Revisitando a exposição inaugural", Maria Antônia University Center of University of São Paulo (São Paulo)
- 2003: "Cuasi-corpus. Arte concreto y neoconcreto de Brasil", Museo de Arte Contemporáneo Internacional Rufino Tamayo (Mexico City); Museo de Arte Contemporáneo (Monterrey)
- 2006: "Cruce de miradas. Visiones de América Latina. Colección Patricia Phelps de Cisneros", Museo del Palacio de Bellas Artes (Mexico City)
- 2006: "The Sites of Latin American Abstraction", Cisneros Fontanals Art Foundation (Miami, Florida) – traveling exhibition
- 2007: "Desenho construtivista brasileiro", Museu de Arte Moderna do Rio de Janeiro (Rio de Janeiro)
- 2007: "The Geometry of Hope. Latin American Abstract Art from the Patricia Phelps de Cisneros Collection", Blanton Museum of Art, The University of Texas at Austin (Austin, Texas); Grey Art Gallery, New York University (New York)
- 2007-08: "New Perspectives in Latin American Art, 1930–2006: Selections from a Decade of Acquisitions", Museum of Modern Art (New York) – November 21, 2007 – February 25, 2008
- 2008: "Diálogo concreto – Design e construtivismo no Brasil", Caixa Cultural (Rio de Janeiro)
- 2009: "Foto Cine Clube Bandeirante. 70 Anos", Centro Cultural São Paulo (São Paulo)
- 2009: "Experimentaciones. La experiencia concreta y neoconcreta en la fotografía brasileña", Museo de Arte Contemporáneo Parque Forestal y Espacio ArteAbierto de Fundación Itaú (Santiago) – traveling exhibition
- 2010: "Moderna para sempre. Fotografia modernista brasileira na Coleção Itaú", Museu de Arte do Rio Grande do Sul Ado Malagoli (Porto Alegre)
- 2010: "Vibración. Moderne Kunst aus Lateinamerika. The Ella Fontanals-Cisneros Collection", Bundeskunsthalle (Bonn)
- 2010: "Constructive Spirit. Abstract Art in South and North America, 1920s–50s", Newark Museum (Newark, New Jersey); Amon Carter Museum (Fort Worth, Texas)

=== Selected solo exhibitions ===
- 1950: "Fotoformas", Museu de Arte de São Paulo Assis Chateaubriand (São Paulo)
- 1965: Museo de Arte Moderno (Buenos Aires) [catalogue]
- 1976: "12 anos de pintura, 1964 a 1976", Museu de Arte Moderna de Sao Paulo (São Paulo) [catalogue]
- 1987: Tschudi Galerie (Glarus, Switzerland) [brochure]
- 1993: "Peintre et photographe", Musée de l’Elysée (Lausanne)
- 1994: "Fotógrafo", Museu da Imagem e do Som (São Paulo) [catalogue]
- 1996: "Precursor", Centro Cultural Banco do Brasil (Rio de Janeiro) [catalogue]
- 1999: MMA Collection, Museu de Arte Moderna do Rio de Janeiro (Rio de Janeiro) [catalogue]
- 1999–2000: "Fotoformas", Museum Ludwig (Cologne); SESC Pompéia (São Paulo); Musée de l’Elysée (Lausanne) [catalogue]
- 2001: "Geraldo de Barros and Lygia Pape", Americas Society (New York) [catalogue]
- 2005: "Javier Pérez. Geraldo de Barros", Galerie Guy Bärtschi (Geneva)
- 2006: "Fotoformas. Fotografías – Photographies", Museu da Imagem e do Som (São Paulo) [catalogue]
- 2008: "Free, Freed and Freeing", Sicardi Gallery (Houston, Texas) [catalogue]
- 2013: "Fotoformas" / "Sobras", The Photographers' Gallery (London)

== Selected works ==
- Abstraction, São Paulo at the Museum of Modern Art (1949)
- Abstraction, São Paulo at the Museum of Modern Art (1949)
- Fotoforma, São Paulo at the Museum of Modern Art (1949)
- Self Portrait at the Museum of Modern Art (1949)
- Mouvement giratoire at Museum of Fine Arts, Houston (1949)
- São Paulo, Brazil, Neg. 50 at Museum of Fine Arts, Houston (1949)
- São Paulo, Brazil at the Museum of Modern Art (1948–50)
- Diagonal Function at the Museum of Modern Art (1952)
- Concreto at Museum of Fine Arts, Houston (1953)
- Cartaz para o IV Centenário de São Paulo at Museum of Fine Arts, Houston (1954)

== Selected publications ==
- De Barros, Geraldo (1987). Geraldo de Barros (Exhibition catalog). Glarus: Galerie Tschudi. OCLC 960417819. – 5. September bis 10. Oktober 1987, Galerie Tschudi, Glarus
- De Barros, Geraldo (1996). Geraldo de Barros: Precursor (Exhibition catalog) (in Portuguese and English). Rio de Janeiro: Centro Cultural Banco do Brasil. OCLC 45777044. – Catálogo de exposição 25 de janeiro a 24 de março de 1996
- De Barros, Geraldo (1999). Misselbeck, Reinhold (ed.). Geraldo de Barros: Fotoformas (1923–1998) (Exhibition catalog). München: Prestel. ISBN 978-3-791-32189-9. OCLC 43268241. – Published on the occasion of the exhibition "Geraldo de Barros: Fotoformas", held at Museum Ludwig, Köln, (26.8.1999 - 25.1.2000); SESC Pompeia, Sao Paulo, (3.11.-3.12.1999); Musée de l'Elysée, Lausanne (July–Sept. 2000)
- De Barros, Geraldo; Peres, Adon (essay by) (2001). Geraldo De Barros (Exhibition catalog). New York: Americas Society. ISBN 978-1-879-12823-1. OCLC 58757895. – Published in conjunction with an exhibition organized by the Americas Society as part of "Forma: Brazil series" held from March 20 – May 6, 2001
- De Barros, Geraldo; Fernandes Jr., Rubens (2006). Geraldo de Barros: Sobras + Fotoformas (in Portuguese, English, and French). São Paulo: Cosac Naify. ISBN 978-8-575-03502-3. OCLC 162101708.
- De Barros, Geraldo; Fernando, Castro R. (2008). Geraldo De Barros: Free, Freed and Freeing (Exhibition catalog). Houston, TX: Sicard Gallery. OCLC 612383143. – Published on the occasion of the exhibition, "Geraldo de Barros", which took place at the Sicard Gallery in Houston Texas from May 28 – July 5, 2008
- De Barros, Geraldo (2006). Girardin, Daniel (ed.). Geraldo De Barros: Fotoformas-Sobras: 195 Photographs (Exhibition catalog) (in English and French). London: Photographers' Gallery. ISBN 978-2-970-07027-6. OCLC 841176110. – Published on the occasion of the exhibition "Geraldo de Barros: What Remains", held at the Photographers' Gallery, London, 17 January - 7 September 2013
- De Barros, Geraldo; De Barros, Fabiana (2013). Geraldo de Barros: Isso (Exhibition catalog) (in Portuguese and English). São Paulo: Edições SESC SP. ISBN 978-8-579-95055-1. OCLC 890490179. – Published on the occasion of the exhibition "Geraldo de Barros: Jogos de Dados e Sobras (1980–1990)" held 11 July - 8 Sept., 2013 at Sesc Vila Mariana in São Paulo
