= The Thrilling Game Related to Photography =

- Artist: Kansuke Yamamoto
- Year: 1956
- Medium: Photograph, gelatin silver print on paper and glass on paper
- Dimensions: 25.9 cm × 19.9 cm × 7.4 cm
- Location: Nottingham
- Owner: Jack Kirkland Collection

The Thrilling Game Related to Photography is a 1956 mixed-media photographic work by the Japanese artist Kansuke Yamamoto. Combining a photograph with glass, it is one of the three-dimensional works Yamamoto began making in the mid-1950s. The work was later exhibited at Tate Modern in Shape of Light: 100 Years of Photography and Abstract Art (2018).

== Description ==
Tate's large-print guide for Shape of Light lists the work as a "Photograph, gelatin silver print on paper and glass on paper" and gives its dimensions as 25.9 × 19.9 × 7.4 cm. A checklist for Yamamoto's 2017 exhibition at Taka Ishii Gallery Photography / Film likewise describes it as a 1956 work in gelatin silver print and glass.

== History ==
According to the Getty chronology for Yamamoto, he began making three-dimensional work in 1956 and held solo exhibitions that year at Matsushima Gallery in Ginza and Maruzen Gallery in Nagoya. The Thrilling Game Related to Photography was shown in Yamamoto's 1956 solo exhibition, and a review in the Asahi Shimbun described the exhibition as comprising more than thirty colour and black-and-white works. The newspaper singled out The Thrilling Game Related to Photography as an experimental work using glass, curved surfaces, and pins, and saw the exhibition as a whole as an attempt to break with older conventions of photography.

The work was exhibited again in the 2017 Taka Ishii Gallery Photography / Film exhibition Kansuke Yamamoto. It was later included in Tate Modern's 2018 exhibition Shape of Light: 100 Years of Photography and Abstract Art, which Tate presented as a survey of the relationship between photography and abstract art from the 1910s to the present.

== Reception ==
Reviewing the 2017 Taka Ishii exhibition, Kōtarō Iizawa grouped the work with Metamorphosis as an example of Yamamoto's combination of photography and objects, and discussed it alongside serial works such as It is Raining in Town My Room Is Full of Fragments and My Thin-Aired Room.

In a 2018 review of Shape of Light, Fred S. Fyles described the work as a small box containing a photograph of glass shards pierced with the shards themselves, and argued that it served as an emblem for the exhibition as a whole by collapsing distinctions between sculpture, art, and photography while retaining a strong sense of playfulness.
