= Judith Lauand =

Brazilian painter and printmaker (1922–2022)

- Born: 26 May 1922; Pontal, São Paulo, Brazil
- Died: 9 December 2022 (aged 100); São Paulo, Brazil
- Other names: Dama do Concretismo; First Lady of Concretism
- Education: Escola de Belas Artes
- Known for: painter, printmaker
- Movement: Brazilian modernist art, abstract art, concrete art

Judith Lauand (26 May 1922 – 9 December 2022) was a Brazilian painter and printmaker. She is considered a pioneer of the Brazilian modernist movement that started in the 1950s, and was the only female member of the concrete art movement based in São Paulo, the Grupo Ruptura.

== Early life and education ==
Lauand was born in Pontal, São Paulo, Brazil, to a Lebanese father and Syrian mother.

In the mid-1950s, Lauand graduated from the Escola de Belas Artes in Araraquara, São Paulo in Brazil with a degree in fine arts. While at Escola de Belas Artes, Lauand's education was based in traditional fine arts. Domênico Lazzarini and Maria Ybarra de Almeida taught her painting and Lívio Abramo taught her printmaking.

== Career ==
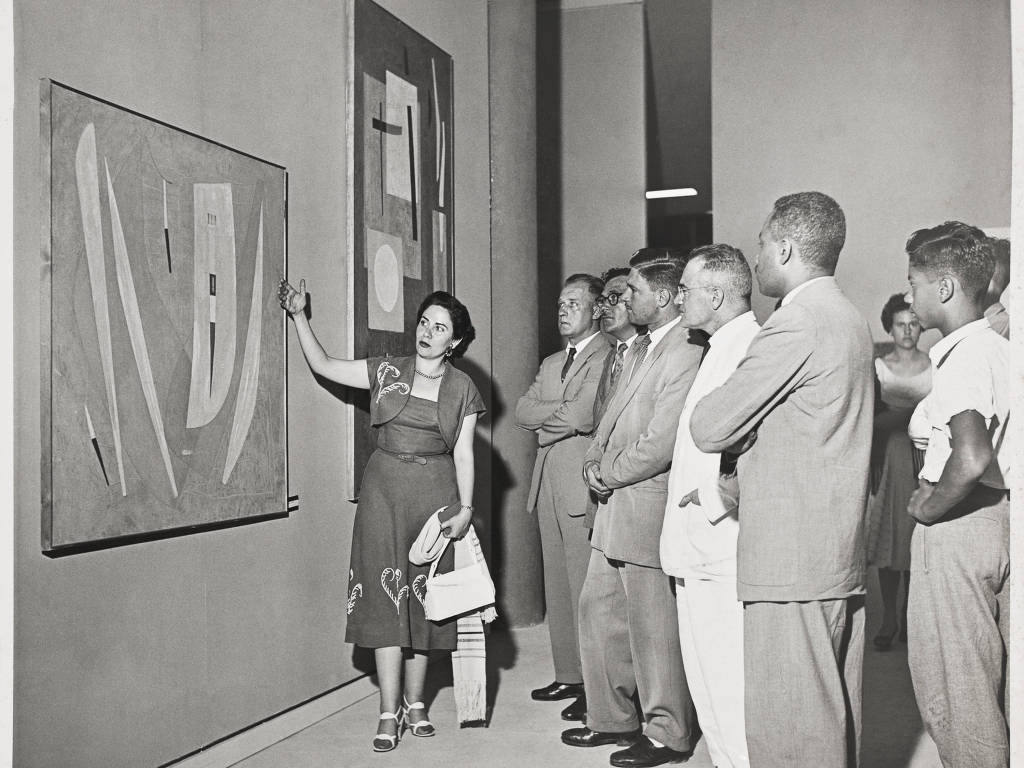
Lauand as a gallery monitor in 1954

After graduating from college, Lauand worked as a teacher in Araraquara and produced artwork on the side, which at that time was in the style of expressionist figurative paintings.

In 1953, Lauand moved to São Paulo. In 1954, she worked as a gallery monitor at the São Paulo Art Biennial, which led to her connecting with fellow artists who were part of the concrete art movement, Grupo Ruptura: Anatol Władysław, Geraldo de Barros, Leopoldo Haar, Lothar Charoux, Luís Sacilotto, Kazmer Féjer, and Waldemar Cordeiro. Lauand soon joined the group, becoming their only female member.

Lauand's work is rooted in the abstract art from the 1950s, with a movement in 1954 to a more rigid and analytical approach. Starting in the 1960s, Lauand began incorporating non-traditional materials like paper clips and other items into her pieces, making the surfaces uneven and creating different effects.

Lauand was the only artist among her contemporaries who signed her paintings, and signed on the front of the painting. This was seen as a more traditional approach, and was a rejection of the theoretical aesthetic of what other artists were doing.

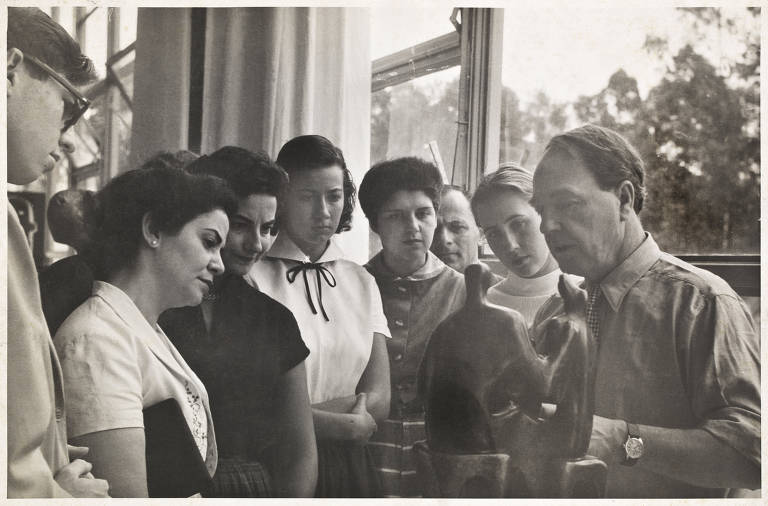
Lauand (left) at a workshop of Henry Moore (right) in 1953

Lauand worked across many different mediums. As a painter, she created works using acrylic, enamel, oil, and tempera paints, incorporating gouaches and/or collages. Lauand's output also took the form of embroidery, sculptures, woodcuts, and tapestries.

== Death ==
Lauand turned 100 on 26 May 2022, and died in São Paulo on 9 December.

== Selected exhibitions ==
Group exhibitions

- 1956: "Exposicão Nacional de Arte Concreta." Museu de Arte Moderna (São Paulo)
- 1960: "Konkrete Kunst." 50 Jahre Entwicklung, Helmhaus (Zurich) [traveling exhibition]
- 1965: VIII Bienal Internacional de Arte de São Paulo (São Paulo)
- 1967: IX Bienal Internacional de Arte de São Paulo (São Paulo)
- 1969: X Bienal Internacional de Arte de São Paulo (São Paulo)
- 1977: "Projeto construtivo brasileiro na arte. 1950–1962." Museu de Arte Moderna do Rio de Janeiro (Rio de Janeiro); Pinacoteca do Estado de São Paulo (São Paulo)
- 1984: "Tradição e ruptura." Sãntese de arte e cultura brasileras, Fundação Bienal de São Paulo (São Paulo)
- 1994: Bienal Brasil Século XX (São Paulo) [traveling exhibition]
- 1997: I Bienal de Artes Visuais do Mercosul (Porto Alegre)
- 2003: "Cuasi-corpus. Arte concreto y neoconcreto de Brasil." Museo de Arte Contemporáneo Internacional Ruãno Tamayo (Mexico City); Museo de Arte Contemporáneo (Monterrey)
- 2006: "The Sites of Latin American Abstraction." Cisneros Fontanals Art Foundation (Miami, Florida) [traveling exhibition]
- 2007: "The Geometry of Hope. Latin American Abstract Art from the Patricia Phelps de Cisneros Collection." Blanton Museum of Art, The University of Texas at Austin (Austin, Texas); Grey Art Gallery, New York University (New York)
- 2007: "Desenho construtivista brasileiro." Museu de Arte Moderna do Rio de Janeiro (Rio de Janeiro)
- 2009: "Geometric Abstract Works. The Latin American Vision from the 1950s, 60s and 70s." Henrique Faria Fine Art (New York)
- 2010: "Then & Now. Abstraction in Latin American Art from 1950 to Present." 60 Wall Gallery, Deutsche Bank (New York)
- 2010: "Vibración. Moderne Kunst aus Lateinamerika." The Ella Fontanals-Cisneros Collection, Bundeskunsthalle (Bonn)
- 2017–2018: "Making Art Concrete: Works from Argentina and Brazil in the Colección Patricia Phelps de Cisneros." Getty Center (Los Angeles, California) (29 August 2017 – 11 February 2018)

Solo exhibitions

- 1954: Galeria Ambiente (São Paulo)
- 1965: Galeria Novas Tendências (São Paulo)
- 1977: Museu de Arte Contemporânea da Universidade de São Paulo (São Paulo)
- 1984: "Geometria 84." Paulo Figueiredo Galeria de Arte (São Paulo)
- 1992: "Efemérides." Museu de Arte Contemporânea da Universidade de São Paulo (São Paulo)
- 1996: "Obras de 1954–1960." Galeria Sylvio Nery (São Paulo) [catalogue]
- 2007: "50 anos de pintura." Galeria Berenice Arvani (São Paulo)
- 2008: "65 anos arte." Galeria Berenice Arvani (São Paulo); Secretaria de Cultura, Araraquara (São Paulo)
- 2011: "Judith Lauand: Experiências." Museu de Arte Moderna de São Paulo (20 January – 3 April 2011)
- 2013: "Judith Lauand: The 1950s." Stephen Friedman Gallery (London)
- 2014–2015: "Judith Lauand: Brazilian Modernist, 1950s-2000s," Driscoll Babcock Galleries (New York, NY) (23 October 2014 – 10 January 2015)
- 2017: "Judith Lauand: Brazilian Concrete Abstractions," Driscoll Babcock Galleries (New York, NY) (15 June – 28 July 2017)
- 2022–2023: "Judith Lauand: desvio concreto" (Concrete Deviation), São Paulo Museum of Art (MASP) (25 November 2022 – 2 April 2023)

== Awards and honors ==
- 1945: 9th Salão de Belas Artes de Araraquara, Prêmio Estímulo de Desenho
- 1952: 15th Salão de Belas Artes de Araraquara, Primeiro Lugar
- 1953: 16th Salão de Belas Artes de Araraquara, Prêmio Cidade de Araraquara
- 1954: 3rd Salão Paulista de Arte Moderna, Grande Medalha de Bronze
- 1955: 4th Salão Paulista de Arte Moderna, Pequena Medalha de Prata
- 1958: 7th Salão Paulista de Arte Moderna, Prêmio Aquisição
- 1959: 8th Salão Paulista de Arte Moderna, Prêmio Aquisição
- 1964: 13th Salão Paulista de Arte Moderna, Prêmio Aquisição

== Works and publications ==
- Lauand, Judith; Herkenhoff, Paulo (essay by); Nery da Fonseca, Sylvio (1996). Judith Lauand, obras de 1954-1960 (Exhibition catalog) (in Portuguese). São Paulo: Sylvio Nery da Fonseca, Escritória de Arte. OCLC 68738608. – de 19 de novembro (terça-feira) a 17 de dezembro de 1996
- Lauand, Judith; Arvani, Berenice (coordenação); Fioravanti, Celso (curadoria e texto) (2007). Judith Lauand: 50 anos de pintura (Exhibition catalog) (in Portuguese and English). São Paulo: Galeria Berenice Arvani. OCLC 427897490. – Catalog of an exhibition held 2 Aug. – 10 September 2007 at the Galeria Berenice Arvani in São Paulo, Brazil
- Lauand, Judith; Klein, Antônio Paulo (curadoria) (2008). Judith Lauand: 65 anos arte: Xilogravuras (Exhibition catalog) (in Portuguese). São Paulo: Galeria Berenice Arvani. OCLC 965763237. – Catalog of an exhibition held 4 November – 12 December 2008 at Prefeitura Municipal de Araraquara; and 2 December 2008 – 16 January 2009 at Galeria Berenice Arvani, São Paulo
- Lauand, Judith; Fioravanti, Celso (curadoria); Villela, Milú (2011). Judith Lauand: Experiências (Exhibition catalog) (in Portuguese and English). São Paulo: Museu de Arte Moderna. ISBN 978-8-586-87150-4. OCLC 716123474. – Catalog of an exhibition held at Museu de Arte Moderna de São Paulo, 21 Jan. – 3 April 2011
- Lauand, Judith; Fioravante, Celso (essay by) (2013). Judith Lauand: The 1950s (Exhibition catalog) (in English and Portuguese). London: Stephen Friedman Gallery. OCLC 879310062. – Catalog of an exhibition held 8 February – 9 March 2013 in London
- Lauand, Judith; Edelman, Aliza (essay by); Driscoll, John (introduction by) (2014). Judith Lauand: Brazilian Modernist, 1950s-2000s (Exhibition catalog). New York: Driscoll Babcock Galleries. ISBN 978-0-989-80623-7. OCLC 894358338. – Catalog of an exhibition held at Driscoll Babcock Galleries from 23 October – 20 December 2014
- Lauand, Judith (2015). Os anos 50 Judith Lauand e a construção da geometria (Exhibition catalog) (in Portuguese). São Paulo: Instituto de Arte Contemporânea.
- Lauand, Judith; Edelman, Aliza (essay by) (2017). Judith Lauand: Brazilian Concrete Abstractions (Exhibition catalog). New York: Driscoll Babcock Galleries.
