= Ipu, Ceará =

Municipality in Ceará, Brazil

Coordinates: 4°19′19″S 40°42′39″W

Ipú
- Municipality
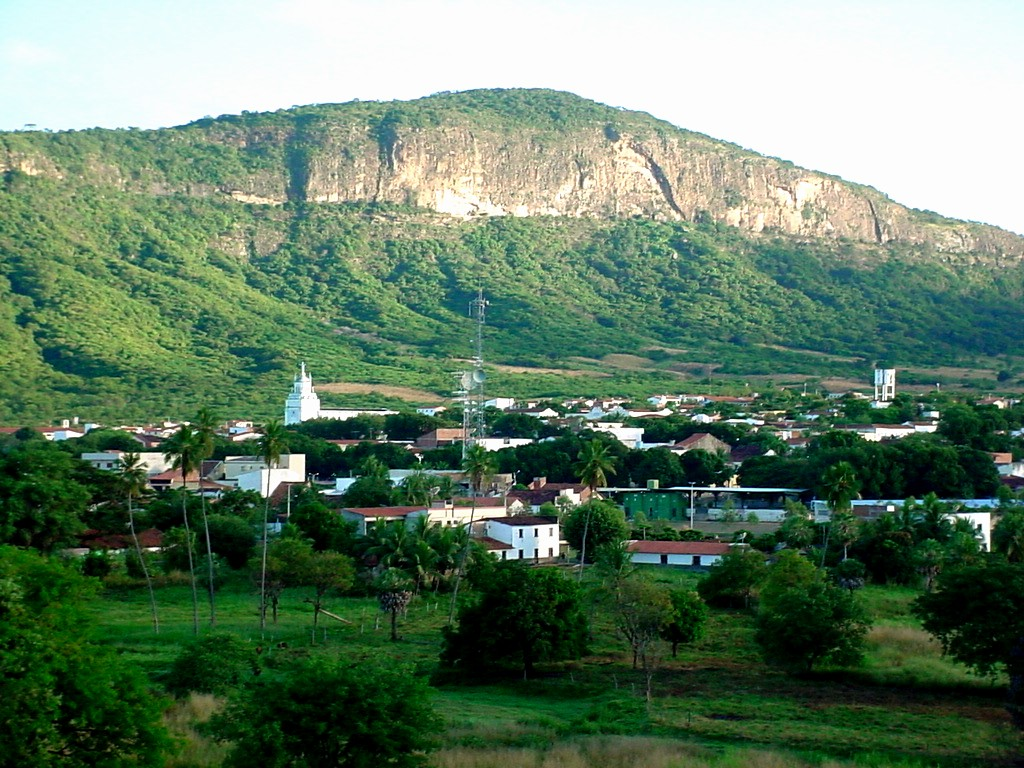
- View of Ipu, Ceará

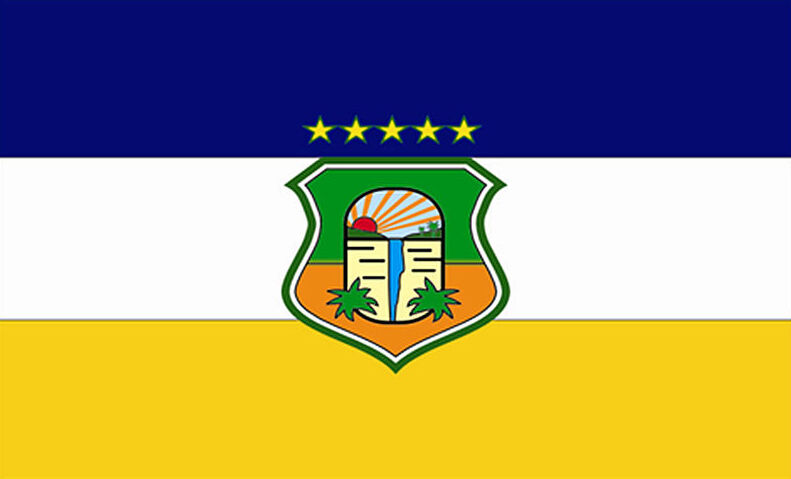
- Flag
- Interactive map of Ipú
- Country: Brazil
- Region: Nordeste
- State: Ceará
- Mesoregion: Noroeste Cearense

Population (2020)
  - Total: 42,058
- Time zone: UTC−3 (BRT)

Ipú is a municipality in the state of Ceará in the Northeast region of Brazil.

== See also ==
- List of municipalities in Ceará
