= Colonel Delmiro Gouveia =

1978 film

- Theatrical release poster
- Directed by: Geraldo Sarno
- Written by: Geraldo Sarno; Orlando Senna
- Produced by: Marco Altberg; Thomas Farkas; Geraldo Sarno
- Starring: Rubens de Falco
- Cinematography: Lauro Escorel
- Edited by: Amaury Alves
- Music by: J. Lins
- Production company: Saruê Filmes
- Distributed by: Embrafilme
- Release date: 6 July 1978
- Running time: 90 minutes
- Country: Brazil
- Language: Portuguese

Colonel Delmiro Gouveia (Portuguese: Coronel Delmiro Gouveia) is a 1978 Brazilian drama film directed by Geraldo Sarno. It was screened in the Un Certain Regard section at the 1978 Cannes Film Festival. The film accounts the story and exploits of "colonel" Delmiro Gouveia, one of the earliest industrial entrepreneurs of Brazil, founder of the Corrente factories.

== Cast ==
- Rubens de Falco as Delmiro Gouveia
- Sura Berditchevsky as Eulina
- Nildo Parente as Lionello Lona
- Joffre Soares as Ulisses Luna
- José Dumont as Zé Pó
- Magalhães Graça as Dantas Barreto
- Conceição Senna as Zé Pó's wife
- Alvaro Freire as Isidoro
- Maria Alves as Jove
- Dennis Bourke as Mister Hallam
- Harildo Deda as Zé Rodrigues
- Maria Adélia as Augustas
- Henrique Almeida as Osvaldo
- João Gama as station master
