= Alice Brill =

Brazilian photographer (1920–2013)

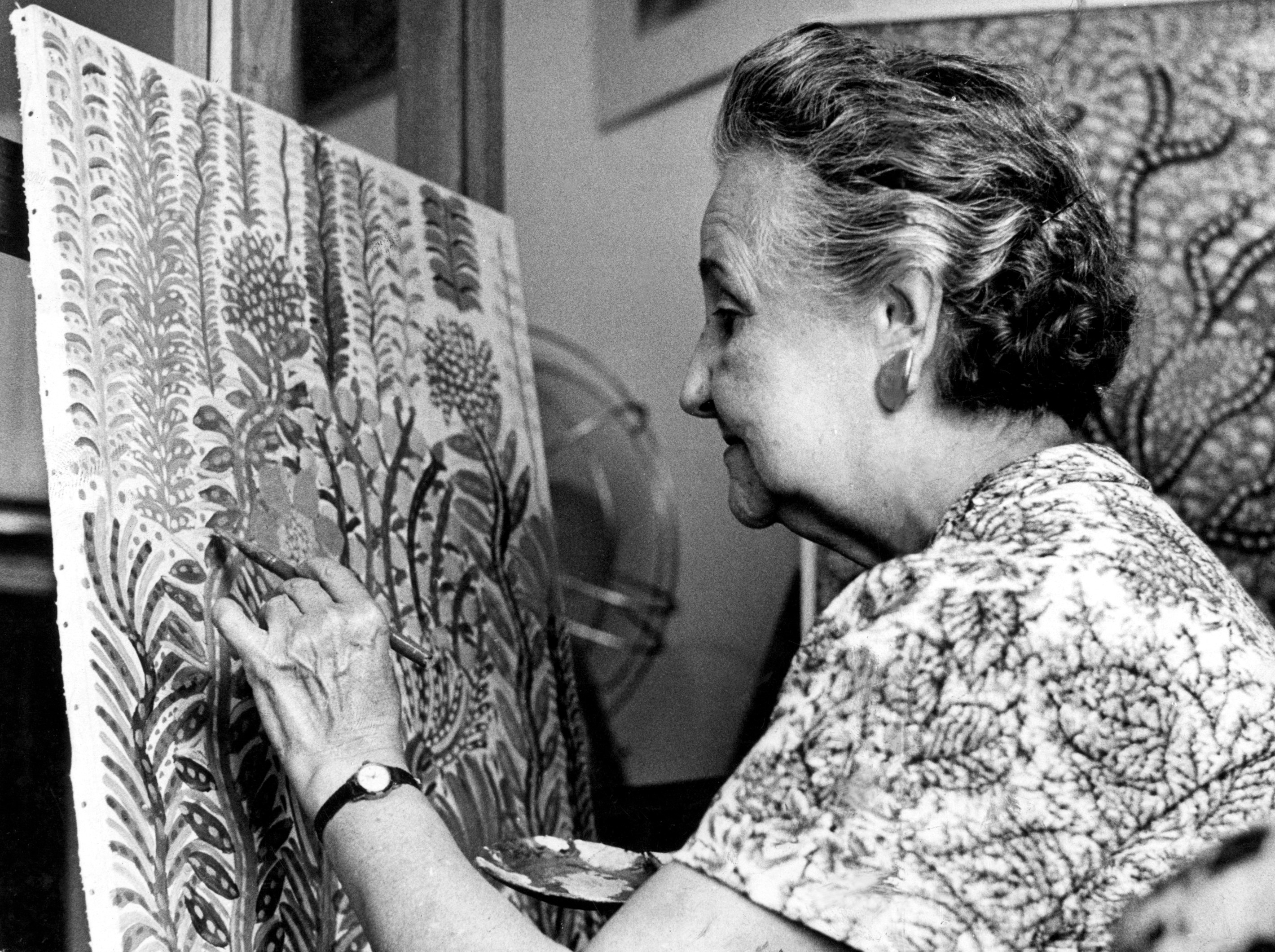
- Brill in 1965
- Born: Alice Brill Czapski; December 13, 1920; Cologne, Germany
- Died: June 29, 2013 (aged 92); Itu, Brazil

Alice Brill (December 13, 1920 – June 29, 2013) was a German-born Brazilian photographer, painter, and art critic.

== Life and career ==
Alice Brill Czapski was born in Cologne, Germany, in 1920. She was Jewish, the daughter of the painter Erich Brill and the journalist Martha Brill. In 1934 she and her parents left Germany to escape the National Socialist (Nazi) regime; her mother, long divorced from Erich Brill, emigrated to Brazil, and in 1935 Alice Brill and her father also emigrated there. Influenced by a schoolteacher, she recorded in a diary the trips made during exile, with a photographic camera given to her by her father. She passed through Spain, Italy and the Netherlands before landing in Brazil. Her father returned alone to Germany in 1936. He was subsequently imprisoned and died, a Holocaust victim, in 1942 at the Jungfernhof concentration camp.

At age 16 she studied with the painter Paulo Rossi Osir, who influenced her production of photographs and batik paintings. She participated in the Santa Helena Group, an informal association of painters from São Paulo, maintaining contact with artists such as Mario Zanini and Alfredo Volpi. In 1946, she won a Hillel Foundation scholarship to study at the University of New Mexico and the Art Students League of New York where she studied photography, painting, sculpture, engraving, art history, philosophy and literature.

After returning to Brazil in 1948, she worked as a photographer for Habitat magazine, coordinated by architect Lina Bo Bardi. She documented architecture, fine arts and made portraits of artists, as well as recording works and exhibitions of the São Paulo Art Museum and Sao Paulo Museum of Modern Art He also participated in an expedition in Corumbá organized by the Central Brazil Foundation, photographing the Carajás people. In 1950, she performed the essay at the Psychiatric Hospital of Juqueri at the invitation of the plastic artist Maria Leontina da Costa, registering the wing of the Free Art Workshop. In the same year, Pietro Maria Bardi commissioned an essay on São Paulo for the city's fourth centennial. It portrayed the process of modernization of the city between 1953 and 1954, but the publication project was not completed.

In addition to being a photographer, she worked as a painter, participating in the I and IX Bienal de São Paulo (1951 and 1967 respectively), as well as several individual and collective exhibitions. Her subjects involved urban landscapes and abstractionism, performing watercolors and batik paintings. She graduated in philosophy from PUC-SP in 1976, graduating in 1982 and a doctorate in 1994 and worked as an art critic, writing articles for the culture section of the newspaper O Estado de S. Paulo, which were later collected in the book "Da arte e da linguagem"(Perspectiva, 1988).

== Writings ==
- Da arte e da linguagem (Perspectiva, 1988)
- Mario Zanini e seu tempo (Perspectiva, 1984)
- Flexor (Edusp, 1990)
