= German Lorca =

Brazilian photographer (1922–2021)

- Born: 28 May 1922; São Paulo, First Brazilian Republic
- Died: 8 May 2021 (aged 98); São Paulo, Brazil
- Occupation: Photographer

German Lorca (28 May 1922 – 8 May 2021) was a Brazilian photographer.

== Biography ==
Lorca studied accounting at the Liceu Acadêmico de São Paulo. He started his own accounting business in 1952. However, his interest in photography led him to a group of photographers in 1959, called Foto Cine Clube Bandeirante. This club included the likes of Thomaz Farkas and Chico Albuquerque. In 1954, he was official photographer of the celebration of the 400th anniversary of São Paulo.

In 2006, a retrospective titled Pinacoteca I de São Paulo was exhibited in Lorca's honor. In 2018, another retrospective honored 70 years of his photographic career. The Museum of Modern Art possesses several of his photographs today.

German Lorca died in São Paulo on 8 May 2021 at the age of 98.
