= Waldemar Cordeiro =

Brazilian sculptor and theorist

- Born: April 12, 1925; Rome, Italy
- Died: June 30, 1973 (aged 48); São Paulo, Brazil
- Occupations: Visual artist Art critic
- Years active: 1946–1973
- Known for: Concrete art Computer art

Waldemar Cordeiro (April 12, 1924 – June 30, 1973) was an Italian-born Brazilian art critic and artist. He worked as a computer artist in the early days of computer art and was a pioneer of the concrete art movement in Latin America.

== Early life and education ==
Cordeiro was born in Rome, Italy to a Brazilian father and an Italian mother. He had dual citizenship.

Cordeiro studied at the Accademia di Belle Arti in Rome. At Accademia di Belle Arti, Cordeiro painted in the figurative and expressive art styles. During this time, he began to study the work of Antonio Gramsci, who was deeply influential to his career.

== Career ==
From 1946 through 1948, when he was in his mid-20s, Cordeiro traveled back and forth from Rome and São Paulo, Brazil, before settling permanently in Brazil in 1948. In Brazil, Cordeiro worked as a painter, art critic, and journalist, notably at Folha da Manhã in São Paulo.

Through this work at Folha da Manhã, Cordeiro was the self-appointed leader of the Arte Concrete community, made up of artists who came from diverse immigrant backgrounds, such as Anatol Wladyslaw, Geraldo de Barros, Lothar Charoux, Luiz Sacilotto, Kazmer Fejer and Leopoldo Haar. Cordeiro gathered the artists together as extension of a 1948 exhibition at the Prestes Maia Gallery, where the newly emerging artists had their work first shown.

Initially, Cordeiro painted using a traditionally figurative and expressive style. In the late 1940s, spurred in part by encounters in Rome with the abstraction promoted by the international group known as Art Club (founded by Polish painter Josef Jarema, Italian painter Enrico Prampolini, and others), Cordeiro began to transform forms made up of geometric shapes into a free expression of experimentation with sequences of shapes. Through this work, Cordeiro became known as a pioneer of the concrete art movement in Latin America, specifically Brazil.

In 1952, he co-founded Grupo Ruptura, the Sāo Paulo branch of the Brazilian Concrete art movement. Cordeiro was the group's main theorist. As Grupo Ruptura's main theoretician, he supported the group's rationalist position, openly opposed to the principles put forward by the Rio group led by the art critic Ferreira Gullar. At the Ruptura exhibition in 1952, Cordeiro distributed the Ruptura manifesto, which was seen as a radical statement of the group's intention to reject the old and embrace a new approach that included development of abstractionism, free of all representational references, that would be intelligible no matter viewers' backgrounds. Cordeiro's confrontative approach was informed a rejection of elitism, as many of the artists in Grupo Ruptura as well as Cordeiro himself came from working-class backgrounds and had a focus on the populism expressed by geometric abstractionism as a supposedly universal mode of communication.

In 1953, he met Tomás Maldonado in Buenos Aires.

In 1956, Cordeiro staged the first Exposicão Nacional de Arte Concreta.

From 1957 to 1959, in the series Idéais visíveis, Cordeiro created abstract paintings made up of structural principles and logical concepts.

In 1964, Cordeiro developed a process where he blended the features of pop and concrete art, Augusto de Campos named "pop creto." Corediro then incorporated neo-figurative art.

In 1968, Cordeiro was the first Brazilian artist to work within the field of electronic technology (digital and computer graphic design). He created computer art on the IBM 360/44 with Giorgio Moscati, a physicist at the Physics Department of the University of São Paulo.

In 1971, he organized an international group exhibition showcasing electronic technology, which was a newly emerging artform. This show, "Arteônica," was held at the Museu de Arte Brasileira de la Fundação Armando Alvares Penteado in São Paulo, Brazil.

Additionally, from 1950 to his death in 1973, Cordeiro took part in over 150 landscape design and urban planning projects as a practical application of many of the theories of his work. In a series of critical writings published in the mid-1960s, Cordeiro elaborated his ideas around landscape design "in terms of tensions between the intentionality and planning of the artist-designer, and the 'pragmatic and random' situation" of the person who fulfills, or completes, the work by navigating it.

== Derivatives of an image ==
At the end of the 60's, Cordeiro introduced the computer to his creation system, with "derivatives of an image (1969)", made with Giorgio Moscati, in the IBM 360 of the University of São Paulo, inaugurating with this work the "computer art "in Brazil. His goal was to translate a photographic image into a numerical model, this by means of a computer language. In 1971, Cordeiro uses a photograph of a Vietnamese girl, burned by a napalm bomb, transforming it into thousands of points by the digital process of the computer.

== Arteônica ==
Cordeiro organizes the international exhibition ARTEONICA (1971), in the Armando Alvares Penteado Foundation, in this exhibition highlights the democratizing aspects of the telematics arts, not exploited in that region until the 80's.

According to Cordeiro himself, this project aims to perform interdisciplinary works, taking advantage of the fields of psychology and convergent computing in art.

Through Arteônica, Cordeiro highlighted some problems, such as the way in which works are consumed, mechanical or electronic reproductions, where information tends to be lost and therefore meaningless. "The change of communication is the change of information" says the artist.

Along with the engineer Giorgio Moscati, Cordeiro produced his works "Transformação em Grau Zero / Transformação em Grau 1 / Transformação em Grau 2", which appropriate a poster for Valentine's Day, to build the image, this work is the first of its kind in Brazil (made by a computer).

The computer used was an IBM / 360-44, which was used by Moscati at the University of São Paulo, which performed mathematical operations with a memory of 32 kbytes. The process worked based on a package of punched cards with the program to be executed, which could take hours, days or weeks, depending on the expected result.

== Selected exhibitions ==
=== Selected group exhibitions ===
- 1949: Do figurativismo ao abstraccionismo, Museu de Arte Moderna (São Paulo, Brazil)
- 1951: I Bienal Internacional de Arte de São Paulo (São Paulo, Brazil)
- 1955: III Bienal Internacional de Arte de São Paulo (São Paulo, Brazil)
- 1956: Exposicão Nacional de Arte Concreta
- 1957: IV Bienal Internacional de Arte de São Paulo (São Paulo, Brazil)
- 1959: V Bienal Internacional de Arte de São Paulo (São Paulo, Brazil)
- 1960: Konkrete Kunst. 50 Jahre Entwicklung, Helmhaus, Zurich [traveling exhibition]
- 1961: VI Bienal Internacional de Arte de São Paulo (São Paulo, Brazil)
- 1963: VII Bienal Internacional de Arte de São Paulo (São Paulo, Brazil)
- 1965: VIII Bienal Internacional de Arte de São Paulo (São Paulo, Brazil)
- 1967: IX Bienal Internacional de Arte de São Paulo (São Paulo, Brazil)
- 1967: Nova objectividade brasileira, Museu de Arte Moderna do Rio de Janeiro (Rio de Janeiro, Brazil)
- 1971: "Arteônica," Museu de Arte Brasileira de la Fundação Armando Alvares Penteado (São Paulo, Brazil)
- 1973: XII Bienal Internacional de Arte de São Paulo (São Paulo, Brazil)
- 1975: XIII Bienal Internacional de Arte de São Paulo (São Paulo, Brazil)
- 1977: Projeto construtivo brasileiro na arte. 1950–1962, Museu de Arte Moderna do Rio de Janeiro (Rio de Janeiro, Brazil); Pinacoteca do Estado de São Paulo (São Paulo, Brazil)
- 1984: Tradição e ruptura. Síntese de arte e cultura brasileras, Fundação Bienal de São Paulo (São Paulo, Brazil)
- 1987: Modernidade. Art brésilien du 20e siècle, Musée d'art moderne de la Ville de Paris (Paris, France)
- 1994: Bienal Brasil Século XX (São Paulo, Brazil) [traveling exhibition]
- 1997: I Bienal de Artes Visuais do Mercosul (Porto Alegre, Brazil)
- 1999: Técnica cotidiano/arte, Instituto Itaú Cultural (São Paulo, Brazil)
- 2000: Heterotopías. Medio siglo sin lugar. 1918–1968, Museo Nacional Centro de Arte Reina Sofía (Madrid, Spain)
- 2000: Século 20. Arte do Brasil, Fundação Calouste Gulbenkian, Centro de Arte Moderna José de Azeredo Perdigão (Lisbon, Spain)
- 2002: Grupo Ruptura. Arte concreta paulista. Revisitando a exposição inaugural. Centro Universitário Maria Antonia da Universidade de São Paulo (São Paulo, Brazil)
- 2003: Cuasi-corpus. Arte concreto y neoconcreto de Brasil, Museo de Arte Contemporáneo Internacional Rufino Tamayo, Mexico City; Museo de Arte Contemporáneo, Monterrey
- 2003: Aproximações do espírito pop, 1963–1968. Waldemar Cordeiro, Antonio Dias, Wesley Duke Lee, Nelson Leirner, Museu de Arte Moderna (São Paulo, Brazil)
- 2004: Inverted Utopias. Avant-Garde Art in Latin America, Museum of Fine Arts (Houston, Texas)
- 2005: Visualidades/técnicas. Danilo di Prete, Luiz Sacilotto, Marcello Nitsche, Gilberto Salvador, Waldemar Cordeiro, Instituto Cervantes (São Paulo, Brazil)
- 2005–7: Tropicália. A Revolution in Brazilian Culture (1967–1972), Museum of Contemporary Art, Chicago (Chicago, Illinois); Barbican Art Gallery (London, England); Centro Cultural de Belêm (Lisbon, Spain); The Bronx Museum of the Arts (Bronx, New York)
- 2006: Espaço aberto, espaço fechado. Sites for Sculpture in Modern Brazil, Henry Moore Institute (Leeds, England)
- 2006: The Sites of Latin American Abstraction, Cisneros Fontanals Art Foundation (Miami, Florida) [traveling exhibition]
- 2007: Desenho construtivista brasileiro, Museu de Arte Moderna do Rio de Janeiro (Rio de Janeiro, Brazil)
- 2007: The Geometry of Hope. Latin American Abstract Art from the Patricia Phelps de Cisneros Collection, Blanton Museum of Art, The University of Texas at Austin (Austin, Texas); Grey Art Gallery, New York University (New York, New York)
- 2008: Diálogo concreto – Design e construtivismo no Brasil, Caixa Cultural (Rio de Janeiro, Brazil)
- 2010: Vibración. Moderne Kunst aus Lateinamerika. The Ella Fontanals-Cisneros Collection, Bundeskunsthalle (Bonn, Germany)

=== Selected solo exhibitions ===
- 1959: Galeria de Artes das Folhas (São Paulo, Brazil)
- 1964: Waldemar Cordeiro. Augusto de Campos, Galeria Atrium (São Paulo, Brazil)
- 1965: Museu de Arte Moderna do Rio de Janeiro (Rio de Janeiro, Brazil) [catalogue]
- 1968: Oeuvres 1965–1968, Galerie Debret (Paris, France)
- 1969: Galleria d'Arte della Casa do Brazil (Rome, Italy)
- 1983: Centro Cultural São Paulo (São Paulo, Brazil)
- 1986: Uma aventura da razão, Museu de Arte Contemporânea da Universidade de São Paulo (São Paulo, Brazil) [catalogue]
- 2001: Galeria Brito Cimino (São Paulo, Brazil) [catalogue]
- 2002: Waldemar Cordeiro e a fotografia, Maria Antônia University Center of University of São Paulo (São Paulo, Brazil) [catalogue]
- 2013: "Waldemar Cordeiro: Fantasia Exata," Itaú Cultural – exhibition held from July 4, 2013 to September 22, 2013

== Museums and collections ==
- Fundación Cisneros, Colección Patricia Phelps de Cisneros (Caracas, Venezuela / New York, New York)
- Museu de Arte Contemporânea da Universidade de São Paulo (São Paulo, Brazil)
- Museu de Arte de Brasília, Brasília, Brazil
- Museum of Fine Arts (Houston, Texas)
- Pinacoteca do Estado de São Paulo (São Paulo, Brazil)
- The Ella Fontanals-Cisneros Collection, Cisneros Fontanals Art Foundation (Miami, Florida)

== Memberships ==
- Computer Art Society (London, England) – Cordeiro was first Brazilian to hold membership

== Awards and honors ==
- 1959: Prêmio Leirner de Arte Contemporânea
- 1965: Bienal de São Paulo, Prêmio Itamaraty
- 1967: Bienal de São Paulo, Prêmio Itamaraty

== Selected works ==
- Idéia visível (Visible Idea) at the Museum of Fine Arts, Houston (1956) – Industrial latex paint on plywood laminate panel Wikidata ()
- Derivadas de Uma Imagem (Derivatives of an Image) by Waldemar Cordeiro and Giorgio Moscati. (1969) – First visual computer artwork made in Brazil
- Retrato de Fabiana (Portrait of Fabiana) by Waldemar Cordeiro and Ernesto Vita, Jr. (1970) – sequential work composed of four images
- A Mulher que não ê B.B. (The Woman Who Is Not B.B.) by Waldemar Cordeiro, José Luiz Aguirre and Estevam Roberto Serafim (1971)
- Gente, Grau 1 (People, Degree 1) by Waldemar Cordeiro, Raul Fernando Dada and J. Soares Sobrinho. (1972)
- Gente, Grau 6 (People, Degree 6) by Waldemar Cordeiro, Raul Fernando Dada and J. Soares Sobrinho. (1972)
- Gente Ampli*2 at the Museum of Modern Art (1972) – computer output on paper
- Pirambu by Waldemar Cordeiro, N. Machado and Raul Fernando Dada (1973) – digital printout
- The Woman Who is Not B.B. (A mulher que não é B.B.) at the Museum of Modern Art (1971, printed 1973) – lithograph

== Works and publications ==
- Cordeiro, Waldemar; Sacilotto, Luís (1952). "Manifesto Ruptura" (Offset lithograph). Museum of Fine Arts, Houston.
- Cordeiro, Waldemar. Arteônica. O uso criativo de meios electrônicos nas artes. São Paulo: Universidade de São Paulo, 1972.
- Cordeiro, Waldemar. "Arte analógica e/ou digital," in Arte: Novos Meios/Multimeios. Brasil '70/'80 (São Paulo: Fundação Armando Alvares Penteado, 1985) pp. 191–192.
- Cordeiro, Waldemar. Salão de sombras. Recife: Prefeitura da Cidade do Recife, Secretaria de Educação e Cultura, Conselho Municipal de Cultura, Fundação de Cultura Cidade do Recife, 1992 (Poems)
