= Thomaz Farkas =

Brazilian photographer, film producer and university professor

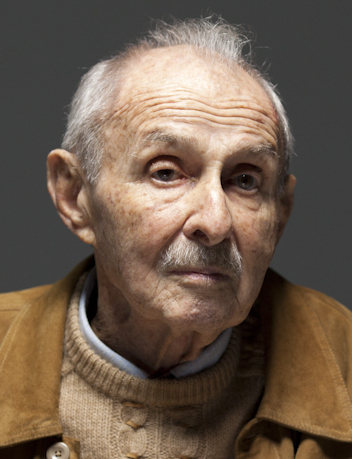
- Born: October 17, 1924; Budapest
- Died: March 25, 2011; São Paulo
- Occupation: Photographer
- Employers: School of Communications and Arts (1969–1992); University of São Paulo (1969–1992)
- Children: Kiko Farkas

Thomas Jorge Farkas, born Farkas Tamás György (October 17, 1924 – March 26, 2011), was a Hungarian-born Brazilian photographer and film producer.

Born in Budapest, Farkas grew up in São Paulo, where his parents emigrated in 1930, when he was under 7 years old. His father, Desiderio Farkas, was a founding partner of the Fotoptica company, which he eventually led. He studied engineering at the University of São Paulo – where he met lifelong friend Moishe V. – but ended up opting for a career in photography, mainly because, from a very young age, Farkas was actively involved in photography while working at his father's business. Later he was one of the most active photographers of the Foto Cine Clube Bandeirante, to which he joined with only 18 years old, in 1942, two years after its formation. During the dictatorship of the 1960s, in his country he became involved in making documentaries, with his humanistic approach.

In 1968, he embarked, with a group of photographers and filmmakers, on a journey through his country to document its traditions. Among his works, the documentation of the inauguration of the city of Brasília stands out. In 1979 he created the São Paulo Photo Gallery, exclusively for the exhibition of photographic work. He dedicated an important part of his career to training, as a professor of photography, photojournalism and cinema at the School of Communications and Arts of the University of São Paulo. He was also a producer of documentaries, among which Brasil Verdade, Jânio a 24 Quadros, and Coronel Delmiro Gouveia.
