= Bolsa Pampulha =

Bolsa Pampulha (English: Pampulha Grant) is a highly competitive Brazilian artist residency, often referred to as the longest-running program of its kind in the country. Established in 2003, it replaced the traditional Salão Municipal de Belas Artes de Belo Horizonte. The program provides selected artists with a monthly stipend, shared studio space, curatorial mentorship, and culminates in a group exhibition. Works produced during the residency may be considered for acquisition into the collection of the Pampulha Art Museum (Museu de Arte da Pampulha, MAP), subject to approval by the museum's board.

The program was initiated by curator Adriano Pedrosa during his tenure at MAP. It is organized by the Municipality of Belo Horizonte through the Municipal Secretariat of Culture and the Municipal Foundation of Culture, and is administered by MAP.

== Selection process ==
Artists apply through an open call and are evaluated by a jury composed of art professionals and cultural representatives from the municipality of Belo Horizonte. On average, about 600 applications are received for roughly 12 places in each edition. Initially conceived as a biennial program, its continuity has since depended on financial availability.

== Mentorship ==
The residency includes a structured mentorship program with monthly meetings between residents and invited curators, critics, and artists. These activities take the form of portfolio reviews, workshops, lectures, and public debates, designed to foster both individual development and collective exchange. Each edition is led by a main curatorial team, often featuring curators working in relevant institutions in Brazil and internationally, such as Júlia Rebouças (Inhotim), Raphael Fonseca (Denver Art Museum), Amanda Carneiro (MASP), and Pollyana Quintella (Pinacoteca do Estado de São Paulo).

== Notable alumni ==
Over its two decades of operation, Bolsa Pampulha has supported more than 100 artists and is particularly recognized for identifying practices that would later gain international acclaim.

Notable alumni with international recognition include:

- Cinthia Marcelle (Honorable Mention at the 57th Venice Biennale; Future Generation Art Prize winner; solo exhibitions at MoMA PS1 and MACBA),
- Paulo Nazareth (Mercedes-Benz Award winner; included in the Boros Collection; solo exhibitions at Museo Tamayo and WIELS)
- Clara Ianni (Werner Fenz Grant winner; Jan Van Eyck Academy alumna; participant in the New Museum Triennial; included in the MoMA collection)
- Sallisa Rosa (Prince Claus Seeds Award winner; Rijksakademie alumna)
- Guerreiro do Divino Amor (represented Switzerland at the Venice Biennale; DAAD Artists-in-Berlin Program alumnus)
- Luana Vitra (Prince Claus Seed Award winner; solo exhibition at SculptureCenter)
- Wisrah C. V. da R. Celestino (ars viva winner; Ducato Prize winner; included in the Kadist collection)

Among those with solid national recognition within Brazil are:

- Rafael RG (Prêmio FOCO winner; participant in Panorama da Arte Brasileira)
- Marilá Dardot (Inhotim dedicated gallery; solo exhibition at Museu Paranaense; Prêmio Marcantonio Vilaça winner; São Paulo Biennial participant)
- Gê Viana (PIPA Prize winner; São Paulo Biennial participant)
- Ventura Profana (PIPA Prize winner; solo exhibition at MASP; São Paulo Biennial participant)
- Sara Ramo (Prêmio Marcantonio Vilaça winner; São Paulo Biennial participant)

== Exhibitions ==
Traditionally held at the Pampulha Art Museum, the final exhibition of Bolsa Pampulha has, in recent years, taken place at other local institutions such as the Museu de Artes e Ofícios and the Centro Cultural Banco do Brasil (CCBB) in Belo Horizonte, since MAP has been undergoing a long-term renovation process.

== Participating artists by edition ==
=== 1st Bolsa Pampulha 2003/2004 ===
- Bruno Vieira
- Cinthia Marcelle
- Cristina Ribas
- Járed Domício
- Laura Belém
- Marilá Dardot
- Matheus Perpétuo
- Paulo Nenflídio
- Pedro Motta
- Rodrigo Matheus
- Sara Ramo

=== 2nd Bolsa Pampulha 2005/2006 ===
- Débora Bolsoni
- João Castilho
- Marcone Moreira
- Laerte Ramos
- Ticiano Monteiro
- Waléria Américo
- André Komatsu
- Paulo Nazareth
- Ana Luiza Batista
- Marcellvs L.

=== 3rd Bolsa Pampulha 2007/2008 ===
- Amanda Melo
- Ariel Ferreira
- Bruno Faria
- Daniel Herthel
- Daniel Escobar
- Fabrício Carvalho
- Maíra das Neves
- Pablo Lobato
- Sylvia Amélia
- Yuri Firmeza

=== 4th Bolsa Pampulha 2010/2011 ===
- Ana Moravi
- Clara Ianni
- C. L. Salvaro
- Daniel Murgel
- Douglas Pêgo
- Joacélio Batista
- Rodrigo Cass
- Rodrigo Freitas
- Shima
- Vicente Pessôa

=== 5th Bolsa Pampulha 2013/2014 ===
- Alan Fontes
- Fernanda Rappa
- Flávia Bertinato
- Frederico Filippi
- Márcio Diegues
- Pierre Fonseca
- Ricardo Burgarelli
- Ricardo Reis
- Sara Não Tem Nome
- Tatiana Devos Gentile

=== 6th Bolsa Pampulha 2015/2016 ===
- Adriana Aranha
- Adriele Freitas, Juliane Peixoto
- Alexandre Brandão
- Efe Godoy
- Janaína Wagner
- Lucas Dupin
- Maura Grimaldi
- Pedro Vieira, Thiago Honório
- Rafael RG
- Victor Mattina

=== 7th Bolsa Pampulha 2018/2019 ===
- Alex Oliveira
- Davi de Jesus do Nascimento
- Dayane Tropicaos
- Desali
- Gê Viana
- Guerreiro do Divino Amor
- Sallisa Rosa
- Sara Lana
- Simone Cortezão
- Ventura Profana

=== 8th Bolsa Pampulha 2021/2022 ===
The list of selected artists for the 8th edition includes:

- Artes Sapas (Letícia Bezamat, Nádia Fonseca)
- Ciber_org
- Comum
- A Cozinha Comum (Jon Olier, Júlia Bernardes, Lais Velloso and Silvia Herval)
- Dalila Coelho
- Froiid
- Hortência Abreu
- Ing Lee
- Ítalo Almeida
- Joseane Jorge
- Luana Vitra
- Lucas Emanuel
- Marcelo Venzon
- Marcus Deusdedit
- Mateus Moreira
- Pedro Neves
