= Kunstraum of Lüneburg University =

Contemporary art gallery in Germany

Coordinates: 53°13′40″N 10°24′08″E

The Kunstraum of Lüneburg University is an institution for contemporary art working across different faculties of Lüneburg University. Since its renaming in 2007 the complete name is Kunstraum of Leuphana University Lüneburg, frequently shortened as Kunstraum Leuphana in media features.

== History ==
In 1993 the Kunstraum has been founded by an interdisciplinary group of researchers, which is up to today in charge for the academic and artistic projects. Members of this group are:

- Art historian Beatrice von Bismarck (since 1999 at the Hochschule für Grafik und Buchkunst Leipzig)
- Mathematician Diethelm Stoller (retired since 2005)
- Sociologist Ulf Wuggenig (currently the acting director of Kunstraum)

The official opening in 1994 coincided with the project Services, which has been organized in collaboration with the art historian Helmut Draxler, at this time director of Kunstverein Munich, and the artist Andrea Fraser. The program of the subsequent years has been influenced and inspired by writings of Pierre Bourdieu, Nelson Goodman, Thomas S. Kuhn, and, amongst others, Howard S. Becker and included collaborations with artists and theoreticians associated with Institutional Critique.

== Exhibitions ==
- 1994: Services, with Andrea Fraser and Helmut Draxler
- 1994: The Open Public Library in Hamburg, with Michael Clegg and Martin Guttmann
- 1995: The Grandparents' Archives, with Christian Boltanski and Hans Ulrich Obrist
- 1996: Import/Export Funk Office − Digital Transformation, with Renée Green
- 1996: Public / Private, with Thomas Locher and Peter Zimmermann
- 1997: Revisions of Abstract Expressionism, with Roger M. Buergel, Ruth Noack, Stefanie-Vera Kockot
- 1997: Testoo® Muster, with Fabrice Hybert and Hans-Ulrich Obrist
- 1998: The Campus as a Work of Art, with Christian Philipp Müller
- 1999: Interarchive, with Hans-Peter Feldmann and Hans-Ulrich Obrist
- 2000: Greenhouse, with Dan Peterman
- 2001: Border Crossing Services, with Martin Krenn and Oliver Ressler
- 2003: Vivre en POF, with Fabrice Hybert
- 2004: The Government, with Roger M. Buergel and Ruth Noack
- 2005: Economies of Misery. Pierre Bourdieu in Algeria, with Franz Schultheis and Christine Frisinghelli
- 2006: Making Worlds <reformpause>, with Marion von Osten
- 2007: "The Division of the World"- Tableaux on the Legal Synopses of the Berlin Africa Conference, with Dierk Schmidt
- 2008: Moirés, with Astrid Wege
- 2010: Conceptual Paradise − the ~~studio~~ of interest, with Stefan Römer
- 2011: Demanding Supplies − Nachfragende Angebote, with Julia Moritz
- 2013: Front, Field, Line, Plane, with Urban Subjects (Sabine Bitter, Jeff Derksen, Helmut Weber)
- 2014: Art and its Frames – Continuity and Change, Symposium with Beatrice von Bismarck, Julia Bryan-Wilson, Helmut Draxler, Andrea Fraser, Renée Green, Hannes Loichinger, Sven Lütticken, John Miller, Marion von Osten, Gerald Raunig, André Rottmann, Stefan Römer, Simon Sheikh, and Ulf Wuggenig
- 2017: Backstage I, II and III
- 2019: Open Codes? - Exhibition in cooperation with the Center for Art and Media (ZKM), Karlsruhe.
- 2023: DEADTIME (“Maggie's Solo”) with Cally Spooner and Will Holder
- 2023: Twice - Park MccArthur with Nina Bartnitzek, Leonie Dinkloh, Daniela Fernanda Oliva Garcia, Patricia Fritze, Paula Gottschalk, Smilla Grubert, Rachel Haidu, Madeleine Häusler, Esther Heltschl, Elaine Lillian Joseph, Ann-Charlott Junior, Annelie Kebschull, Jacqueline Klemm, Antonina Kovacevic, Sophie McCuen-Koytek, Annelie Lau, Jordan Lord, Jan Müggenburg, Mariia Rakhmanova, Lea Marie Schöpper, Lili Berenike Merit Schröder, Wilson Sherwin, Chiara Steinmann, Elizaveta Voronova, Christopher Weickenmeier, Chiara Welter
- 2024: The Professor's Body. On Academic Affect and Habitus. Exhibition with Leda Bourgogne and event program with Franzis Kabisch, Ho Rui An, Rahel Spöhrer, and Maximiliane Baumgartner
- 2025: Seven Works - Wisrah C. V. da R. Celestino. Curated by Ana Druwe in collaboration with the Halle für Kunst Lüneburg. The group exhibition BE/HOLDING (curated by Marie-Sophie Dorsch and Lisa Deml) is being shown concurrently. Both exhibitions present works by Celestino that connect the two institutions.

== Literature ==
- Bismarck, Beatrice von; Stoller, Diethelm; Wuggenig, Ulf (1996). Games, fights, collaborations : das Spiel von Grenze und Überschreitung : Kunst und Cultural Studies in den 90er Jahren (in German). Ostfildern: Cantz. ISBN 3-89322-847-0. OCLC 36409506.
- Müller, Christian Philipp; Bismarck, Beatrice von; Universität Lüneburg (2001). Branding the campus : art, architecture, design, politics of identity. [Düsseldorf]: Richter. ISBN 3-933807-42-5. OCLC 48446907.
- Raunig, Gerald; Ray, Gene; Wuggenig, Ulf (2011). Critique of creativity : precarity, subjectivity and resistance in the 'Creative industries'. London: MayFlyBooks. ISBN 978-1-906948-13-9. OCLC 753268428.
