= Angela Kushchyk =

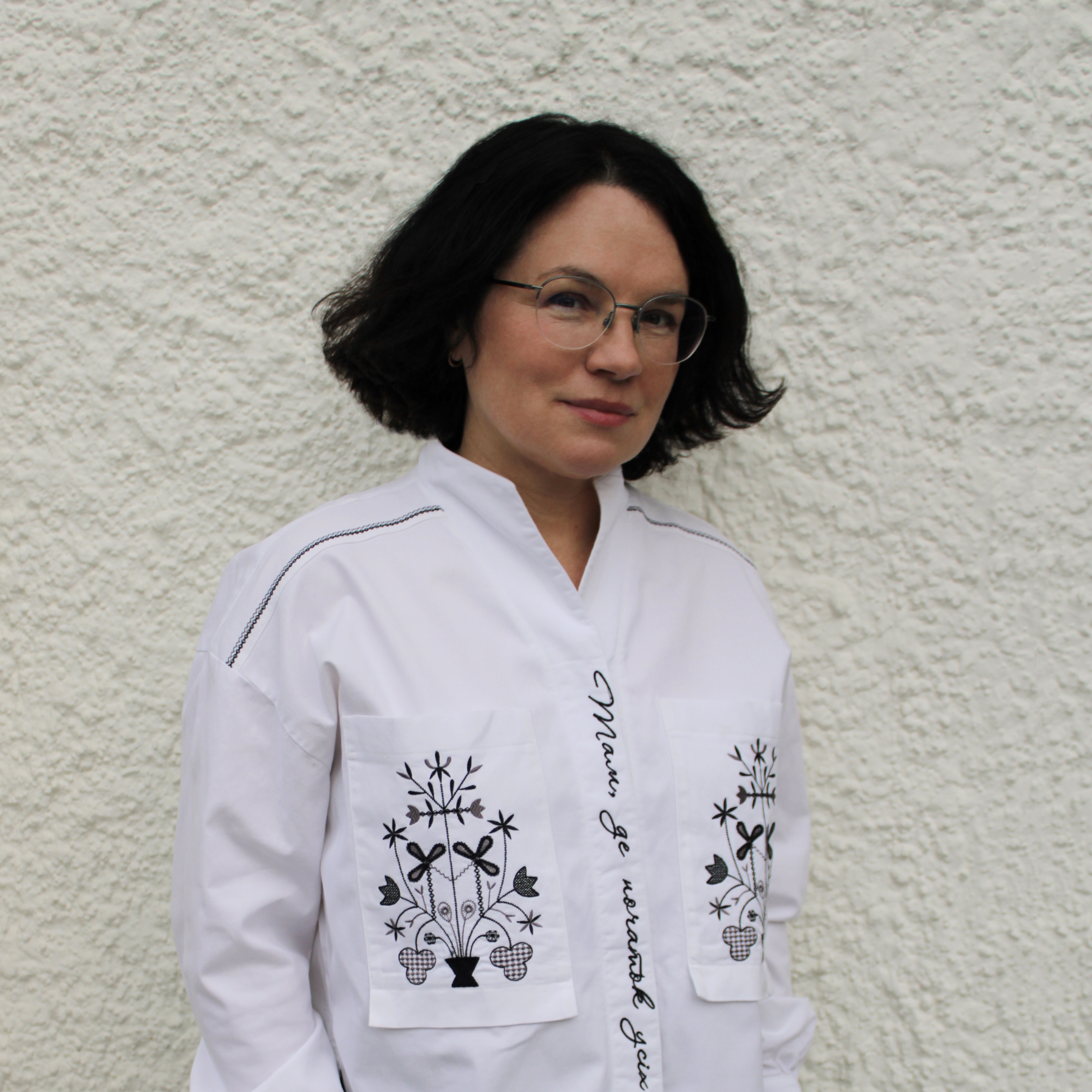
- Born: 15 April 1974 (age 52); Kyiv, Ukraine
- Education: National Academy of Fine Arts and Architecture
- Awards: "europeans in art"-Award, Munich, 2022

Angela Kushchyk (Ukrainian: Анжела Кущик; born 15 April 1974, Kyiv) is a Ukrainian artist working in painting and graphic arts, including lithography and etching. Member of the National Association of Artists (Germany).

== Biography ==
Kushchyk was born in Kyiv in 1974. From 1981 to 1991, she studied at Lyceum No. 157 in Kyiv, while also attending Art School No. 3 from 1986 to 1990.

Between 1993 and 1999, she studied at the National Academy of Fine Arts and Architecture specializing in book graphics (class of Halyna I. Halynska).

From 2019 to 2021, Kushchyk lived in Ethiopia, where she produced a series of graphic and painting works dedicated to African themes, using local materials. In 2020, she visited Lalibela in northern Ethiopia, which influenced her artistic practice.

She participates in Ukrainian and international exhibitions. Her works are held in private collections in Ukraine and internationally.

In May 2022, she received the Europeans in Art Award in the category “Fine Art / Street Art / Photo and Video Art” for the project STOP the WAR in UKRAINE in Munich, Germany.

== Work ==
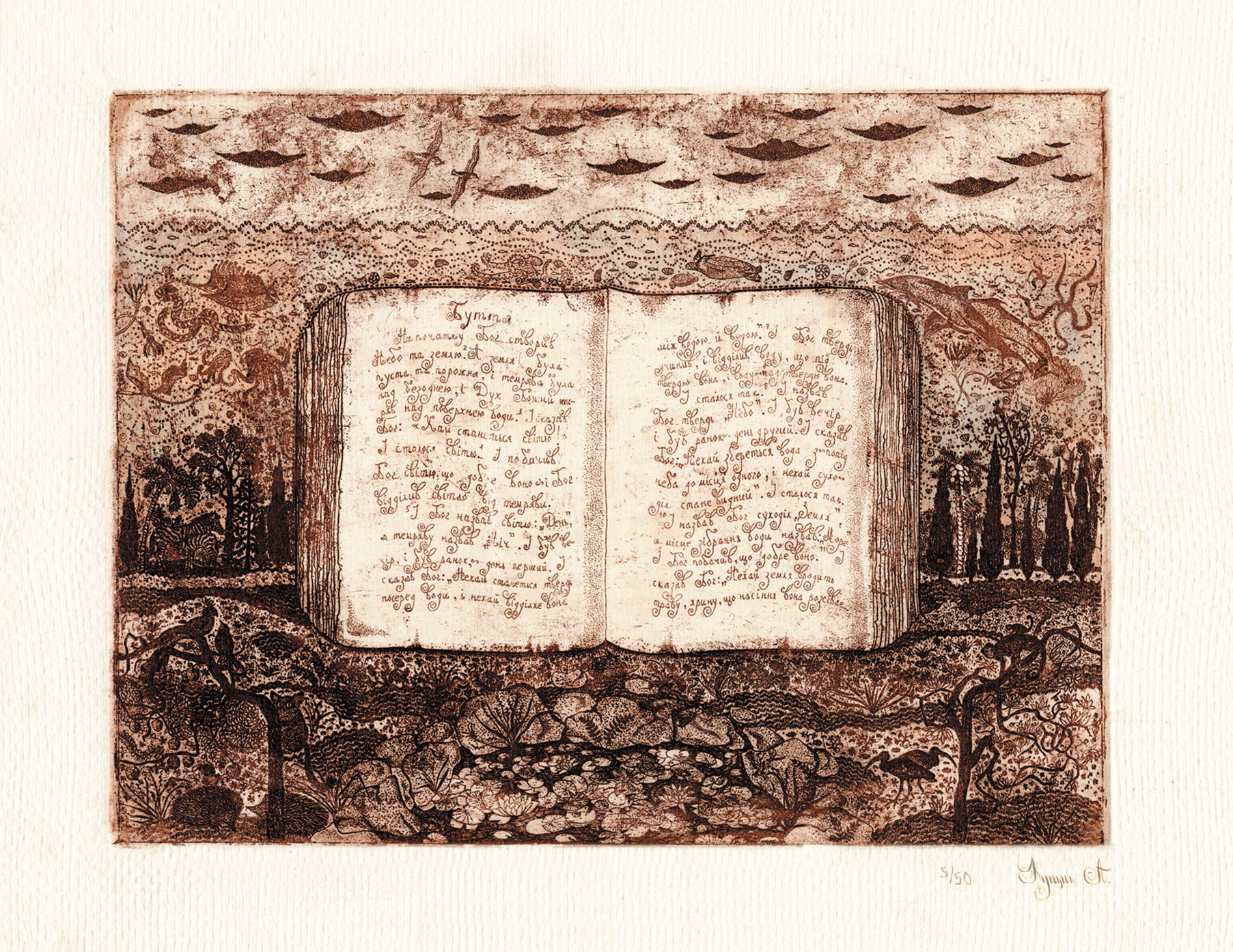
Angela Kushchyk Holy Bible. Genesis, etching, 2000.

Kushchyk’s artistic career developed in several stages. Initially in Kyiv she worked primarily in graphic art, focusing on lithography, engraving, and etching.

Her contributions to book graphics include illustrations for the Ukrainian primer Bukvar by M. S. Vashulenko and N. F. Skrypchenko (Kyiv: Osvita, 2001–2007), and a graphic element for the covers of Heinz Strubenhoff's books Was suchst du in der Fremde? Entwicklungshilfe zwischen Ideal und Wirklichkeit (Pliening: Verlagshaus Schlosser, 2026) and What are you Looking for in Foreign Lands? Development Aid: between Ideal and Reality (Europe Books, 2026).

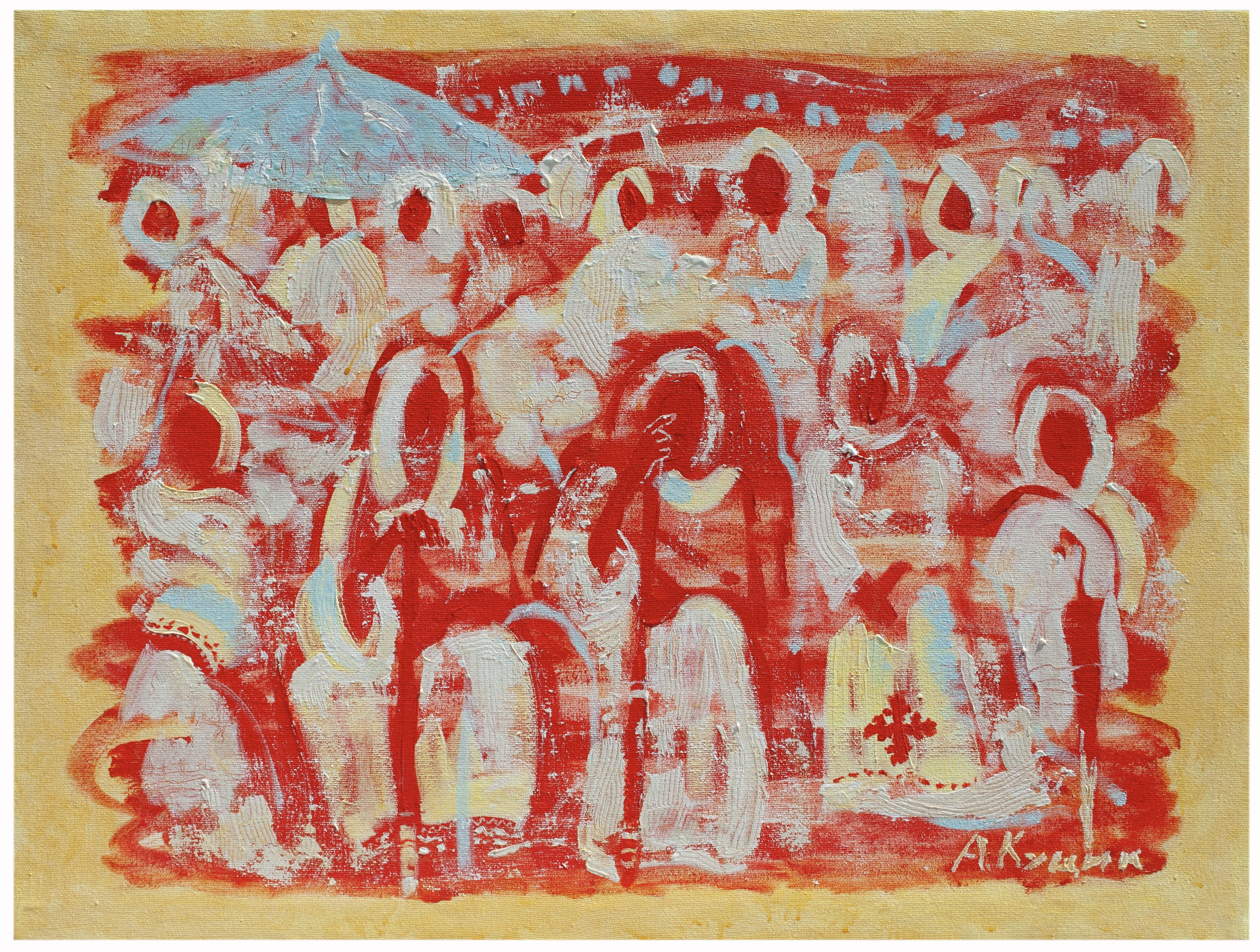
Angela Kushchyk Theophany. Ethiopia, 2019

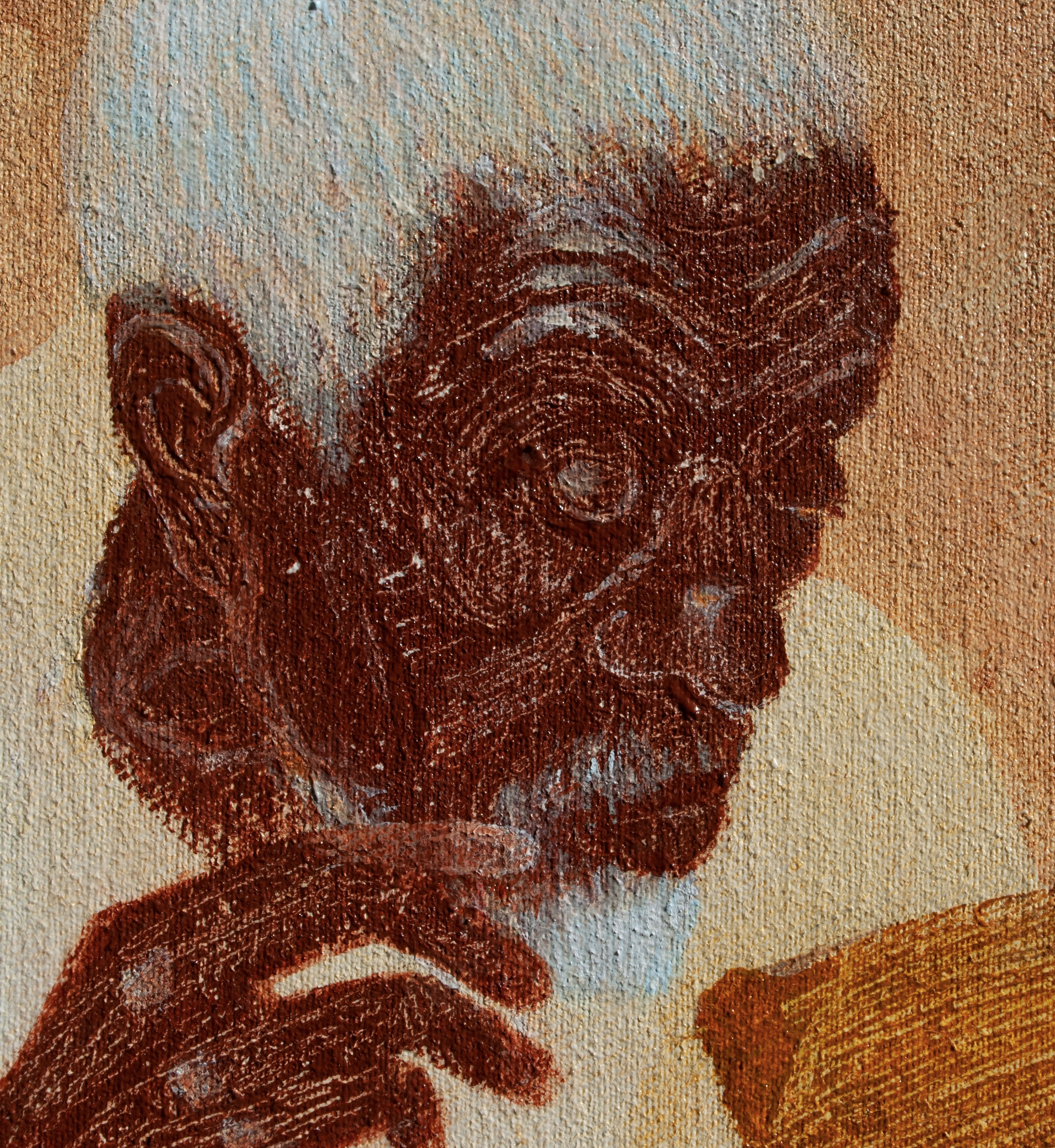
Angela Kushchyk Lalibela 2 (fragment), 2020

Later she switched to painting. Art critic Valentyna Yefremova notes original manner and professional use of various acrylic techniques by the artist:

Kushchyk skilfully uses various acrylic techniques, creating her own distinctive manner of painting. A dense, impasto brushstroke produces a rich pictorial texture that forms a stylised image in an oriental style of painting. In the interplay of colour patches, one can observe a tendency toward decorativeness and monumentality. At times, in a creative impulse, the artist demonstrates a painterly exuberance that suddenly comes to a halt at a certain boundary of balanced colour relationships. This reveals the painter’s artistic culture.

— Valentyna Yefremova, Metamorphoses of Angela Kushchyk, Кущик А./Kushchyk A. Жити, 2016

Kushchyk developed techniques at the merging of painting and graphic art. In a series of works created during her time in Ethiopia, she used textured methods, including cutting through layers of terracotta acrylic paint, to depict human figures and create expressive depth. Her work also includes black-and-white compositions characterised by minimal brushstrokes and simplified forms.

Her Ethiopian period was influenced by encounters with local artists, as well as by the cultures of the Mursi, Afar, and Maasai peoples, and the rock-hewn churches of Lalibela. During this time, Kushchyk created more than 100 works in various media.

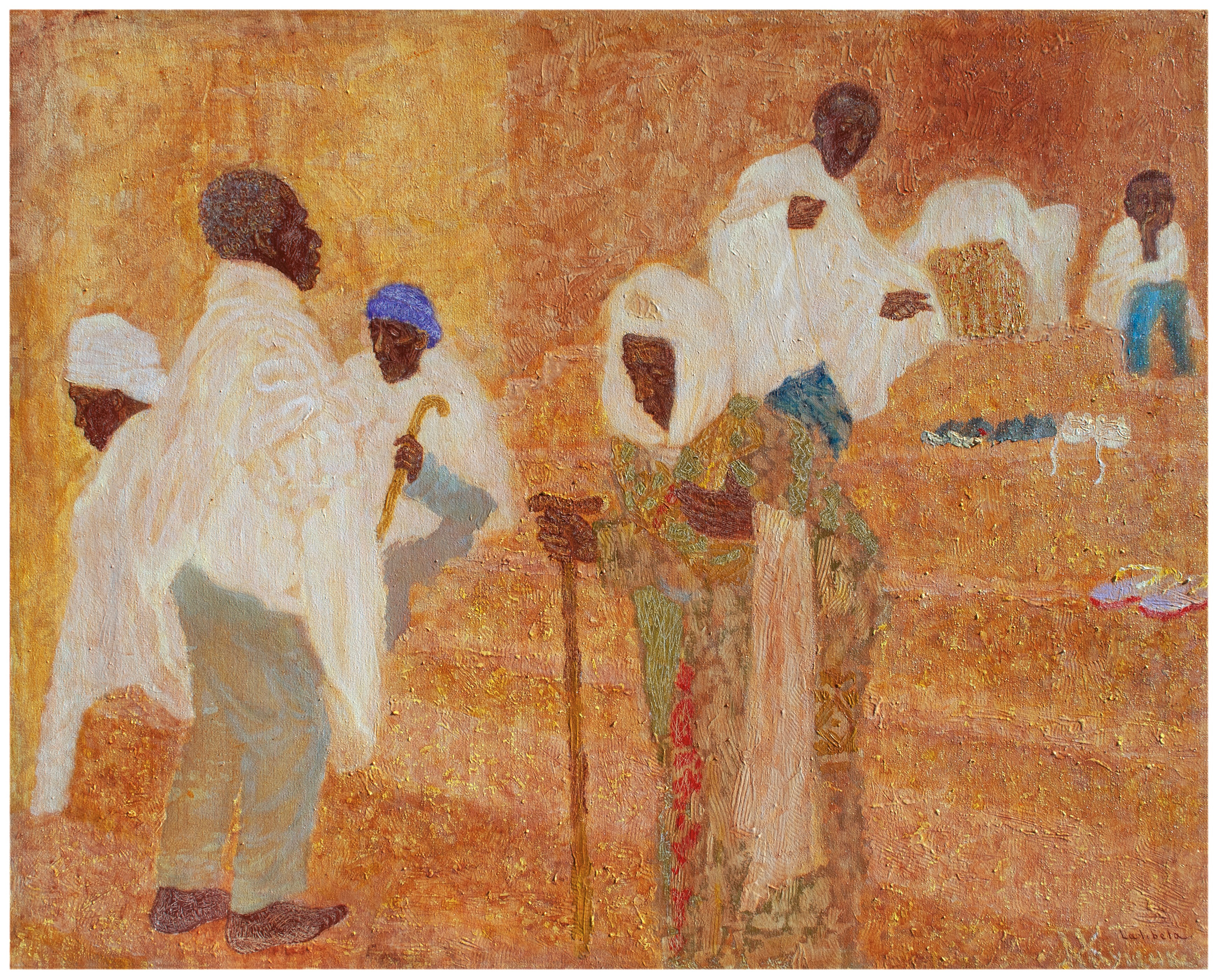
Angela Kushchyk, St. George's Church, 2020

Her experience with the echoes of war on another continent became relevant in Kyiv during the first weeks of Russia’s full-scale invasion of Ukraine. Between February and April 2022, she created a series of graphic works documenting the impact of war on the lives of Ukrainians.

In Angela’s war series, especially when seen as a whole, it is impossible not to feel a synergy of the objective and the abstract as they complement and enhance each other, creating an emotional tension of colossal force. Strung out in a white line all across a black sheet, the Siren is like an oscilloscope signal — a heart frozen in anticipation of a hit.

— Serhiy Synhayivsky, Two Wars of Angela Kushchyk, "Kyiv". 2022. №1-2. P. 174

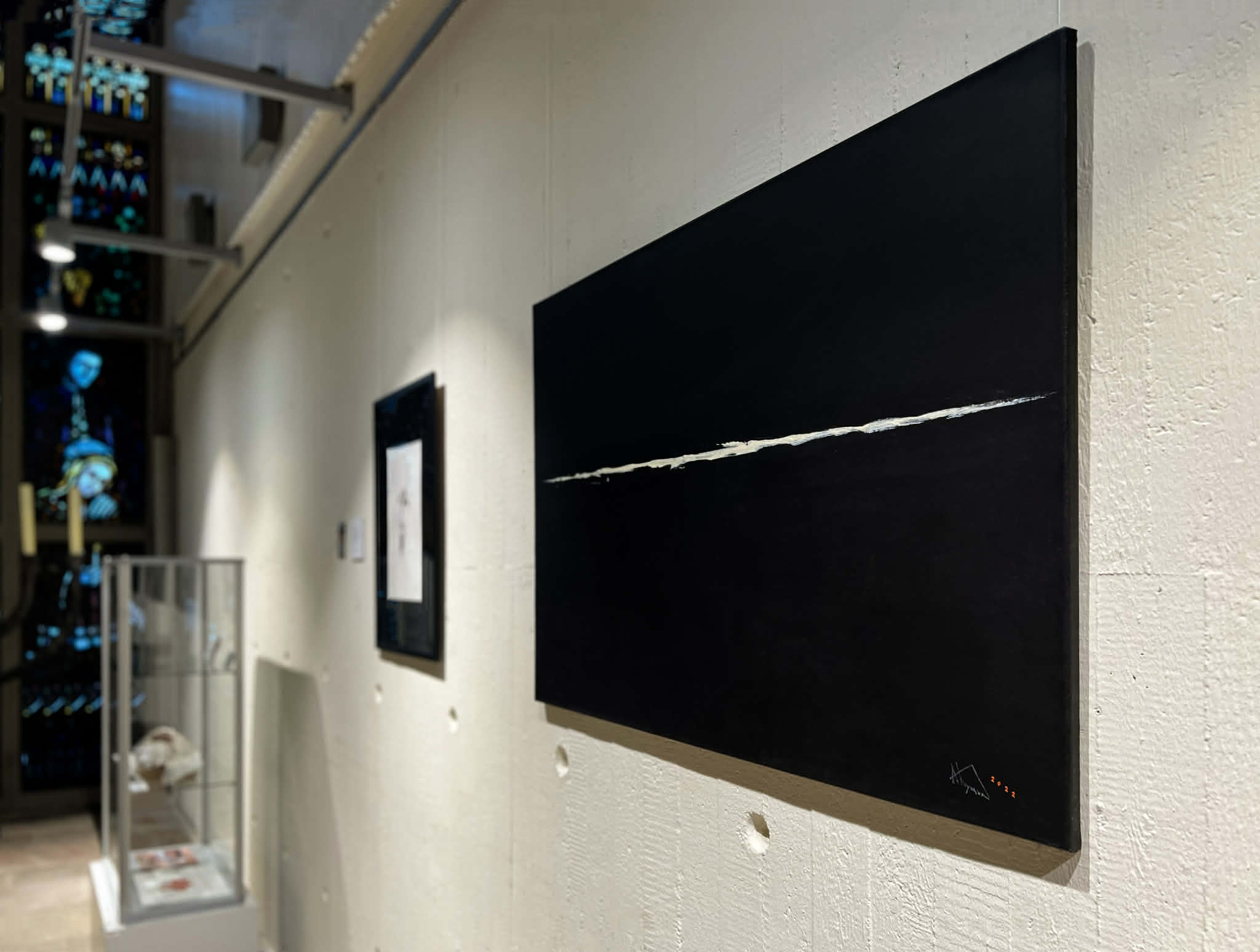
Angela Kushchyk Siren at the exhibition Art as a Lifeline, Hauptkirche St. Nikolai, Hamburg, Germany, 2025

Many of these works were created in bomb shelters in Kyiv and later formed the basis of the art book BIL. SCHMERZ. PAIN (Feniks, 2023).

Her works [...] have become diaries of the Russian-Ukrainian war, but they also tell a story of hope, a story of courage and faith in the inevitable victory of light over darkness

— Foreword, BIL.SCHMERZ.PAIN

The art book, which includes graphics, photographs, and documentation of the project’s reception across Europe, captures the full spectrum of emotions and reflections experienced by the artist during wartime.

When I felt I couldn’t endure the pain anymore, I came back to the canvas to give voice to my terrible pain and also incredible pride for Ukrainians.

— Angela Kushchyk, interviewed by Kateryna Chechel for www.ifc.org

Kushchyk's later work includes painted portraits that aim to convey both the physical appearance and psychological states of the subjects.

Her portrait practice focuses on translating intense emotional encounters into rapidly executed, expressive images that aim to capture not only physical likeness but also personality, vulnerability, and the spirit of a particular moment.

— NikitinMAG, Issue No. 3, November 2026

== Solo exhibitions ==
- 1999 — A Glance into Eternity, NEF Gallery, Kyiv-Pechersk Lavra, Kyiv
- 2021 — I am in Ethiopia, St. George Golla Art Gallery, Addis Ababa, Ethiopia
- 2022 — War Diaries in the Heart of Europe, U.S. Consulate General, Hamburg, Germany
- 2022 — Ukraine. Way of the Cross, Embassy of Ukraine, Warsaw, Poland
- 2022 — STOP the WAR in UKRAINE, K-Fest, Killorglin, Ireland
- 2022 — From Lalibela to the War in Ukraine, Hauptkirche St. Nikolai, Hamburg, Germany
- 2022 — STOP the WAR in UKRAINE, Ballybunion Arts Festival, Ireland
- 2022–2023 — STOP the WAR in UKRAINE, KUNSTLABOR 2, Munich, Germany
- 2023 — Bil. Schmerz. Pain, Consulate General of Ukraine, Hamburg, Germany
- 2023 — Will to Win, Am Schwarzen Meer Gallery, Bremen, Germany
- 2025 — Art as a Lifeline, Hauptkirche St. Nikolai, Hamburg, Germany

== Group exhibitions ==
- 2016 — Creating from the Invisible, Kyiv-Mohyla Academy, Kyiv
- 2016 — The Majestic Bible, Kyiv-Mohyla Academy, Kyiv
- 2017 — Together Along the Path of Life, 100th anniversary of NAOMA, Artist Gallery, Kyiv
- 2017 — International exhibition held in conjunction with the 57th Venice Biennale, Venice, Italy
- 2018 — Ukrainian Art Week, Kyiv
- 2020 — ADDIS International Art Symposium, Addis Ababa Museum, Ethiopia
- 2021 — ArtAntAlyA International Contemporary Art Fair (online), Antalya, Turkey
- 2021 — Multimedia exhibition Andila, Milan / Fuerteventura
- 2022 — Ukrainian Diaries: Art in Times of War, World Bank Group International Finance Corporation office, Vienna, Austria

== Projects ==
- 2021 — I am in Ethiopia, personal project supported by the Embassy of Ukraine in Ethiopia
- 2022 — STOP the WAR in UKRAINE (in collaboration with Kateryna Onul) presented in Poland, Germany, Ireland, and Austria

== Philanthropy ==
In 2022, Kushchyk and her husband, Heinz Strubenhoff, established the charitable foundation Angela und Heinz Stiftung aimed at providing help to people in need in Ukraine and Ethiopia. She is personally involved in charitable activities supporting internally displaced persons in Ukraine and children of Ukrainian defenders killed in the war.
