= Solange Pessoa =

Brazilian contemporary artist

Solange Pessoa (born 1961, Ferros, Brazil) is a Brazilian contemporary artist known for installations, sculptures, drawings, and paintings that incorporate organic materials and explore relationships between nature and culture and is recognised, in Brazil and internationally, for her contributions to contemporary installation art, conceptual art, and sculpture. Pessoa lives and works in Belo Horizonte, Brazil.

== Biography ==
Solange Pessoa is from the Brazilian state of Minas Gerais, a "high place of the colonial baroque now an industrial force 'thanks' to its activities of iron extraction." Her work is in part influenced by her surroundings, including the natural environment of her native Minas Gerais where the mining of iron ore, gemstones, gold, and other minerals is a prevalent cultural-historical force.

In 1996–1997, Pessoa received a grant from the Pollock-Krasner Foundation.

She has been making art since the 1980s, incorporating organic materials into her work from early in her career. According to Pessoa, "materials exist in connection with thoughts and intuitions. They call us and choose us, they attract our perception and curiosity, and their untransferable nature and mysteries require research and close observation."

Critic Eduardo Jorge de Oliveira, in an academic essay on Pessoa's Cathedral, writes that her practice "performs a material philosophy of abjection and embodiment, where hair, leather, and wax become living forces rather than inert matter." This emphasis on organic substances situates Pessoa within broader debates in contemporary eco-art and feminist theory.

== Exhibitions ==
The artist has held solo exhibitions at Aspen Art Museum, Colorado; Tramway, Glasgow; Kunsthaus Bregenz, Austria; Ballroom Marfa, Texas; Museu Mineiro, Belo Horizonte; Museu de Arte da Pampulha, Belo Horizonte; Museu da Inconfidência, Ouro Preto; Palácio das Artes, Belo Horizonte; and Centro Cultural São Paulo.

Her participation in major international exhibitions includes the 59th Venice Biennale – "The Milk of Dreams" in 2022, where she presented works in the Arsenale and soapstone sculptures in the Giardino delle Vergini. Spanish newspaper El País described Pessoa's presence at Venice as emblematic of the Biennale's "turn toward artists who reimagine life-forms through matter itself." Other significant group exhibitions include "Unravel: The Power and Politics of Textiles" at the Barbican Centre, London; "Reclaim the Earth" at the Palais de Tokyo, Paris (2022); and "Living Worlds" at Fondation Cartier, Lille. In its review of the Barbican show, The Guardian noted that Pessoa's textile-based sculptures “suggest archaic rituals and ecological futures in equal measure.”

Selected Solo Exhibitions
Year	Title	Institution	Notes
1992		Centro Cultural São Paulo	
1995		Palácio das Artes, Belo Horizonte	
2000		Museu da Inconfidência, Ouro Preto	
2008		Museu de Arte da Pampulha, Belo Horizonte	
2013	Metaflor-Metaflora	Museu Mineiro, Belo Horizonte	
2019	Longilonge	Ballroom Marfa	
2023	Solange Pessoa	Kunsthaus Bregenz	
2025	Pilgrim Fields	Tramway, Glasgow	
2025	Catch the Sun with Your Hand	Aspen Art Museum	

== Artistic Practice ==
Pessoa works with sculpture, installation, painting, drawing, ceramics, and video. Venice Biennale noted she has been "incorporating organic materials into her enigmatic and fantastical work, creating primordial and ritualistic forms that beat with both life and are muted by the spectre of death." Her materials include "[soapstone],earth, moss, leather, wax, feathers, hair, blood, fat." She has also described her practice in terms re-signification: "Feathers are a by-product, often discarded. I re-signify this material, selecting feathers, organizing them, and attaching them to large fabrics, creating flexible and moldable volumes… It is a kind of magical object, open, receptive, and ritualistic."

Her signature installation Bags (1994) "consists of burlap sacks filled with soil, plant matter, bones, seeds, and poems, creating what she describes as "a kind of great universal archive, diverse and infinite, which houses thick materialities (physical and symbolic) in a relationship between nature and culture." The work has been updated and exhibited in various iterations, including versions at Ballroom Marfa and Aspen Art Museum. Frieze magazine noted in 2020 that Pessoa's "paintings and sculptures often feature natural materials – including leaves, roots, eggs, seeds and minerals – found at the artist's family farm in the Brazilian state of Minas Gerais" and that "as in many of Pessoa's works, nature has been invited to take over." Her approach reflects her philosophy that "I dislike the separation of culture and nature. I have this imagination of an integrated philosophy, a natural philosophy, which incorporates culture as part of nature." In 2020, Circle Books published the first English-language monograph on the artist, edited by Alex Bacon with texts by art historians Cecilia Fajardo-Hill and Eduardo Jorge de Oliveira. In 2023, Kunsthaus Bregenz produced a major 224-page catalogue on Pessoa, situating her alongside an art historical context of artists engaging with materiality and landscape.

Pessoa has served as a teacher and mentor to younger Brazilian artists. The New York Times reported that rising artist Luana Vitra studied under Pessoa at the art school of the State University of Minas Gerais.
