= Luana Vitra =

Brazilian artist

Luana Vitra (b. 1995 Contagem, Minas Gerais, Brazil) is a contemporary sculpture, performance and installation artist, based in Contagem, Brazil. She is known for her work with minerals. Vitra was awarded the Frieze Focus Stand Prize (2025), PIPA Prize (2023), EDP Tomie Ohtake (2020), Prince Clauss Seed Award (2022), and Bolsa Pampulha (2022).

== Early life ==
The daughter of a carpenter and a teacher, Vitra grew up in Contagem, a city in the Belo Horizonte agglomeration known for its concentration of heavy industry. Vitra credits her upbringing for influence on materials and subjects she focuses on in her work. Her practice is rooted in the philosophical and spiritual traditions of the Afro-Brazilian diaspora, which often regard the earth as an ancestor

Vitra received a Bachelor in Fine Arts with a degree in sculpture at Guignard University of Art of Minas Gerais (State University of Minas Gerais) in 2018, and studied dance at Escola Livre de Artes 2014 -2017. The New York Times reported that she studied under Solange Pessoa at the art school of the State University of Minas Gerais.

== Career ==
Luana Vitra's work has been shown in prestigious venues such as the 2023 São Paulo Biennial., 2025 Sharjah Biennial, and in a solo exhibition in SculptureCenter in New York in 2025 She won the 2023 PIPA Prize. In a 2025 article in the New York Times, Siddhartha Mitter named Vitra "one of Brazil's fastest-rising young artists".

Her exhibition "Amulets" at SculptureCenter, New York in 2025 was described as "reimagining minerals as agents of resistance," giving them a political agency through their "inorganic memory". The exhibition included minerals strewn on the floor "like devotional offerings" and ritualistic shapes that express the contrast between the groundedness of minerals and something more transcendent.

The Brazilian gallery Mitre Galeria won the Frieze Art Fair Focus Stand award in 2025 for its presentation of Luana Vitra's solo project Série Giro (2024).

== Collections ==
Vitra's work is included in the collections of Pampulha Art Museum, Pinacoteca do Estado de São Paulo, and Rijkscollectie.
