= Ars viva =

Annual art prize

Ars viva is an annual art prize awarded by the Kulturkreis der deutschen Wirtschaft to emerging artists under the age of 35 who are living and working in Germany, regardless of nationality. Established in 1953, the prize was initiated to support artists in the aftermath of World War II, aiming to contribute to the development of contemporary art. Recipients are nominated and selected by a jury of professionals in the visual arts.

The award includes prize money and a series of exhibitions showcasing the winners' works at prominent German and international venues, accompanied by the publication of a bilingual exhibition catalog.

Over the decades, ars viva has recognized more than 350 artists, many of whom have achieved international acclaim, positioning the award as one of the most important art prizes in the Federal Republic of Germany. Notable recipients include Georg Baselitz, Anna Oppermann, Albert Oehlen, Rosemarie Trockel, Candida Höfer, Marina Abramović, Ulay, Thomas Ruff, Wolfgang Tillmans, John Bock, Thomas Demand, Omer Fast, Mariana Castillo Deball, Nina Canell, Sung Tieu, and Wisrah C. V. da R. Celestino.

== Residency ==
From 2016, all prize winners can participate in an artist residency in Canada due to the Fogo Island Arts residency program partnership with ars viva.

== Award winners ==
1953: Egon Altdorf, Jürgen Brandes, Harald Duwe, Johann-Georg Gey

1954: Ursula Arndt, Herrmann Bachmann, Ernst Dostal, Joachim Dunkel, Erwin Eichbaum, Carl-Heinz Kliemann, Harry Kögler, Helmut Lang, Heiner Malkowsky, Clemens Pasch, Jörn Pfab, Karl Stachelscheid, Helmut Verch, Eva Großberg, Karl Wennig

1955: Walter Brendel, Klaus Frank, Paul Ibenthaler, Helmut Lander, Irene Merz, Hermine Müller, Karl Potzler, Horst Skodlerrak, Eberhard Schlotter, Gotthelf Schlotter, Günther Schoregge, Dieter Stein, Hans Steinbrenner, Rudi Tröger, Wilhelm Uhlig, Joachim Wermann, Alfred Winter-Rust, Paul Wunderlich, Thomas Zach

1956: Klaus Arnold, Hal Busse-Bendixen, Michael Croissant, Wolfgang Dahncke, Roland Dörfler, Irene Goethert-Merz, Jürgen von Hündeberg, Paul Kamper, Hans Kock, Bernd Krimmel, Hans Metz, Günter Neusel, Dieter Rudolph, Brigitte Jonelat-Saebisch, Ernemann F. Sander, Willi Wernz, Gerhard Wind, Reiner Zimnik

1968: Georg Baselitz, Jürgen Erasmus Schlammer, Hans-Wolfgang Lingemann, Gerwalt Kafka, Tessa Traut

1969: Roberto Cordone, Rolf-Gunter Dienst, Wolfgang Göddertz, Karl-Hermann Käppel, Hans-Günther van Look, Karl Vogelsang

1971: Dieter Asmus, Peter Nagel, Dietmar Ullrich, Nikolaus Störtenbecker, Hede Brühl, Jobst Meyer, Claus Böhmler, Peter Nettesheim, Alf Schuler, Norbert Tadeusz

1977: Wolfgang Finck, Theo Lambertin, Gerhard Merz, Anna Oppermann

1978: Gerald Domenig, Ralph Fleck, Christian Hanussek, Nicole van den Plas, Rolf Zimmermann

1979: Katharina Sieverding

1982: Marina Abramović, Uwe Laysiepen, Barbara Hammann, Klaus vom Bruch, Marcel Odenbach, Friederike Pezold, Frank Soletti, Peter Kolb

1983: Albert Oehlen, Volker Tannert, Hans-Peter Adamski, Max Neumann, Hyun-Sook Song, Elisabeth Wagner, Troels Wörsel

1984: Helmut Dorner, Lutz Fritsch, Clemens Kaletsch, Axel Lieber, Mechthild Nemeczek, Peter Telljohann, Claude Wall

1985: Rosemarie Trockel,

1986: Ludger Gerdes

1987: Candida Höfer, Thomas Ruff, Thomas Struth

1989: Rupprecht Matthies

1990: Mischa Kuball

1991/1992: Meuser

1993/1994: Leni Hoffmann

1994: Karin Sander

1995: Wolfgang Tillmans, Thomas Demand

1996: Dirk Skreber, Corinne Wasmuht

1997: Heidi Specker, Daniel Pflumm

1998: Kai Althoff, Manfred Pernice, Torsten Slama, Sean Snyder, Lothar Hempel

1999: John Bock, Christian Flamm, Andree Korpys, Markus Löffler, Johannes Spehr

2000: Christoph Keller, Natascha Sadr Haghighian, Ute Hörner and Mathias Antlfinger, Jeanette Schulz

2001: Desirée Heiss, Ines Kaag, Jesko Fezer, Axel John Wieder, Katja Reichard, Johannes Wohnseifer

2002: Amelie von Wulffen, Daniel Roth

2003: Jeanne Faust, Omer Fast

2004: David Zink Yi, Peter Piller, Katja Strunz

2005: Jason Dodge, Takehito Koganezawa, Michaela Meise, Robin Rhode

2006/2007: Andrea Faciu, Beate Gütschow, Michael Sailstorfer

2008: Keren Cytter, Manuel Graf, Simon Dybbroe Møller, Tris Vonna-Michell

2010: Nina Canell, Klara Hobza, Andreas Zybach, Markus Zimmermann

2011: Erik Bünger, Philipp Goldbach, Juergen Staack

2012: Simon Denny, Melvin Moti, Özlem Günyol & Mustafa Kunt

2013: Björn Braun, John Skoog, Adrian Williams

2014: Aleksandra Domanović, Yngve Holen, James Richards

2015: Flaka Haliti, Hanne Lippard, Calla Henkel & Max Pitegoff

2016: Leon Kahane, Jumana Manna, Jan Paul Evers

2017: Zac Langdon-Pole, Oscar Enberg, Anna-Sophie Berger

2018: Niko Abramidis & NE, Cana Bilir-Meier, Keto Logua

2019: Karimah Ashadu, Thibaut Henz, Cemile Sahin

2020: Rob Crosse, Richard Sides, Sung Tieu

2021: Tamina Amadyar, Lewis Hammond, Mooni Perry

2022: Paul Kolling, Leyla Yenirce, Shaun Motsi

2023: Atiéna R. Kilfa, Dan Lie, caner teker

2024: Wisrah C. V. da R. Celestino, Vincent Scheers, Helena Uambembe

2025: Nazanin Noori, Ryan Cullen, Prateek Vijan

Note: The year refers to the year of the award ceremony. However, the award will be presented for the following year.

== Exhibition history ==
- ars viva 2026: Marta Herford (March - June, 2026), Kunstverein Braunschweig (December, 2026 - February, 2027)
- ars viva 2025: Kunsthalle Bremen (October 2024 - January 2025), Haus der Kunst (June - September, 2025)
- ars viva 2024: Wilhelm-Hack-Museum (October - December, 2023)
- ars viva 2023: Goethe-Institut Paris (September - November, 2022), Haus der Kunst (May - July, 2023)
- ars viva 2022: Brücke-Museum (September - November, 2021), Kai Art Center (April - August, 2022)
- ars viva 2021: Museum Angewandte Kunst (October, 2020 - March, 2021), Kunstverein Hannover (November, 2021 - January 2022)
