= PinchukArtCentre =

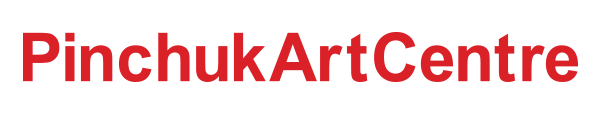

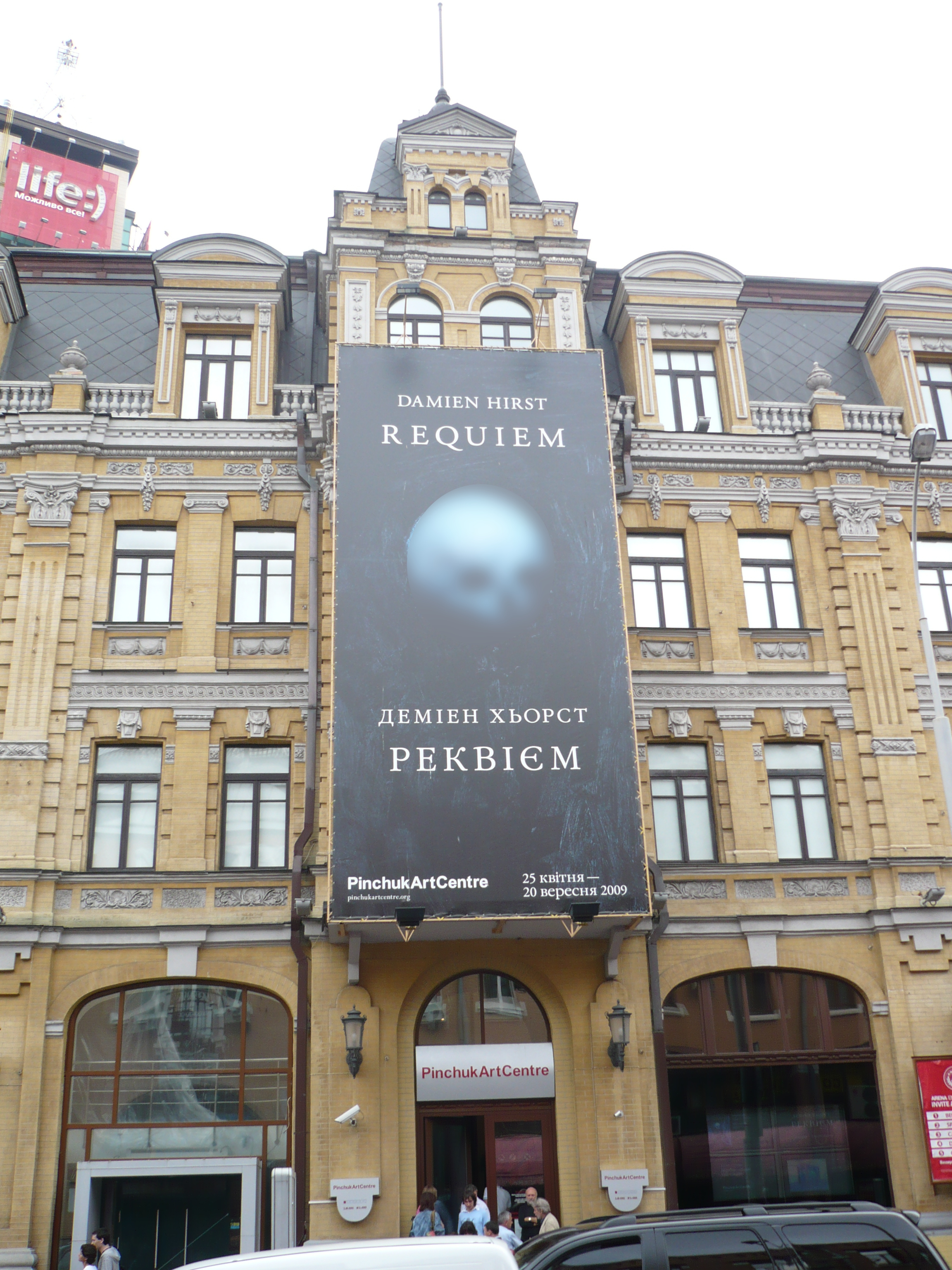
- PinchukArtCentre, Kyiv
- Established: 2006
- Location: 1/3-2, Block A, Velyka Vasylkivska
- Coordinates: 50°26′30″N 30°31′16″E
- Type: Art museum
- Website: pinchukartcentre.org

PinchukArtCentre is a private contemporary art centre, located in Kyiv with a collection of works by Ukrainian and international artists. The museum was opened on 16 September 2006 by the steel billionaire Victor Pinchuk.

The mission of the PinchukArtCentre mission is to exhibit new artistic production and collect national and international contemporary art. The centre's structure and focus consists of an international collection, temporary exhibitions, education programmes, publications, and scholarly research.

In 2007 and 2009, the PinchukArtCentre officially represented Ukraine at the Venice Biennale.

Admission to the museum is free.

== History ==
The PinchukArtCentre opened in 2006, founded by Victor Pinchuk, an industrialist originally from Dnipro.

In 2007 and 2009, PinchukArtCentre officially organized the Ukrainian Pavilion at the 52nd and 53rd Biennale in Venice. In 2011, the art centre presented the exhibition Future Generation Art Prize @ Venice - Ukrainian Collateral Event on the 54th Venice Biennale.

In late 2008, the centre announced the biennial PinchukArtCentre Prize, the first national prize for young artists up to 35 years old. 20 shortlisted artists were selected among more than 1100 applications and an international jury chose the winners of the Main Prize and two Special Prizes. Artem Volokitin from Kharkiv won the Main Prize, and Masha Shubina and Oleksii Salmanov got two Special Prizes. The PinchukArtCentre Prize award ceremony was held on December 4, 2009.

In 2011, the PinchukArtCentre Prize Expert Committee reviewed more than 1,000 applications received from young artists from Ukraine and abroad, and formed a shortlist of the Prize nominees. As part of a group exhibition of 20 shortlisted artists, 20 new artists’ statements, produced with the support of the PinchukArtCentre for the show, were presented at the art centre.

Laureates of the PinchukArtCentre Prize 2011 were announced at the award ceremony that took place on December 9, 2011, in Kyiv. The winner of the Main Prize was Mykyta Kadan; Zhanna Kadyrova and Serhiy Radkevych won two Special Prizes, and the Public Choice Prize went to Mykyta Shalennyi.

In October 2011 PinchukArtCentre opened an application call for the new Curatorial Platform, a two-year full-time program combining a theoretical and practical training in curatorial and exhibition work. The programme is open for all Ukrainians up to 30.

Based on the decision of the selection committee, the first Curatorial Platform participants, chosen from more than 130 applicants, were Lizaveta German (23 years, Kyiv), Tatiana Kochubynska (26 years, Kyiv), Oleksandr Mykhed (23 years, Kyiv), Maria Lanko (25 years, Kyiv) and Kateryna Radchenko (27 years, Odesa). These selected applicants started their two-year residency program in January 2012.

As of February 2012, the total number of PinchukArtCentre visitors since its opening reached over 1,475,000 people.

=== Union firing controversy ===
In October 2019, mediators working at PinchukArtCentre joined a trade union. They cited violations of labour legislation as the reason for this, particularly the lack of sick leave and paid leave. On December 25, 2019, trade union members held a protest near the PinchukArtCentre, during which they handed the centre's management an official letter about the start of negotiations on the conclusion of a collective labour agreement. However, after the action, the fixed-term contracts of all mediators were not extended, and on February 9, 2020, the management of PinchukArtCentre announced that it was cancelling the position of mediators. This decision caused a significant response in the mass media, after which the centre's management stated that the dismissal of the mediators was not related to the creation of a trade union. In solidarity with the former mediators, the artists Pavlo Grazhdanskij and Valentyna Petrova refused to be nominated for the PinchukArtCentre 2020 Prize, and other artists also declared their support for the mediators. On February 16, 2020 during a public discussion within the PinchukArtCentre Prize nominees exhibition, anthropologist Nadiya Chushak spoke in support of the trade union, reading an appeal from the organization. The Committee of the Verkhovna Rada on Social Policy and Protection of Veterans' Rights used the release of mediators as a precedent when discussing the issue of expanding the scope of using fixed-term employment contracts.

=== After the 2022 Russian invasion ===
After the beginning of the full-scale Russian invasion of Ukraine on 24 February 2022, the PinchukArtCentre suspended its activities and remained closed for 143 days, reopening to the public on 17 July 2022. On reopening, the institution launched the large group exhibition When Faith Moves Mountains, organized in partnership with the Museum of Contemporary Art Antwerp (M HKA) and the Flemish Government, which brought together more than 45 international and Ukrainian artists to underline Ukraine’s cultural ties with Europe and to present works, many of them created during the war, in a dialogue that addressed the social and emotional impact of the conflict.

At the same time, the PinchukArtCentre and the Victor Pinchuk Foundation developed the documentary project Russian War Crimes, an exhibition of photographs and testimonies documenting alleged war crimes committed across Ukraine since the start of the invasion; the project, realized in partnership with the Office of the President of Ukraine, the Ministry of Foreign Affairs of Ukraine, Ukrainska Pravda and the Ukrainian Association of Professional Photographers, was first shown in Kyiv and was subsequently presented abroad in venues including Berlin and Bratislava to raise international awareness of the scale of civilian suffering and to advocate for accountability. In the post‑invasion period, the PinchukArtCentre has continued to position itself as a platform for Ukrainian artists responding to the war while maintaining its international profile through collaborations and travelling exhibitions, contributing to broader cultural diplomacy efforts by Ukraine during the ongoing conflict.

== Future Generation Art Prize ==
On December 1, 2009, the Victor Pinchuk Foundation established Future Generation Art Prize, an online art competition for artists 35 and under, with PinchukArtCentre organizing.

The first jury of the prize included Daniel Birnbaum, Robert Storr, Okwui Enwezor, and Ai Weiwei. On June 29, 2010, seven members of the Selection Committee featuring competent and global art-professionals, selected 20 artists from more than 6,000 applications coming from 125 countries and divided over all continents.

The biennial award consists of a $100,000 prize, $40,000 of which is required to go towards producing art to ensure that the winner continues working. Every two years (with an edition skipping a year in 2016), the PinchukArtCentre holds an exhibition of artists under 35 from around the globe and awards a grand prize. In 2019, they awarded additional special prizes of $20,000. Alongside the central exhibition held at the PinhukArtCentre, the show travels to Venice, Italy as an official collateral event of the Venice Biennale.

=== Past Winners ===
==== 2010 ====
- Main Prize: Cinthia Marcelle. Special and Public Choice Award: Nicolae Mircea

==== 2012 ====
- Main Prize: Lynette Yiadom-Boakye. Special Prize: Jonathas de Andrade, Marwa Arsanios, Micol Assael, Ahmet Öğüt, Rayyane Tabet. People's Choice Award: Meiro Koizumi

==== 2014 ====
- Main Prize: Nástio Mosquito, Carlos Motta. Special Prize: Aslan Gaisumov, Nikita Kadan, Zhanna Kadyrova

==== 2017 ====
- Main Prize: Dineo Seshee Bopape. Special Prize: Phoebe Boswell

==== 2019 ====
- Main Prize: Emilija Škarnulytė. Special Prize: Cooking Sections, Gabriel Goliath

== PinchukArtCentre Prize “Artprise” ==
PinchukArtCentre Prize “Artprise” (Ukrainian: Премія PinchukArtCentre) is a national biennial art award established in 2009 by the PinchukArtCentre in Kyiv. It recognizes the achievements of young Ukrainian artists (up to 35 years old) in contemporary art. It is Ukraine’s first privately funded national art prize.

Established in late 2008 and first awarded in 2009, the prize aims to support emerging Ukrainian talent, strengthening the cultural landscape and promoting Kyiv as an international cultural. Up to 20 nominees are selected by an independent committee and exhibit their work at PinchukArtCentre.

=== Award by year ===
==== 2009 ====
The inaugural edition featured over 1,100 applications. A shortlist of 20 artists was selected, and awards were presented in December 2009. Laureates included:

- Main Prize: Artem Volokitin.
- Special Prizes: Masha Shubina, Oleksii Salmanov.

==== 2011 ====
The second edition received more than 1,000 applications. A shortlist of 20 artists produced work for the exhibition. Awards were given in December 2011:

- Main Prize: Nikita Kadan.
- Special Prizes: Zhanna Kadyrova, Serhii Radkevych.
- Public Choice: Mykyta Shalennyi.

==== 2013 ====
Applications closed in April with over 3,000 submissions, of which 20 artists were shortlisted for an exhibition running from October 26, 2013 to January 5, 2014. Awards were announced in December 2013:

- Main Prize: Zhanna Kadyrova.
- Special Prizes: Open Group; Lada Nakonechna.
- Public Choice: Anatolii Bielov.

==== 2015 ====
From approximately 800 applicants, 16 finalists were selected. Jury included Bart De Baere, Björn Geldhof, Martin Kiefer, Yuriy Leiderman, and Anna Smolak. Winners announced December 2015.

- Main Prize: Open Group (Yurii Bilei, Pavlo Kovach, Anton Varga).
- Special Prizes: Anna Zvyahintseva, Alina Kleitman.
- Public Choice: Anna Zvyahintseva.

==== 2018 ====
- Main Prize: Anna Zvyahintseva.
- Special Prizes: Nikolay Karabinovych, Yarema Malashchuk & Roman Khimey.
- Public Choice: Alina Kleitman.

==== 2020 ====
The sixth edition winners, selected by a jury including Björn Geldhof and Katerina Gregos, were announced March 11, 2020:

- Main Prize: Group Yarema Malashchuk & Roman Khimey.
- Special Prizes: Nikolay Karabinovych, Uli Holub.
- Public Choice: Danyil Revkovskyi & Andrii Rachinskyi.

==== 2022 ====
The seventh edition jury included Yevhenia Belorusets, Marta Kuzma, Bart de Baere, Björn Geldhof. Winners announced April 2023:

- Main Prize: Dana Kavelina.
- Special Prizes: Nikolay Karabinovych, Anton Saenko, Kateryna Lysovenko.
- Public Choice: Mykhailo Alieksieenko.

==== 2025 ====
Shortlist of 20 artists announced September 24, 2024; exhibition ran February–July 2025. Included a posthumous mention for Veronika Kozhushko. Selection committee featured Zhanna Kadyrova, Bozhena Pelenska, Kateryna Semeniuk, Serhii Klymko, Oleksandra Pohrebniak.

- Main Prize: Lesia Vasylchenko.
- Special Prizes: Yevhen Korshunov, Kateryna Aliinyk.
- Public Choice: Yevhen Korshunov.
