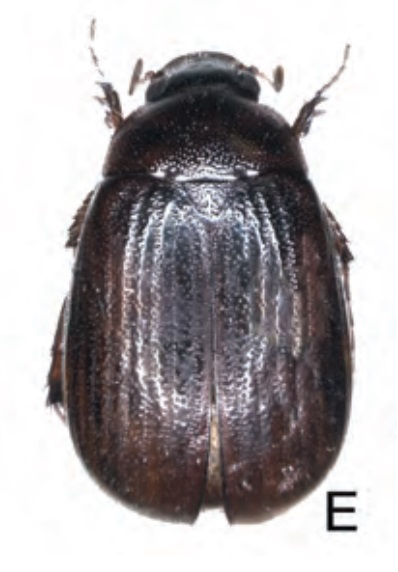

Scientific classification
- Kingdom: Animalia
- Phylum: Arthropoda
- Class: Insecta
- Order: Coleoptera
- Suborder: Polyphaga
- Infraorder: Scarabaeiformia
- Family: Scarabaeidae
- Genus: Maladera
- Species: M. hunliensis

Binomial name
- Maladera hunliensis Ahrens & Fabrizi, 2016

= Maladera hunliensis =

Species of beetle

Maladera hunliensis is a species of beetle of the family Scarabaeidae. It is found in India (Arunachal Pradesh).

== Description ==
Adults reach a length of about 9.1 mm. They have a dark reddish brown, oval body. They are shiny, except for some setae on the head. The dorsal surface is nearly glabrous.

== Etymology ==
The species name refers to the type locality, Hunli.
