= Future Generation Art Prize =

Global contemporary art prize for young artists

The Future Generation Art Prize is a biannual global contemporary art prize with the aim to discover, recognize and give long-term support to young artists. The prize was established by the Victor Pinchuk Foundation in 2009. The winner is awarded a total of $100,000 (2019), including a cash prize of $60,000 and $40,000 towards the production of new work.

== History ==
On December 8, 2009, the Victor Pinchuk Foundation announced the establishment of the Future Generation Art Prize, a new large-scale international competition for artists up to 35 years old, with the PinchukArtCentre acting as the organizer. On June 29, 2010, seven members of the Selection Committee featuring competent and global art-professionals, selected 20 artists from more than 6,000 applications coming from 125 countries and divided over all continents. Every two years (with an edition skipping a year in 2016), the PinchukArtCentre holds an exhibition of artists under 35 from around the globe and awards a grand prize. Alongside the central exhibition held at the PinhukArtCentre, the show travels to Venice, Italy as an official collateral event of the Venice Biennale.

== Past winners ==
- 2010: Main Prize: Cinthia Marcelle
- 2012: Main Prize: Lynette Yiadom-Boakye. Special Prize: Jonathas de Andrade, Marwa Arsanios, Micol Assael, Ahmet Öğüt, Rayyane Tabet. People's Choice Award: Meiro Koizumi
- 2014: Main Prize: Nástio Mosquito, Carlos Motta. Special Prize: Aslan Gaisumov, Nikita Kadan, Zhanna Kadyrova
- 2017: Main Prize: Dineo Seshee Bopape. Special Prize: Phoebe Boswell
- 2019: Main Prize: Emilija Škarnulytė. Special Prize: Cooking Sections, Gabriel Goliath
- 2021: Main Prize: Aziz Hazara. Special Prize: Agata Ingarden, Mire Lee and Pedro Neves Marques.

== See also ==
- List of European art awards
