= Wisrah C. V. da R. Celestino =

Award-winning German artist

Wisrah C. V. da R. Celestino (1989, Buritizeiro) is a conceptual artist based in Berlin, Germany, whose work on language, institutional critique, and objecthood is recognized for its precise formulation of contractual propositions. Celestino was awarded the ars viva 2025, Bolsa Pampulha 2024, and the Ducato Prize 2023.

They hold a Bachelor of Laws degree from the Federal Fluminense University Law School and have completed a postgraduate artistic residency program at Hochschule für Bildende Künste Braunschweig.

== Work, Research, and Critique ==
Curator Haris Giannouras argues that Celestino's practice explores "agency and complicity" within institutional systems, highlighting the artist's agency from the exhibition and contractual structures via transactional propositions. In RENTAL/FATHER (2023), Celestino proposes that the exhibiting institution rent one or more objects from their father. RENTAL/FATHER has been widely exhibited, with presentations at Simian (Copenhagen), Kunsthal Nord (Aalborg), Kunsthalle Bremen, Bonniers Konsthall (Stockholm), and Haus der Kunst (Munich).

Their 2024 solo exhibition at Kunstverein Kevin in Vienna included works that involved contributions from their mother (Ana, 2024), the distribution of their body weight in municipal water across metal canisters (Peso, 2024), and an arrangement of native plant species classified as invasive in other contexts (Gift, 2024). Peso (2024) was later exhibited at Kunstverein Braunschweig, Bonniers Konsthall (Stockholm), Museum Abteiberg (Mönchengladbach), and Museum Kurhaus Kleve. Since 2026, Peso is part of the permanent collection of Museum Kurhaus Kleve.

Writing for C& América Latina, artist and researcher Maya Quilolo described Celestino’s methodology as a form of "reverse architecture," in which spatial configurations are treated as active sites of negotiation shaped by institutional power and economic infrastructure. According to Quilolo, these gestures “claim exhibition space as an economic relationship” and foreground the “instability and insecurity of criticism as a mechanism of its creation and circulation."

Critic Mateus Nunes, profiling the artist for Revista Select , situates their practice within a “softness of boundaries,” emphasizing resistance to institutional binaries through infrastructural and familial proximity. Nunes underscores Celestino’s integration of Afro-diasporic epistemologies, framing their work as a mode of “market disobedience.”

== Academic Presence ==
Celestino has given talks, workshops, and lectures at several educational institutions, particularly in universities in German-speaking countries, including the Leuphana Universität Lüneburg, Hochschule für Bildende Künste Braunschweig, Hochschule für Grafik und Buchkunst Leipzig, Akademie der Bildenden Künste München, the Akademie der Bildenden Künste Nürnberg, and the Hochschule für Gestaltung und Kunst in Basel.

== Awards and Residencies ==
Celestino was awarded the ars viva in 2025 and the Ducato Prize in 2023. Other accolades includes Akademie Schloss Solitude, Germany, Salzburger Kunstverein, Austria; Pampulha Grant, Brazil (Belo Horizonte Municipal Foundation for Culture); Hochschule für Bildende Künste Braunschweig, Germany (Ministry of Science and Culture of the Lower Saxony); La Becque, Switzerland (Pro Helvetia); PACT Zollverein, Germany; British Council, UK; and Pivô, Brazil.

== Collections and Archives ==
The work of Wisrah C. V. da R. Celestino is included in the collections and archives of the Museu Nacional da República, Kadist, The One Minutes Foundation at the Sandberg Instituut, Kunstraum Leuphana, Museum Kurhaus Kleve, and Kunst Raum Mitte
