= Beatrice von Bismarck =

German woman art historian (born 1959)

Beatrice von Bismarck (born 1959) is a German art historian, curator, author and professor for art history and Bildwissenschaft.

== Life ==
Bismarck studied art history in Freiburg, Munich, London and Berlin. From 1989 to 1993, she worked at the Städel in Frankfurt and was responsible for solo exhibitions of internationally renowned artists such as Richard Long, Bruce Nauman (1991), Dan Flavin and Jürgen Partenheimer (1993). She then took over as head of the 20th century department of the Städelsches Kunstinstitut for three years.

From 1993 to 1999, von Bismarck was an assistant at the University of Lüneburg, where she was co-founder of the Kunstraum of Lüneburg University. She then held an assistant professorship at the Hochschule für Grafik und Buchkunst Leipzig for one year, after which she was appointed professor and programme director of the gallery in 2000. Between 2003 and 2011 she was prorectorin at the HGB Leipzig.

== Publications ==
- Die Gauguin-Legende. Die Rezeption Paul Gauguins in der französischen Kunstkritik 1880–1903, Münster/ Hamburg 1992. ISBN 3-88660-768-2
- Games Fights Collaborations. Das Spiel von Grenze und Überschreitung. Kunst und Cultural Studies in den Jahren, (published together by Diethelm Stoller and Ulf Wuggenig), Ostfildern-Ruit 1996. ISBN 3-89322-847-0
- Bismarck, Beatrice von. (1998). Bruce Nauman : der wahre Künstler = the true artist. Esner, Rachel. Ostfildern-Ruit: Cantz Verlag. ISBN 3-89322-291-X. OCLC 40287764.
- Christian Philipp Müller, Beatrice von Bismarck: Branding the Campus .Kunst, Architektur, Design, Identitätspolitik, (ed. by Beatrice von Bismarck, Diethelm Stoller, Astrid Wege and Ulf Wuggenig), Düsseldorf 2001. ISBN 3-933807-42-5
- Interarchive. Archivalische Praktiken und Handlungsräume im zeitgenössischen Kunstfeld, (Beatrice von Bismarck, Hans Ulrich Obrist, Diethelm Stoller and Ulf Wuggenig), Cologne 2002. ISBN 978-3-88375-540-3
- Grenzbespielungen. Visuelle Politik in der Übergangszone, Beatrice von Bismarck, Cologne, 2005. ISBN 3-88375-953-8
- Globalisation/Hierarchy. Kulturelle Dominanzen in Kunst und Kunstgeschichte, Marburg 2005 (Beatrice von Bismarck, Irene Below). ISBN 3-89445-339-7
- beyond education. Kunst, Ausbildung, Arbeit und Ökonomie, Frankfurt, 2005 (Beatrice von Bismarck, Alexander Koch). ISBN 3-86588-102-5
- Nach Bourdieu. Visualität, Kunst, Politik (Beatrice von Bismarck, Therese Kaufmann nnd Ulf Wuggenig), Vienna 2008. ISBN 3-85132-527-3
- Auftritt als Künstler, Funktionen eines Mythos Cologne 2010. ISBN 3-86560-517-6
