= Andrea Fraser =

American performance artist (born 1965)

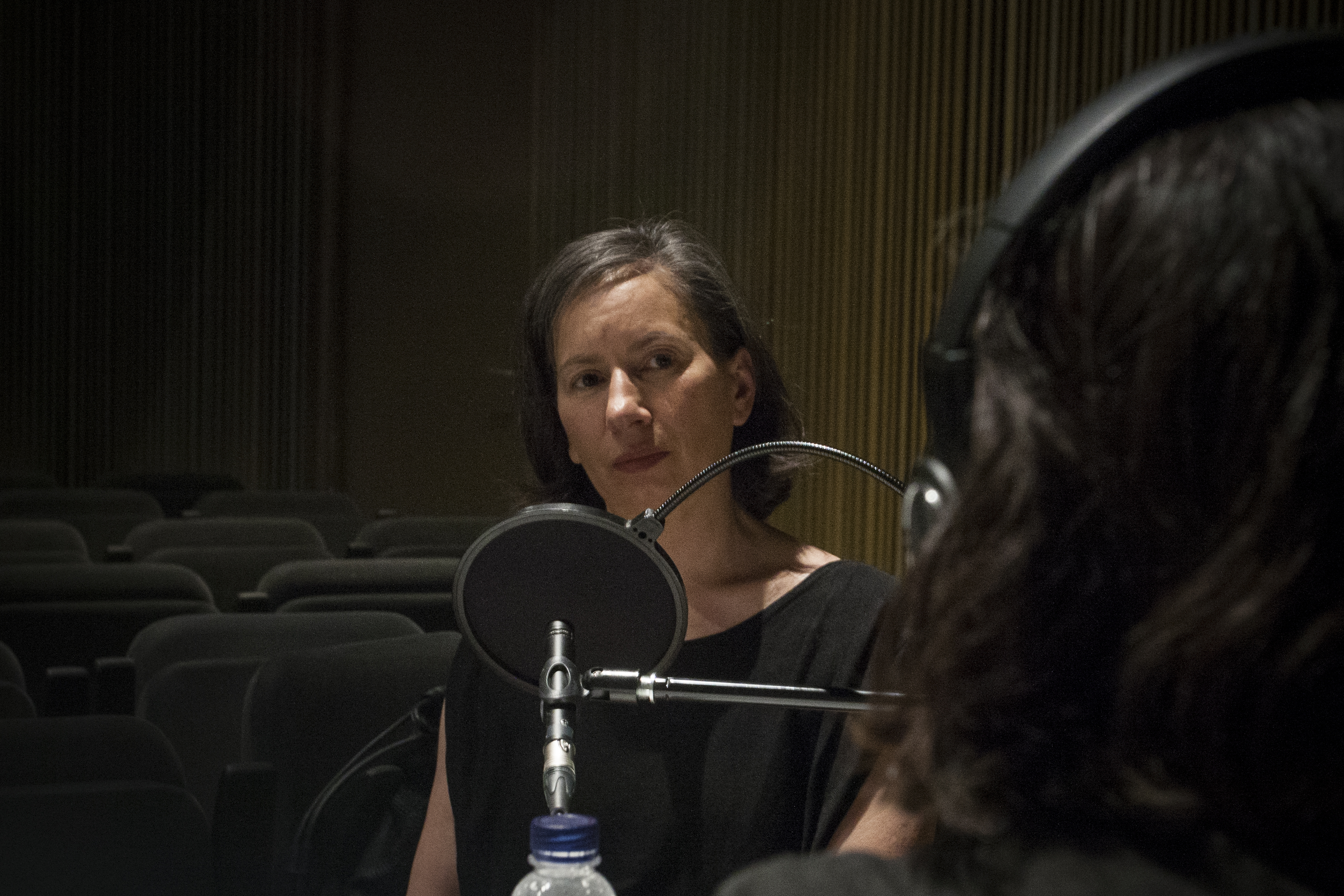
- Fraser in 2016
- Born: 1965 (age 60–61); Billings, Montana, United States
- Education: School of Visual Arts, New York; Whitney Independent Study Program
- Known for: Performance art
- Notable work: Museum Highlights (1989); Official Welcome (2001); Little Frank and His Carp (2001); Untitled (2003); Projection (2008); Not Just a Few of Us (2014); Down the River (2016)
- Movement: Feminist, Institutional critique
- Awards: National Endowment for the Arts Visual Arts Fellowship (1991); Anonymous Was A Woman Fellowship (2012); Wolfgang Hahn Prize (2013); Oskar Kokoschka Prize (2016)

Andrea Rose Fraser (born 1965) is a performance artist, mainly known for her work in the area of institutional critique. Fraser is based in New York and Los Angeles and is a professor and area head of the Interdisciplinary Studio of the UCLA School of Arts and Architecture at the University of California, Los Angeles.

== Early life and career ==
Fraser was born in Billings, Montana and grew up in Berkeley, California. She attended New York University, the Whitney Museum's independent study program, and the School of Visual Arts. Fraser worked as a gallery attendant at Dia Chelsea.

Fraser began writing art criticism before incorporating a similar analysis into her artistic practice.

== Work ==
Fraser was co-organizer, with Helmut Draxler, of Services, a "working-group exhibition" that was conceived at Kunstraum of Lüneburg University and toured eight venues in Europe and the United States between 1994 and 2001.

Museum Highlights (1989) involved Fraser posing as a museum tour guide at the Philadelphia Museum of Art under the pseudonym of Jane Castleton. During the performance, Fraser led a tour through the museum while describing it in verbose and overly dramatic terms to her tour group. For example, in describing a water fountain, Fraser proclaimed it "a work of astonishing economy and monumentality ... it boldly contrasts with the severe and highly stylized productions of this form!" The tour is based on a script that pulls from an array of sources: Immanuel Kant’s Critique of Judgment; a 1969 anthology of essays called On Understanding Poverty; and a 1987 article in The New York Times with the headline "Salad and Seurat: Sampling the Fare at Museums".

In Kunst muss hängen ("Art Must Hang") (Galerie Christian Nagel/Cologne, 2001), Fraser reenacted an impromptu 1995 speech by a drunk Martin Kippenberger, word-by-word and gesture-for-gesture.

For Official Welcome (2001)—commissioned by the MICA Foundation for a private reception—Fraser mimicked "the banal comments and effusive words of praise uttered by presenters and recipients during art-awards ceremonies. Midstream, assuming the persona of a troubled, postfeminist art star, Fraser strips down, [...] to a Gucci thong, bra and high-heel shoes, and says, I'm not a person today. I'm an object in an art work."

Her videotape performance Little Frank and His Carp (2001), shot with five hidden cameras in the atrium of the Guggenheim Museum Bilbao, targets the architectural dominance of modern gallery spaces. Using the original soundtrack of an acoustic guide at the museum, she "... writhes with pleasure as the recorded voice draws attention to the undulating curves and textured surfaces of the surrounding space." Fraser's sexual display towards the architecture reveals the eroticism of the words used on the audio tour to describe the museum's structure.

In her videotape performance Untitled (2003), Fraser recorded a hotel-room sexual encounter at the Royalton Hotel in New York with a private collector, who apparently paid close to $20,000 to participate, "'not for sex,' according to the artist, but 'to make an artwork.'" According to Andrea Fraser, the amount that the collector had paid her has not been disclosed, and the $20,000 figure is incorrect. Only five copies of the 60-minute DVD were produced, three of which are in private collections, one being that of the collector with whom she had had the sexual encounter; he had pre-purchased the performance piece in which he was a participant. The contractual agreement, arranged by Friedrich Petzel Gallery, was proposed by Fraser as related to the metaphor of selling art as prostitution. Instead of paying for the encounter itself, the collector paid for the videotape. The work received an great deal of public attention, including in tabloids, an experience the Fraser later described as emotionally difficult, not for the way in which her body was discussed, but how her personal worth was equated with financial value. Frieze named the work No.11 of "The 25 Best Works of the 21st Century".

Fraser's video installation Projection (2008) stages a psychoanalysis session in which the viewer is addressed as analyst, patient, and voyeuristic spectator. The work is based on the transcripts of real psychoanalytic consultations, adapted into twelve monologues and alternated so that Fraser plays the roles of both analyst and patient. Looking directly into the camera, Fraser creates the effect of interacting with the image on the opposite wall but also with the viewer in the middle of the room, who becomes the object of each projection.

Fraser's performance piece, Not Just a Few of Us (2014), performed for Prospect.3, explores the desegregation struggles in New Orleans.

=== Teaching ===
Fraser has taught at University of California, Los Angeles, Maine College of Art & Design, Vermont College of Fine Arts, Whitney Independent Study Program, Columbia University School of the Arts, and the Center for Curatorial Studies, Bard College.

== Exhibitions ==
Fraser's work has been shown in public galleries including the Philadelphia Museum of Art (1989); the Kunstverein München, (1993, 1994); the Venice Biennale (1993); the Sprengel Museum (1998); the Kunstverein Hamburg (2003); the Whitechapel Gallery (2003); the Los Angeles Museum of Contemporary Art (2005); the Frans Hals Museum (2007); and the Centre Pompidou (2009). In 2013, a retrospective of her work was organized by the Museum Ludwig in conjunction with her receipt of the Wolfgang Hahn Prize.

== Collections ==
Fraser's work is held in major public collections including at the Art Institute of Chicago; Centre Pompidou; Fogg Museum; Museum of Contemporary Art, Los Angeles; Museum Ludwig; Museum of Modern Art; Philadelphia Museum of Art; and Tate Modern.

She presented a lecture as part of the "Art and the Right to Believe" lecture series through the Visiting Artists Program at the School of the Art Institute of Chicago in February 2009.

== Recognition ==
Fraser has received fellowships from Art Docent Matter Inc., the Franklin Furnace Fund, the National Endowment for the Arts, and New York Foundation for the Arts. She also received a Foundation for Contemporary Arts Grant to Artist (2017). In December 2019, she was the subject of a major article in The New York Times.
