= Ruth Noack =

German curator and art historian (born 1964)

- Born: 12 January 1964 (age 62); Heidelberg, Germany
- Education: University of Vienna
- Occupations: curator, art historian
- Known for: documenta 12

Ruth Noack (born 12 January 1964) is a German curator and art historian. Noack and Roger M. Buergel, co-curated documenta 12 in Kassel, Germany (16 June - 23 September 2007). In 2019, it was announced that Noack would become the founding executive director of The Corner at Whitman-Walker, a new cultural institution in Washington, D.C., opening in early 2020 as a venue for multidisciplinary artistic expression attached to Whitman-Walker Health.

== Education ==
After graduating from Alten Gymnasium in Bremen she studied art history, audiovisual media and feminist theory in Germany, the U.S., England and Austria. She began lecturing in 1990 and published her first critical work in 1992. In 1999 she completed graduate work in art history at the University of Vienna with a MA-thesis on the subjectification processes in the visual arts, exemplified by the early work of Lynn Hershman. In 2000 she began teaching at the University of Vienna, the University of Applied Arts, Vienna (film theory). Since 2001 Noack has worked on the topic "Construction of Childhood" in the context of a research project. In all of her activities, Noack adopts an interdisciplinary approach that closely incorporates film theory.

== Work ==
Noack's writings have been concerned with subjects including global art and the translocal museum, conceptual art in the East, feminist aesthetics and film theory. Noack’s numerous publications and lectures include monographs on the work of Eva Hesse, Alejandra Riera, Danica Dakic, Ines Doujak, Sanja Ivekovic and Mary Kelly. In 2002-2003 Noack served as President of AICA (International Association of Art Critics) Austria. In 2006 and 2008 she was a member of the jury for the CCAA (Chinese Contemporary Art Award). During the 2012-2013 academic year Noack was Head of Programme, Curating Contemporary Art at the Royal College of Art in London and acted as Research Leader for the EU project "MeLa – European Museums in an age of migrations." Her writing appears regularly in international journals and magazines, including_ springerin_, Texte zur Kunst, Camera Austria and Afterall.

== Exhibitions ==
- 1995 “Scenes of Theory” [Szenen einer Theorie] at Depot, Vienna, examined art and film as agents of theory development. (with Buergel)
- 2000 "Things we don’t understand," Generali Foundation Vienna. Responding to right-wing populism in Austria, the exhibition focused on the political role of aesthetic autonomy. (with Buergel)
- 2001–03 “Formen der Organisation/Organisational Form”, Kunstraum der Universität Lüneburg (Art space of the University of Lüneburg), gallery of the Hochschule für Grafik und Buchkunst (HGB), Leipzig, Galerija Škuc, Ljubljana. (with Buergel)
- 2003 “The Government – Opening Exhibition”, Kunstraum der Universität Lüneburg (Art space of the University of Lüneburg). (with Buergel)
- 2004 “The Government – The University is a Factory”, Kunstraum der Universität Lüneburg (Art space of the University of Lüneburg). (with Buergel)
- 2004 “The Government – Acts upon Acts”, Kunstraum der Universität Lüneburg (Art space of the University of Lüneburg). (with Buergel)
- 2004 “The Government – How do we want to be governed? (Figure and Ground)”, Miami Art Central, Miami. (with Buergel)
- 2005 “The Government – Elysian Spheres of Action”, Secession, Vienna. (with Buergel)
- 2005 “The Government – Be what you want, but stay where you are”, Witte de With, Rotterdam. (with Buergel)
- 2005–07 documenta 12, Kassel. (with Buergel)
- 2008 “Burak Delier, Ines Doujak, Andreas Savva”, Action Field Kodra, Thessaloniki-Kalamaria (2008)
- 2012 "Garden of Learning/Busan Biennale" (contributor).
