= Roger M. Buergel =

German writer

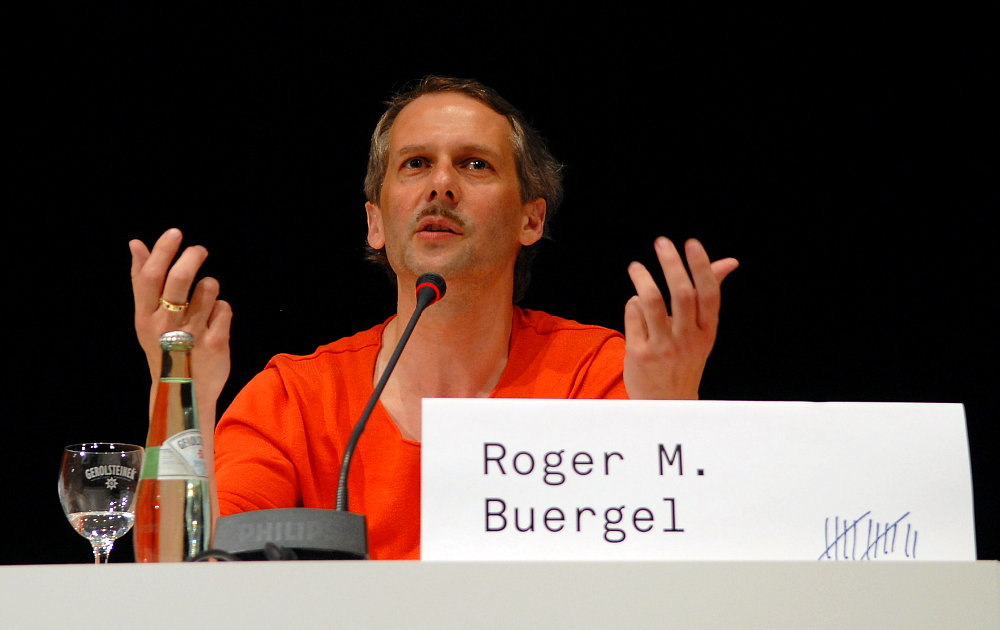
Roger Martin Buergel

Roger M. Buergel (born 1962) is a writer and curator. He was born in Berlin (West).

Buergel received his education at the Institute of Contemporary Art (under Johannes Gachnang) at the Academy of Fine Arts Vienna and subsequently worked as private secretary to Viennese actionist Hermann Nitsch. Since the 1990s Buergel has mounted numerous exhibitions, often in collaboration with his partner Ruth Noack, including documenta 12 in 2007. Throughout his career, Buergel held various teaching posts, most recently as Visiting Professor of Art History at the Art Academy Karlsruhe (2007–09). He served in the years 2012–21 as the Founding Director of the Johann Jacobs Museum in Zurich, an exhibition space and research institution dedicated to the cultural residue of global trade routes.

== Books ==
- Barely Something, exhibition catalogue; Garden of Learning, exhibition catalogue

== Articles ==
- “‘This Exhibition Is an Accusation’: The Grammar of Display According to Lina Bo Bardi” in Afterall, no. 26 spring 2011

== Exhibitions ==
Among the first exhibitions Buergel and Noack organized was in 1995 “Scenes of Theory” [Szenen einer Theorie] at Depot (Vienna), an intertextual exploration of cinema, film theory and art.

- 2000 Things we don't understand, Generali Foundation Vienna (with Noack)
- 2000 Governmentality. Art in conflict with the international hyper-bourgeoisie and the national petty bourgeoisie, Alte Kestner-Gesellschaft (Hannover)
- 2001 The Subject and Power (the lyrical voice), (CHA) Moscow
- 2004 Com volem ser governats? MACBA Museu d’art contemporani, (Barcelona)
- 2002–05 The Government, [[Kunstraum of Lüneburg University]]; MAC Miami Art Central; Witte de With Rotterdam; Secession Vienna (with Noack)
- 2003–07 documenta 12, Kassel
- 2010 Barely Something (a retrospective of Ai Weiwei), Museum DKM, Duisburg
- 2012 Garden of Learning/Busan Biennale
- 2018 Mobile Worlds or The Museum of our Transcultural Present, Museum für Kunst und Gewerbe, Hamburg, https://mobile-welten.org/en/exhibition/
