= Emilija Škarnulytė =

Lithuanian visual artist and filmmaker (born 1987)

- Born: June 2, 1987; Vilnius, Lithuania
- Education: Brera Academy, Kunstakademiet Tromsø
- Movement: Avant-garde Cinema, Installation, Photography
- Awards: Future Generation Art Prize (2019), Ars Fennica Award (2023)

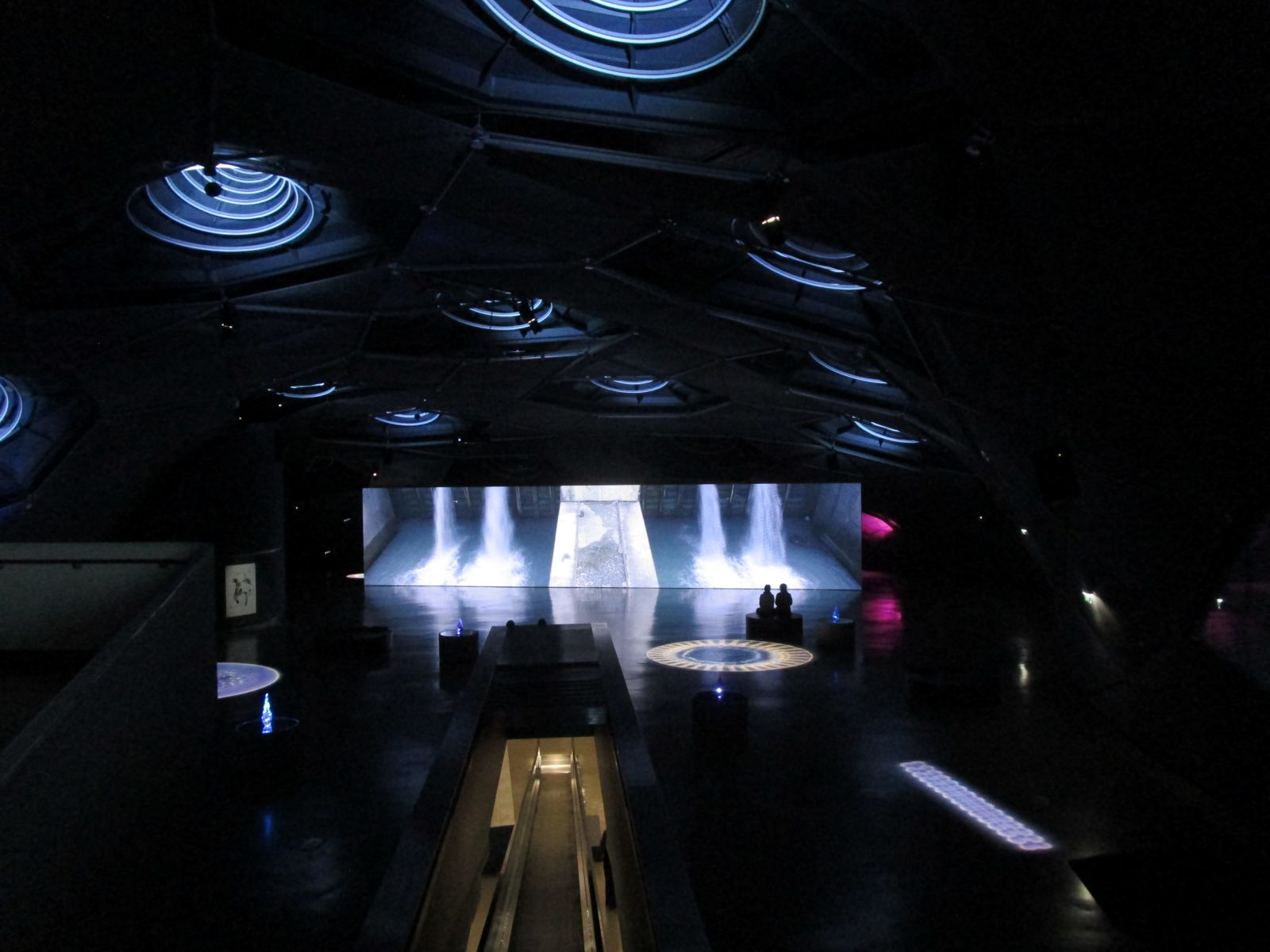
Impression from the exhibition "Waters call me home" (2025)

Emilija Škarnulytė (born 1987) is a visual artist and filmmaker. Existing between the fictive and the documentary, "she works primarily with deep time, from the cosmic and geologic to the ecological and political".

== Biography ==
Škarnulytė holds a BA in sculpture from the Brera Academy of Fine Arts in Milan, Italy, and an MA from Tromsø Academy of Contemporary Art.

She has exhibited at QSO Lens, CAC Contemporary Art Centre, Vilnius (2015); Extended Phenotypes (Viafarini, Milan, 2016); Mirror Matter, Künstlerhaus Bethanien (Berlin, 2017); and Manifold (Podium, Oslo, 2017). Her films have been screened at the 15th International Venice Architecture Biennale (2016), SIART Bolivia International Art Biennial (2016), International Film Festival Rotterdam (Netherlands, 2015), 31st São Paulo Biennial (2014), Whitechapel Gallery (UK, 2015), Ballroom Marfa (US, 2015), Pompidou Film Festival Hors Pistes (France, 2014) and International Short Film Festival Oberhausen (Germany, 2013) among others. Škarnulytė was a 2016 artist-in-residence at Künstlerhaus Bethanien.

She is also the founder and co-director of the Polar Film Lab (with Sarah Schipschack) and a member with Tanya Busse of the artist duo, New Mineral Collective.

== Work ==
In discussing her work with Nadim Samman of Vdrome in December 2018, Škarnulytė said "In my films from the last ten years, I have mostly researched places where contemporary political issues are staged between human and non-human worlds, the shifting boundaries between ecological and cosmic forces. I want to feel out all kinds of non-human and post-human scales in the depths of space and time." Throughout her works, Škarnulytė is often concerned with the "phenomena of neoliberal capitalism so massively distributed across ecosystems that they redefine the traditional notions of thing/place". While playful – perhaps no more so than when she turns herself into a mermaid, or “woman-torpedo”, to swim through a decommissioned NATO submarine base in Sirenomelia – Škarnulytė's short films interrogate the role of people to their new landscapes and questions of what happens in the coming strata, after those roles have served their intended purposes.

These issues are not always at the scale of geologic, but are also more personal and poetic in her work Aldona (2015). In the spring of 1986, the artist's grandmother, Aldona, lost her vision and became permanently blind. The nerves in her eyes had been poisoned. Her doctors claimed that it was probably due to Chernobyl's Nuclear Power Plant explosion. In the film we follow Aldona through a daily sojourn, to Grūtas Park, physically touching both the past and the present. Discussing this work on exhibition at the Kadist in the San Francisco Chronicle, art critic Charles Desmarais wrote, "Emilija Škarnulytė follows a blind woman through a park populated by ghostly stone remnants of the Soviet era in Lithuania. The old woman sees with her hands the silenced heroes who, in life, would have been far out of reach."

Representing Lithuania at XXII Triennale di Milano, Škarnulytė responded to the Triennale's theme of "Broken Nature" by creating work that "invited the audience to reflect on the issue of the cracked relationship between humans and nature by diving into the physical and mythological landscapes of the Cold War".

Meditating on Škarnulytė's body of work, philosopher Timothy Morton remarked, "We’re all mermaids already, we just don’t know it yet".

== Future Generation Art Prize ==
The PinchukArtCentre in Kyiv, Ukraine, named Emilija Škarnulytė the winner of its 2019 Future Generation Art Prize, which recognizes one artist age 35 or younger roughly every other year. She received $100,000, with $60,000 in the form of an unrestricted cash prize. (The other $40,000 is to be used to “fund [the winner’s] artistic practice”, according to a release.) Additionally, Škarnulytė will have a solo show at the museum in 2020. Škarnulytė was recognized for her work t 1/2 (2019), a video installation that deals with ecological disaster and nuclear warfare. Shown in a room with a mirrored ceiling, the video includes 3D scans that allude to architectural structures found at a nuclear power plant in Lithuania and a neutrino observatory in Japan, among other locations.

Commenting on Škarnulytė's work t 1/2, the jury noted that it “found its scale, rhythm, and pace mesmerizing”. “Her use of video expands into a multi-dimensional experience, confronting many of the major issues facing humanity which are often left unspoken. Without being overtly didactic, the work stays open-ended and poetic while raising fundamental questions about where we come from, who we are and where we might end-up.”

== Exhibition ==
- "Waters call me home", 2025/26, Kunsthaus Graz, Austria
