= Aslan Goisum =

Russian contemporary artist (born 1991)

Aslan Gaisumov
- Born: Chechen: ГIойсуман Куьйри воI Аслан; 1991 (age 34–35); Grozny, Chechen Republic, Checheno-Ingush Autonomous Soviet Socialist Republic, USSR
- Education: Institute of Contemporary Art, Moscow; HISK Higher Institute for Fine Arts, Ghent; Rijksakademie van Beeldende Kunsten
- Known for: Video, installation

Aslan Ġoisum, also known as Aslan Gaisumov, (born 1991, Grozny, Checheno-Ingush ASSR, Russia) is an artist whose multidisciplinary practice spans video, installation, sculpture, and works on paper, achieving a progression of forms that are at the same time concrete and open-ended. He creates pictorial and architectural spaces that undermine access to understanding.

== Life ==
Aslan Goisum was born in Grozny in 1991. He graduated from the Institute of Contemporary Art in Moscow in 2012, Higher Institute of Fine Arts in Ghent in 2017, and Rijksakademie van Beeldende Kunsten in Amsterdam in 2019.

The artist's first solo exhibition entitled "Untitled (War)" was held in 2011 at Winzavod Center for Contemporary Art in Moscow. Since then, he has participated in numerous international exhibitions.

== Work ==
In his work, Goisum draws formal references from architecture and cinematography to create environments and images that obliquely suggest the potential of violence: power and its psychological mechanisms are recurring themes in his interdisciplinary practice. He challenges the possibility of communication and understanding, questioning the tools used to achieve it. In their place, he has developed a grammar of materials and forms across various groups of works: the weight and darkness of steel, close-up shots of the human body, views of unresponsive landscapes, text as both substance and structure. His precise visuals and installations are underpinned by modes of thought from other eras and media: literature, poetry, painting, choreography, and music.

His works are in the collections of Stedeljik Museum (Amsterdam); Kadist Art Foundation (Paris, San Francisco); M HKA (Antwerp); Tate Modern (London); Hamburger Kunsthalle (Hamburg); Louis Vuitton Foundation (Paris) as well as in many private collections around the world.

He is represented by Emalin, London, UK.

== Solo exhibitions ==
- 2011 — «Untitled (War)». Moscow Contemporary Art Center Winzavod. Curated by Elena Yaichnikova.
- 2013 — «Aslan Gaisumov». Galerie Zink, Berlin, Germany.
- 2015 — «Memory belongs to the stones». Kromus + Zink, Berlin, Germany.
- 2016 — «People of No Consequence». M HKA, Antwerp, Belgium. Curated by Anders Kreuger.
- 2018 — «Crystals and Shards». Kohta, Helsinki, Finland. Curated by Anders Kreuger.
- 2018 — «All That You See Here, Forget». Emalin, London, UK. Curated by Anna Smolak.
- 2018 — «Dark Shelters». LE CAP Centre d’arts Plastiques, Saint-Fons, France. Curated by Nicolas Audureau.
- 2019 — «If No One Asks». Contemporary Art Gallery, Vancouver, Canada. Curated by Kimberly Phillips.
- 2022 — «Our memories are quite similar but pickled alive in a poison which accompanies objects too as part of this emptiness». P//////AKT, Amsterdam, the Netherlands.
- 2023 — «The Sum of Silence». Emalin, London, UK. Curated by Tosia Leniarska.
- 2024 — «Prism». Lunds Konsthall, Lund, Sweden. Curated by Anders Kreuger.
- 2025 — «Suspect». KINDL Centre for Contemporary Art, Berlin, Germany. Curated by Katrin Becker.

== Key group exhibitions ==
- 2012 — «Under a Tinsel Sun». III Moscow International Biennale for Young Art, Central House of Artists, Moscow, Russian Federation.
- 2012 — «I am who I am». KIT. Düsseldorf, Germany.
- 2012 — «Counter Illusions». Gallery 21, Moscow, Russian Federation.
- 2012 — «Stalker: Art in the Factory». VNIIMETMASH, Moscow, Russian Federation.
- 2012 — «It Seems That Something Is Missing Here». Vinzavod Center of Contemporary Art, Moscow, Russian Federation.
- 2012 — «Meeting The Unknown». Central House of Artists, Moscow, Russian Federation.
- 2012 — «Art for Fake». Gallery K35, Moscow, Russian Federation.
- 2013 — 5th Moscow Biennale. Central Exhibition Hall Manege, Moscow, Russian Federation.
- 2013 — «Summer.Kunst.Fresh». Resident's exhibition, Bad Gastein, Austria.
- 2013 — «Past Imperfect». Festival TodaysArt, The Hague, Netherlands.
- 2014 — «Burning News». Hayward Gallery, London, UK.
- 2014 — «Native Foreigners». Garage Museum of Contemporary Art, Moscow, Russian Federation.
- 2014 — «Generation Start». Cadet Corps, Manifesta 10, St Petersburg, Russian Federation.
- 2014 — «Printed Matter». Museum of Printing, Manifesta 10, St Petersburg, Russian Federation.
- 2014 — «Discontinuous Values». Alania, National Centre for Contemporary Art, Vladikavkaz, Russian Federation.
- 2014 — «Project with Accent». Theatre Open Stage, Moscow, Russian Federation.
- 2015 — «Lines Of Tangency». Museum of Fine Arts, Ghent, Belgium.
- 2015 — «Skulptur 2015». Skulpturenmuseum Glaskasten Marl, Marl, Germany.
- 2015 — «Austeria». BWA SOKOL GALLERY. Nowy Sącz, Poland.
- 2015 — «Our Land/Alien Territory». Central Exhibition Hall Manege, Moscow, Russian Federation.
- 2015 — «The Identity Complex». Alania, National Centre for Contemporary Art, Vladikavkaz, Russian Federation.
- 2015 — «Glasstress 2015 Gotika». Palazzo Franchetti, Venice Biennale, Venice, Italy.
- 2015 — «The World in 2015». UCCA Center for Contemporary Art, Beijing, China.
- 2015 — «Future Generation Art Prize 2014». 21 Shortlisted Artists, Pinchuk Art Centre, Kiev, Ukraine.
- 2016 — «Uncertain States». Akademie der Künste, Berlin, Germany.
- 2016 — «Across the Caucasus». Tbilisi History Museum, Tbilisi, Georgia.
- 2016 — «Experiences of the Imaginary». New Holland, St Petersburg, Russian Federation.
- 2016 — «Fortress Europe». Eastern Baston, KH Space, Brest, Belarus.
- 2016 — «Transgression and Syncretism». ACC. Gwangju, South Korea.
- 2016 — «Höhenrausch». Eigen + Art Lab, Berlin, Germany.
- 2016 — «Greetings from Ghent». Zink Gallery, Waldkirchen, Germany.
- 2017 — «I Am a Native Foreigner». Stedelijk Museum, Amsterdam, The Netherlands.
- 2017 — «Belonging to a Place». SCRAP Metal Gallery, Toronto, Canada.
- 2017 — «A World Not Ours». Kunsthalle Mulhouse, Mulhouse, France.
- 2017 — «Americans 2017». LUMA Westbau, Zurich, Switzerland.
- 2017 — «Heimat and Homeland». Museion, Bolzano, Italy.
- 2017 — «The Haunted House». Cultural Foundation Ekaterina, Moscow, Russian Federation.
- 2017 — «Witness». Galerie Jérôme Poggi, Paris, France.
- 2017 — «Life From My Window». Laura Bulian Gallery, Milan, Italy.
- 2017 — «The Raft. Art Is (Not) Lonely». Mu.ZEE, Ostend, Belgium.
- 2017 — «Hämatli & Patriæ». Museion, Bolzano, Italy.
- 2017 — «Triennial of Russian Contemporary Art». Garage Museum of Contemporary Art», Moscow, Russian Federation.
- 2017 — «Inconvenient Questions». Tartu Art Museum, Tartu, Estonia.
- 2017 — «Bilder Fragen». Centre for Contemporary Art Glass Palace, Augsburg, Germany.
- 2017 — «Nationality». Victoria Gallery, Samara, Russian Federation.
- 2017 — «Lives Between». Kadist Art Foundation, San Francisco, US.
- 2017 — «How To Live Together». Kunsthalle Wien. Vienna, Austria.
- 2018 — «Beautiful World, Where are you?». 10th Liverpool Biennial, Liverpool, UK.
- 2018 — «Everything Was Forever Until It Was No More». 1st Riga Biennale, Riga, Latvia.
- 2018 — «Here We Meet». The Galaxy Museum of Contemporary Art, Chongqing, China.
- 2018 — «Tomorrow Will Be Yesterday». ERTI Gallery, Tbilisi, Georgia.
- 2018 — «Power Nap». Museum of Modern Art. Yerevan, Armenia.
- 2018 — «Belonging to a Place». Embassy of Canada, Washington DC, US.
- 2018 — «One Place After Another». («Удел человеческий», IV сессия.) Jewish Museum and Tolerance Center. Moscow.
- 2019 — «Tell me about ~~yesterday~~ tomorrow». Munich Documentation Centre. Munich, Germany.
- 2019 — «Boundary + Gesture». Wysing Arts Centre, Cambridge, UK.
- 2019 — «After Leaving / Before Arriving». 12th Kaunas Biennale, Kaunas, Lithuania.
- 2019 — «No You Won't Be Naming No Buildings After Me». TENT, Rotterdam, The Netherlands.
- 2019 — «Potentiality». Festival of Political Photography 2019, The Finnish Museum of Photography, Helsinki, Finland.
- 2019 — «Open Ground». Void Gallery, Derry, Northern Ireland.
- 2019 — «The I is Always in the Field of the Other». Evliyagil Museum, Ankara, Turkey.
- 2020 — «The Invented History». KINDL. Berlin, Germany.
- 2020 — «Mourning: On Loss and Change», Hamburger Kunsthalle, Hamburg, Germany.
- 2020 — «Home/Ward Bound/Less». Budapest Gallery, Budapest, Hungary.
- 2020 — «Communicating Difficult Pasts». Latvian National Museum of Art, Riga, Latvia.
- 2021 — «Tenderness of The Unknown». AllArtNow Gallery, Stockholm, Sweden.
- 2022 — «On the Move». Parcum, Leuven, Belgium.
- 2022 — «A War in the Distance». Steirischer Herbst, Graz, Austria.
- 2023 — «As Though We Hid the Sun in a Sea of Stories». Haus der Kulturen der Welt, Berlin, Germany.
- 2025 — «Evidence, Condo London: Emalin hosting Antenna Space». Emalin, London, UK.

== Recognition ==
=== Awards ===
- 2014—Future Generation Art Prize, Ukraine.
- 2016—Laureate of the Innovation Prize in the 'New Generation' category, Russia.
- 2017—Finalist of the Kandinsky Prize in the 'Young Artist' category, Russia.

=== Ratings ===
- 2015 — The artist's works entitled "February 23 / May 10" and "Elimination" were included in the list of "50 Most Important artworks of 2014" compiled by the editors of Aroundart.
- 2016 —included in the list of "Top 10 Most Notable Young [Russian] Artists", compiled by The Art Newspaper Russia.
- 2019 — Forbes rating "30 under 30".
- Russian investment art rating 49ART, "Outstanding contemporary Russian artists under the age of 50."

== Collections ==
- Tate Modern, London, UK.
- Stedeljik Museum, Amsterdam, the Netherlands.
- M HKA, Antwerp, Belgium.
- Hamburger Kunsthalle, Hamburg, Germany.
- Louis Vuitton Foundation, Paris, France.
- Kadist Art Foundation, Paris, France and San Francisco, US.
- Lunds Konsthall, Lund, Sweden.
- National Bank of Belgium, Brussels, Belgium.
