= Markus Zimmermann (sculptor) =

German sculptor

- Born: October 31, 1978 (age 47); Hannover, Germany
- Education: Braunschweig University of Art
- Known for: Sculpture, Performance Art
- Movement: Conceptual art
- Website: "http://www.markuszimmermann.info/"

Markus Zimmermann (born October 31, 1978) is a German sculptor and performance artist.

== Life ==
In 2000 after graduating from high school, Markus Zimmermann began studying fine arts at the Kunstakademie Münster, Germany, in the sculptors class of Timm Ulrichs. For winter semester 2002, he changed to Braunschweig University of Art to Bogomir Ecker. There he completed his studies in 2006 with a diploma and was Masterstudent the following year. During his study research trips to New Zealand, France and Ireland took place. He lives and works in Berlin and Hannover.

== Work ==
Starting from the Wunderkammern of the late Renaissance and the Baroque, Markus Zimmermann has been developing countless small sculptures since 2003. These impress with their wealth of detail and precise design. He combines different materials such as cardboard, paper, plastic films, foam with plaster, wax and paint into new futuristic shapes. The presentation of the small sculptures took place on large shelves or tables, in displays or empty shop windows as room-filling installations, reminding the observers of stores or shops.

While the objects of the Wunderkammern are intended for viewing only, since 2006 Zimmermann has challenged the viewer with peep-boxes to take his art literally into their own hands. The lavishly designed boxes reveal fantastic landscapes and geometric spaces as they look inside. These boxes evoke connotations of theatrical stages or the Merzbau of artist Kurt Schwitters, likewise originating from Hanover. Lateral slits let light into the peep boxes and show the scenes in changing perspectives.

Since 2012 performances have followed. They are primarily characterized by playful interactions with the audience. Markus Zimmermann plays with the audience Mau Mau or bets for money; he destroys sacred objects of his childhood or asks the public to design sculptures themselves. The seemingly harmless performances cite strict rituals of the catholic liturgy and stage universal themes of mythology. In times of easily digitally produced effects and entertainment, Markus Zimmermann manages to create calm moments of mindfulness and presents. Free of ideological platitudes, he translates the views and demands of Joseph Beuys on social sculpture into action.

Since 2013, Markus Zimmermann has also appeared as the initiator of art projects in overarching art genres. In 2013, the Kunstfonds Foundation sponsored the project WELT OHNE ZEIT (World Without Time), a twenty-four-hour performance with 12 artists in the former Czech Cultural Center Berlin. As a team he develops and supervises the project IKONOSTASE in Munich, Berlin and at the Cebit in Hanover.

Zimmermann was one of the co-founders of the Berlin Arts Club in 2006. In 2013 Florian Dietrich, Martin Schepers and Markus Zimmermann founded the artist collective IKONOSTASE.

== Awards ==
In 2010, Markus Zimmermann was awarded the ars viva prize of the Kulturkreis der deutschen Wirtschaft.

== Exhibitions ==
2007

- Die Kunst der Sammelns, Museum Kunstpalast, Düsseldorf

2008

- –zoom+, Künstlerhaus Dortmund
- Schein, Galerie Birgit Ostermeier, Berlin
- An einem Wochenende im September, Schwerin Str. 42, Düsseldorf
- Believe me!, Kunst im Tunnel, Düsseldorf
- Bitte schön!, Kunsthalle Münster

2009

- Idyllismus, Tanzschule, München
- Verleihung Roelfs-Partner-Stipendium, Kunst im Tunnel, Düsseldorf
- verschachtelt, Junge Kunst e. V. Wolfsburg
- Out of the box, Museum van Bommel van Dam, Venlo
- Scales of the universe, Galerie Jeanroch Dard, Paris
- Wer macht die Kunst?, hub:kunst.diskurs e.V. Hannover
- 1000 x Ich, 1000 x Du, Tät, Berlin

2010

- Generating the Preview, Museum Sztuki Lodz
- Magicgruppe Kulturobjek, Bonnefantenmuseum, Maastricht
- ars-viva-Preis 2010 – Labor, Kunstsammlungen Chemnitz
- Bewahrung und Verfall, Deutsches Technikmuseum Berlin
- Larger than life – stranger than fiction, 11.Triennale Kleinplastik, Fellbach
- Leinen los, Herbstausstellung at Kunstverein Hannover
- Die Welt als Modell, Montag Stiftung Kunst und Gesellschaft Bonn
- Schreitend, Hermannshof, Völksen, Völksen

2011

- From Trash to Treasure, Kunsthalle Kiel
- Verbrechen und Bild, Künstlerverein Walkmühle, Wiesbaden
- ars-viva 10/11 Labor, Kunstmuseum Stuttgart

2012

- Magicgruppe Kulturobjekt, Ludwig Forum für Internationale Kunst, Aachen

2013

- 15 Jahre Junge Kunst, Junge Kunst, Wolfsburg
- Glaube, Liebe, Hoffnung, Rubenstrasse 42, Köln
- Laterna Magica, Kunstverein Wolfenbüttel

2014

- Welt ohne Zeit – Turnover, performance at Czech Kulturzentrum Berlin
- IKONOSTASE II – Rettet die Wirtschaft, installation Haus der Deutschen Wirtschaft, Berlin
- Episode 7, another space, Copenhagen

2015

- SUPERFILIALE – marzipan pigs, installation and performance, Simultanhalle Köln
- SUPERFILIALE – Picknick am Berg, installation and performance, KW Institute for Contemporary Art, Berlin
- IKONOSTASE III – Praxis Freiheit, installation and performance at CeBIT, Hannover
- Karma Spin, Performance, frontviews gallery at Leipziger Str. 63, Berlin

2016

- Sukkot, Installation und Performance, Ausstellungsraum D21, Leipzig
- me and you, ARCA, Performance, Emscherkunst 2016 – Emscher Quelle and Dortmunder U
- me and you, Museum ON/OFF, Performance, Centre Georges Pompidou, Paris
- Ruhestörung, Performance, Britzenale Berlin
