= Nina Canell =

Swedish visual artist (born 1979)

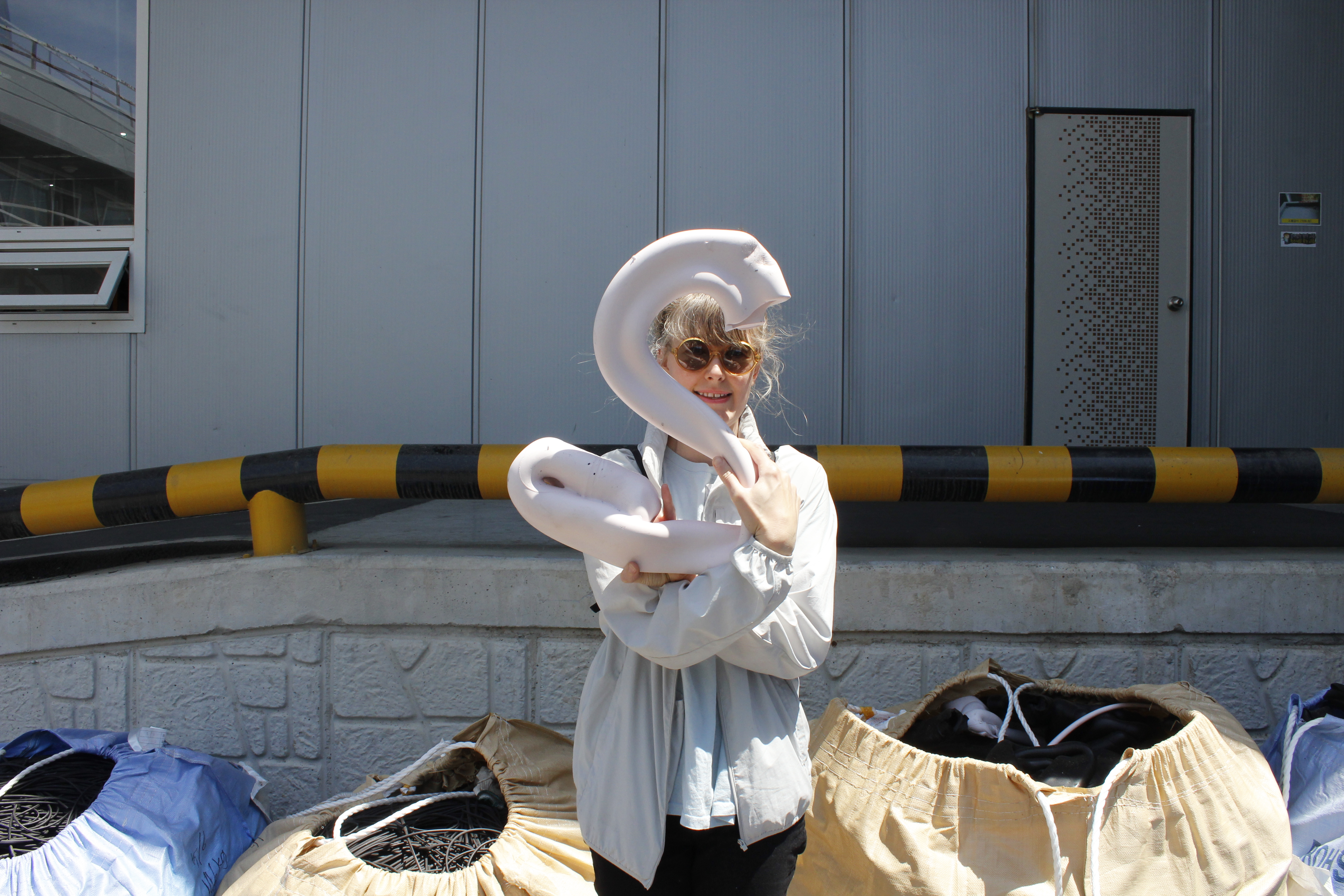
- Nina Canell (2015)
- Born: 1979 (age 46–47); Växjö, Sweden
- Known for: sculpture, installation art

Nina Canell (Växjö, Sweden, 1979) is a sculpture and installation artist born in Växjö, Sweden and educated at the Dún Laoghaire Institute of Art, Design and Technology in Dublin, Ireland. She currently lives and works in Berlin, Germany

== Work ==
Nina Canell's practice concerns the physical and chemical characteristics of materials and found objects as well as their metaphorical and indexical nature.

By placing material forms and immaterial forces into proximity, for example electrifying, heating or moistening wood, copper, plastic or glass, she creates works that embody an interchanging state, a process. Canell's sculptural practice concentrates on this transformative affect: materials and objects are either being animated by a process in her installations or have been the site of a process in that an encounter or traversal has taken place. Despite the articulation of the material phenomena, Canell's works are essentially of indexical nature as they open up a sense for the symbolic capacities of the objects by exploring the relationship between humans, objects and events. This understanding is formally supported by the works’ minimal installation within the space that devoid of any form of monumentality.

Canell has a preference for working with 'poor' materials, ranging from weathered wooden beams, threads, small branches, melon seeds and nails to wires, electric cables, copper pipes and glass jars.

She frequently collaborates with Robin Watkins.

== Solo exhibitions ==
- Nought to Sixty with Robin Watkins at the Institute of Contemporary Arts London, London, UK, 2009
- Nina Canell: The New Mineral at Neuer Aachener Kunstverein, Aachen, Germany, 31 May – 26 July 2009
- Nina Canell: Five Kinds of Water at Kunstverein in Hamburg, Hamburg, Germany, 19 September - 22 November 2009
- Nina Canell: To Let Stay Projecting As A Bit Of Branch On A Log By Not Chopping It Off at Museum Moderner Kunst Stifung Ludwig Wien, Vienna, Austria, 12 November 2010 – 30 January 2011
- Ode to Outer Ends at Kunsthalle Fridericianum, Kassel, Germany, 2011
- Tendrils at the Douglas Hyde Gallery, Dublin, Ireland, 29 September – 4 November 2012
- Into the Eyes Ends of Hair at Cubitt Gallery, London, UK, 23 March - 4 May 2012
- Lautlos with Rolf Julius at Nationalgalerie im Hamburger Bahnhof – Museum fur Gegenwart, Berlin, Germany, 30 November 2012 – 23 June 2013
- Stray Warmings at Midway Contemporary Art, Minneapolis, USA, 15 February – 6 April 2013
- Mid-Sentence at Moderna Museet, Stockholm, Sweden, 27 September 2014 - 6 January 2015
- Dolphin Dandelion, Centre d'art contemporain d'Ivry – le Crédac, Ivry-sur-Seine, France, 21 April – 25 June 2017
- Nina Canell at Kunstmuseum St. Gallen, St. Gallen, Switzerland, 25 August – 25 November 2018
- Nina Canell: Energy Budget at S.M.A.K., Ghent, Belgium, 23 June – 2 September 2018
- Nina Canell: Drag-Out at The David Ireland House, San Francisco, USA, 22 June – 17 August 2019
- Nina Canell: Muscle Memory at Staatliche Kunsthalle Baden-Baden, Baden-Baden, Germany, 6 July – 20 October 2019

== Collections ==
- Frac Grand Large – Hauts-de-France, Dunkerque, France
- Irish Museum of Modern Art, Dublin, Ireland
- Kiasma, Helsinki, Finland
- Moderna Museet, Stockholm, Sweden
