= Cinthia Marcelle =

Brazilian conceptual artist

Cinthia Marcelle (born 1974 in Belo Horizonte, Brazil) is a Brazilian multimedia artist working with photography, video, and installation work. She studied at the Federal University of Minas Gerais. Marcelle currently lives and works in São Paulo, Brazil.

== Art ==
Marcelle's art is mainly characterized by the synthesis and concision of language in her work. She takes inspiration from things she sees in her everyday life such as typical objects, places and their interactions.

She has had solo exhibitions at MoMA PS1, and the Secession. She has also been included in the 2018 Berlin Biennale, the 2013 Istanbul Biennial, the 2012 New Museum Triennial, the 2015 Sharjah Biennial and the 2017 Venice Biennale.

One of her first well seen art pieces were photographs that she had made with the South African artist, Jean Meeran (Capa Morada, 2003). In these photos, Marcelle disappeared into the landscape, dressed in a cape with matching colors so that she and the city elided. In one of her installation pieces, Education by Stone, she pushed numerous rods of chalk, a traditional teaching material, into the school-turned-gallery. This was seen at the Museum of Modern Art in 2016.

Marcelle received an Honorable Mention for her presentation at the Brazilian Pavilion at the 57th Venice Biennale in 2017. She is the recipient of the 2010 Future Generation Prize, and the 2003-2004 Bolsa Pampulha.

== Works ==
- CONFRONTO (2005)
- FONTE 193 (2007)
- Black hole of b series (2008)
- Explanation (2009)
- 475 Volver (2009)
- Reel to Reel (2009)
- This same world over (2009)
- R=O (2009)
- Evasion Plan #3 (2012)
- Project 105: Education by Stone (2016)
- Nau (2017)
- Verdade ou Desafio (2018)

== Exhibitions ==
- No Lone Zone, Tate Modern, UK (2012)
- The Ungovernables, New Museum, New York (2012)
- Infinite Jest, Dundee Contemporary Arts, Dundee, Scotland (2012)
- Mythologies By Proxy, Museu de Arte Moderna, São Paulo (2013)
- Bienal do Mercosul, Mercosul, Brazil (2013)
- Many Places at Once, Wattis Institute for Contemporary Arts, San Francisco (2014)
- Slow Future, Center for Contemporary Art Ujazdów Castle, Warsaw (2014)
- Made by Brazilians, São Paulo, Brazil (2014)
- Project 35: The Last Act, Garage Museum of Contemporary Art, Moscow (2015)
- Video Art in Latin America: Selections from Brazil, The J. Paul Getty Museum, Los Angeles, Getty Research Institute, Miami (2016)
- Art Lessons, Thyssen-Bornemisza Museum, Madrid (2017)
- Working for the Future Past, Seoul Museum of Art (2017)
- A Conjunction of Factors, Barcelona Museum of Contemporary Art, Barcelona (2022)

== Awards ==
- International Prize for Performance, Trento, Italy (2006)
- Annual TrAIN Artist in Residency award, Gasworks, London (2009)
- Future Generation Art Prize, Pinkchuk Art Center, Kyiv, Ukraine (2010)
