= Desali =

- Village
- Location in Arunachal Pradesh, India Desali (India)
- Coordinates: 28.1719°N 95.8245°E
- Country: India
- State: Arunachal Pradesh
- District: Lower Dibang Valley district
- Elevation: 1,240 m (4,070 ft)

Languages
  - Official: English
- Time zone: UTC+05:30 (IST)
- ISO 3166 code: IN-AR
- Vehicle registration: AR

Desali is a village panchayat in the Hunli-Desali tehsil of Lower Dibang Valley district in the north-eastern state of Arunachal Pradesh, India.

== Location ==
It is located on the proposed 2,000-kilometre-long (1,200 mi) Mago-Thingbu to Vijaynagar Arunachal Pradesh Frontier Highway along the McMahon Line.
