= Rodrigo Freitas =

Rodrigo Freitas may refer to:

- Rodrigo Freitas (footballer, born 1998), Brazilian football centre-back
- Rodrigo Freitas (footballer, born 2002), Portuguese football striker for Shelbourne

== See also ==
- Rodrigo (footballer, born 1987), Rodrigo Fagundes Freitas, Brazilian football defender
