= Zhanna Kadyrova =

Ukrainian artist

- Zhanna Kadyrova in 2024
- Born: Zhanna Elfatovna Kadyrova; 1981 (age 44–45); Brovary, Kyiv Oblast, Ukrainian SSR, Soviet Union
- Known for: Sculpture, installation, public art
- Awards: Taras Shevchenko National Prize of Ukraine (2025)

Zhanna Elfatovna Kadyrova (born 1981) is a Ukrainian artist working in sculpture, installation, and public art. She has participated in numerous exhibitions and artistic projects in Ukraine and abroad, and received the Taras Shevchenko National Prize of Ukraine in 2025.

== Biography ==
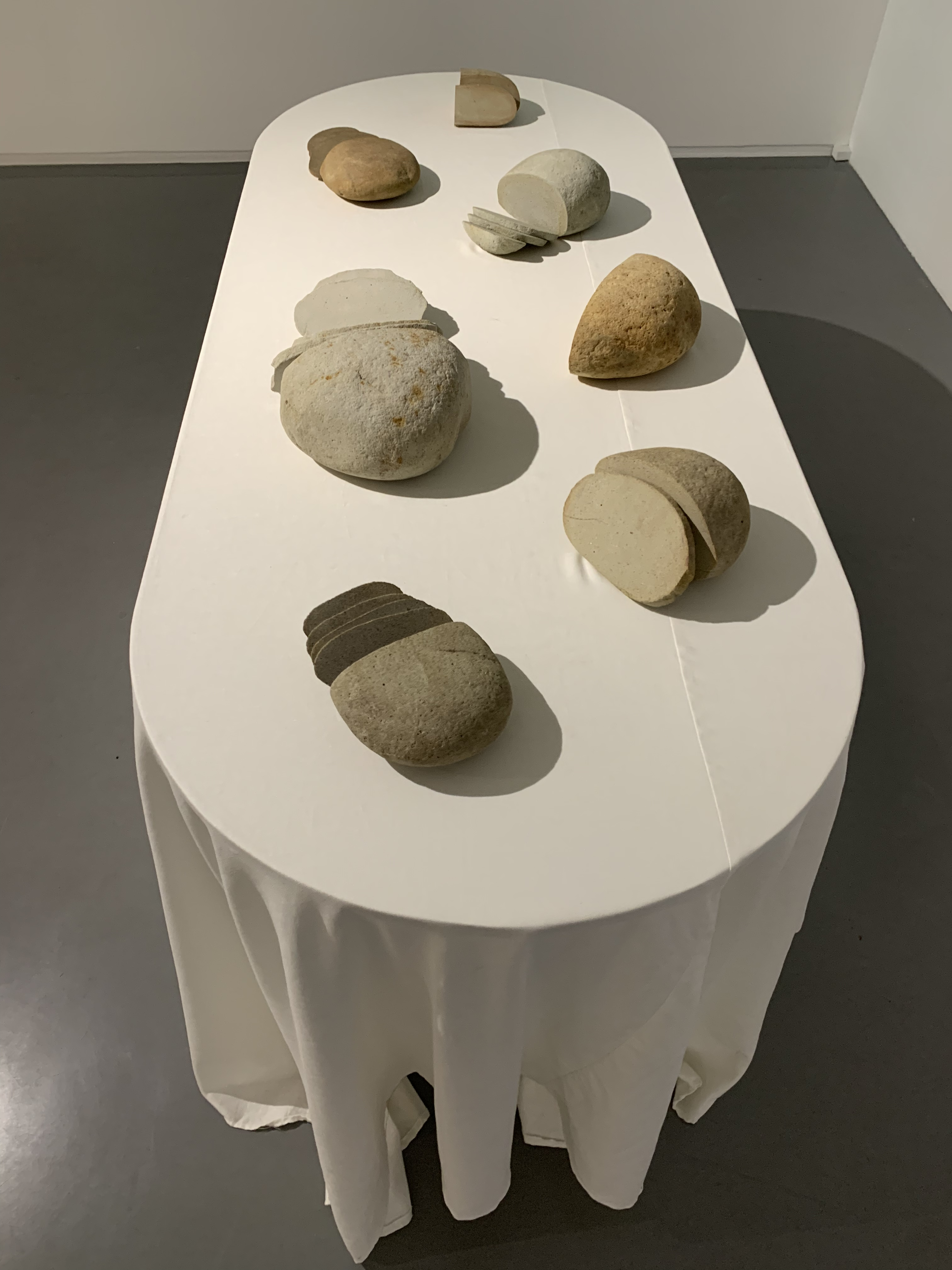
"PALIANYTSIA" by Zhanna Kadyrova, Bangkok Art Biennale 2022

Zhanna Kadyrova was born in 1981 in Brovary, Kyiv Oblast.In 1999, she graduated from the sculpture department of the Taras Shevchenko Kyiv State Art Secondary School.

She was involved in several artistic groups and projects, including R.E.P. (Revolutionary Experimental Space), the punk music group Penoplast, 8=8, Conquered City, City of Winners, No Jury, No Prize, and New History at the Kharkiv Art Museum. She also curated exhibitions at LabGarage in Kyiv.

In 2009, Kadyrova created Monument to a New Monument in Shargorod. She also designed and installed sculptural objects in Kyiv known as Bench-Graphics as part of the Kiev Fashion Park project.

Kadyrova received a special prize from PinchukArtCentre in 2011. In April 2012, she won the Sergey Kuryokhin Prize in the category Art in Public Space for Light Form. In December 2012, she received the Kazimir Malevich Prize, and in 2013 she won the main PinchukArtCentre Prize. She was also nominated for the Women in Arts 2019 award by UN Women in Ukraine.

In 2019, Zhanna Kadyrova participated in the 58th International Biennale di Venezia, taking part in the central exhibition May You Live in Interesting Times curated by Ralph Rugoff. Her contribution, Second Hand, is part of an ongoing project that began in 2014 and uses second‑hand ceramics, tiles, concrete, and other reclaimed materials to create garments and installations that reflect on memory, material history, and the specific urban context of each site. She also presented work related to the long‑running project Market (2017–2019), in which she stalls at art fairs selling food‑like objects made of concrete, ceramic tiles, and natural stone, critiquing the art market by pricing her pieces by weight rather than by conventional art‑market logic.

During the 59th Venice Biennale in 2022, Galleria Continua presented Kadyrova’s exhibition Pallianitsa.

After Russia’s full-scale invasion of Ukraine on February 24, 2022, she had to flee her home and studio in Kyiv and took a refuge in the Carpathian Mountains.

== Selected solo exhibitions ==
- 2006 – Diamonds, Kyiv Center for Contemporary Art, Kyiv, Ukraine.
- 2006 – Diamonds – By Hand!, Regina Gallery, Moscow, Russia.
- 2008 – Invisible Difference ARTStrelka Projects, Moscow, Russia.
- 2009 – Calculation, Kyiv, Ukraine.
- 2011 – Non-Obvious Forms, Small Gallery, Mystetskyi Arsenal, Kyiv, Ukraine.
- 2020 – Market, solo project in the Presents section, The Armory Show, New York, United States, presented by Voloshyn Gallery.
- 2023–2024 – Flying Trajectories, PinchukArtCentre, Kyiv, Ukraine.
- 2024 – Strategic Locations, Galleria Continua, Paris, France.
- 2025–2026 – Avulsion, Arsenal Gallery, Białystok, Poland.
- 2026 – Instrument, Galleria Continua, San Gimignano, Italy.
- 2026 – Sliced Realities, Thomas Mann House (Villa Aurora/Thomas Mann House), Los Angeles, United States.

== Selected group exhibitions ==
- 2006 – 8=8, L Gallery, Moscow, Russia.
- 2006 – Mode R: Russian Formalism Today, Newton Building, Miami, United States.
- 2009 – Conquered City, Regina Gallery, Moscow, Russia.
- 2009 – City of Winners, Victoria Gallery, Samara, Russia.
- 2010 – WC, alternative Cosmoscow program, Krasny Oktyabr, Moscow, Russia.
- 2010 – Tape It, OUI Centre for Contemporary Art, Grenoble, France.
- 2011 – On. Off., Arthouse, Moscow, Russia.
- 2011 – Necessary Art, Gorky Park, Moscow, Russia.
- 2011 – Drill Alert, Knoll Galerie, Viennafair, Vienna, Austria.
- 2011 – Phantom Monuments, Garage Center for Contemporary Culture, Moscow, Russia.
- 2012 – Apocalypse and Renaissance in the Chocolate House, Chocolate House, Kyiv, Ukraine.
- 2012 – Angry Birds, Museum of Modern Art, Warsaw, Poland.
- 2013 – Places. Laureates of the Kazimir Malevich Award, Arsenal Gallery, Białystok, Poland.
- 2013 – Sphères 6, Continua / Les Moulins, Boissy-le-Châtel, France.
- 2019 – 58th International Art Exhibition – La Biennale di Venezia, May You Live in Interesting Times, Venice, Italy.
- 2020 – Fear, Arsenal Gallery, Białystok, Poland.
- 2022 – Unfolding Landscapes, group exhibition, Galleria Continua in collaboration with Art & History Museum.
- 2023 – Arsenal 60! On Collecting, Collection and the Love of Arsenal, Arsenal Gallery, Białystok, Poland.
- 2024 – Climate Security Festival and IHME Helsinki Commission 2024, IHME Helsinki / Finnish Meteorological Institute, Helsinki, Finland.
- 2024 – Handle With Care, Galleria Continua, Boissy-le-Châtel, France (group exhibition).
- 2024 – Border Memory, Uppsala Art Museum, Uppsala, Sweden.
- 2024 – The Ability to Dream, Galleria Continua, San Gimignano / Le Moulin (group exhibition).
