= Hunli =

- Village
- Location in Arunachal Pradesh, India Hunli (India)
- Coordinates: 28°19′18″N 95°58′14″E
- Country: India
- State: Arunachal Pradesh
- District: Lower Dibang Valley district
- Elevation: 1,240 m (4,070 ft)

Languages
  - Official: English
- Time zone: UTC+05:30 (IST)
- ISO 3166 code: IN-AR
- Vehicle registration: AR

Hunli is a town and head office of Hunli-Desali Tehsil of Lower Dibang Valley district in the north-eastern state of Arunachal Pradesh, India.

== Facilities ==
It is a Tehsil headquarter with a school.

== Location ==
It is located on the 2,000-kilometre-long (1,200 mi) proposed Mago-Thingbu to Vijaynagar Arunachal Pradesh Frontier Highway along the McMahon Line, alignment map of which can be seen here and here.

== Media ==
Hunli has an All India Radio Relay station known as Akashvani Hunli. It broadcasts on FM frequencies.

== See also ==
- North-East Frontier Agency
- List of people from Arunachal Pradesh
- Religion in Arunachal Pradesh
- Cuisine of Arunachal Pradesh
- List of institutions of higher education in Arunachal Pradesh
