= 57th Venice Biennale =

2017 art exhibition

- Genre: Art exhibition
- Begins: May 13, 2017
- Ends: November 26, 2017
- Location: Venice
- Country: Italy
- Previous event: 56th Venice Biennale (2015)
- Next event: 58th Venice Biennale (2019)

The 57th Venice Biennale was an international contemporary art exhibition held between May and November 2017. The Venice Biennale takes place biennially in Venice, Italy. Artistic director Christine Macel, the chief curator at the Centre Pompidou, curated its central exhibition, "Viva Arte Viva", as a series of interconnected pavilions designed to reflect art's capacity for expanding humanism. The curator also organized a project, "Unpacking My Library", based on a Walter Benjamin essay, to list artists' favorite books. Macel was the first French director since 1995 and the fourth woman to direct the Biennale. A trend of presenting overlooked, rediscovered, or "emerging dead artists" was a theme of the 57th Biennale.

== Awards ==
- Golden Lion for best national participation: German pavilion (Anne Imhof)
- Special mention as national participation: Brazilian pavilion (Cinthia Marcelle)
- Golden Lion for best artist in the central exhibition: Franz Erhard Walther
- Silver Lion for most promising young artist in the central exhibition: Hassan Khan
- Special mentions: Charles Atlas and Petrit Halilaj
- Golden Lion for lifetime achievement: Carolee Schneemann

== The Diaspora Pavilion ==
The Diaspora Pavilion was an exhibition of 19 contemporary artists held during the 57th Venice Biennale. It was exhibited at the Palazzo Pisani Santa Maria from the 13th of May - 26 November 2017.

The Diaspora Pavilion was established in order to diversify the Venice Biennale and address the lack of representation of people of colour within the visual arts more widely. The Pavilion provided a space for artists from diverse backgrounds to exhibit work exploring the concept of diaspora. This created a critical counter-narrative to the Venice Biennale by questioning the very idea of nationhood and challenging the prevalence of the nation state at the Biennale.

The Diaspora Pavilion was co-founded by David Bailey, Nicola Green, Peter Clayton, and David Lammy, and curated by David Bailey and Jessica Taylor. This was the product of a wider programme - The Diaspora Platform - which provided mentoring workshops and networking opportunities to emerging BAME artists in conjunction with a curators programme established by the International Curators Forum.
