= Generali Foundation =

Australian nonprofit museum and organization

Coordinates: 48.1971°N 16.3677°E

- Established: 1988
- Location: Vienna, Austria
- Website: http://foundation.generali.at

The Generali Foundation was established in 1988 by the Generali Group Austria as a private and non-profit-making art association for the promotion of contemporary art. Situated in Vienna, Austria, it is one of the important museums specialised in collecting and exhibiting conceptual and performance art pieces in different media (documents, video art, installation art etc.).

The collection of the Generali Foundation contains 2100 works by 170 international artists, mainly from the 1960s to today. The Generali Foundation has also edited numerous books and catalogues on conceptual art, performance art, and other contemporary art practices.
