= Minas Gerais State University =

Brazilian university

State University of Minas Gerais
- Universidade do Estado de Minas Gerais
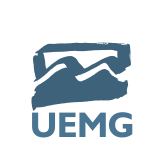
- Other names: UEMG
- Motto: Unidade na diversidade
- Motto in English: Unity in diversity
- Type: Public University
- Established: 1989
- President: Lavínia Rosa Rodrigues
- Vice-president: Thiago Torres
- Administrative staff: 1,418 (2004)
- Undergraduates: 20,956 (2017)
- Postgraduates: 1,331 (2017)
- Location: Belo Horizonte; Barbacena; Carangola; Diamantina; Frutal; Ibirité; João Monlevade; Lavras; Passos; Poços de Caldas; Ubá, Minas Gerais, Brazil; 19.8751°S 43.9700°W
- Website: www.uemg.br
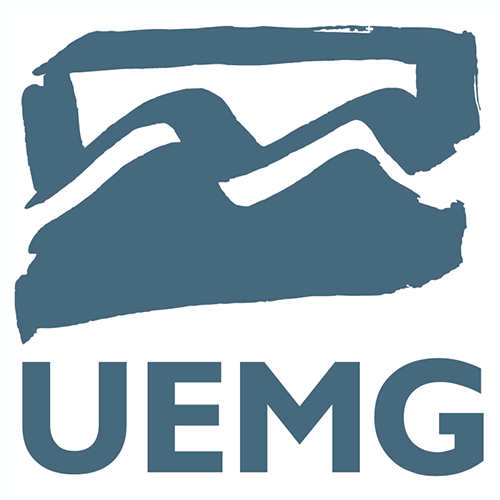

The State University of Minas Gerais. (Portuguese: Universidade do Estado de Minas Gerais, UEMG) is a Brazilian public university. It is the third largest university in the state of Minas Gerais, second only to the Federal University of Minas Gerais and the Federal University of Uberlândia. It was founded in 1989 in Belo Horizonte, Minas Gerais, Brazil. Besides Belo Horizonte, its campuses are distributed across several cities in the Minas Gerais states.

== History ==
UEMG was founded by a regulation from Minas Gerais state constitution from 1989. which allowed the independent institutions of higher education owned by the state government to collaborate, or to be absorbed as UEMG's campi. Those institutions were the following:

- Fundação Faculdade de Filosofia, Ciências e Letras de Carangola
- Fundação Educacional do Vale do Jequitinhonha
- Fundação de Ensino Superior de Passos Visite o Portal FESP
- Fundação Educacional de Lavras
- Fundação de Ensino e Pesquisa do Sul de Minas
- Fundação Educacional de Divinópolis
- Fundação Educacional de Patos de Minas
- Fundação Educacional de Ituiutaba
- Fundação Cultural Campanha da Princesa

In addition to the institutions owned by the Minas Gerais state, the following public institutions were also incorporated:

- Fundação Mineira de Arte Aleijadinho (FUMA)
- Fundação Escola Guignard
- Curso de Pedagogia - Instituto de Educação
- Serviço de Orientação e Seleção Profissional

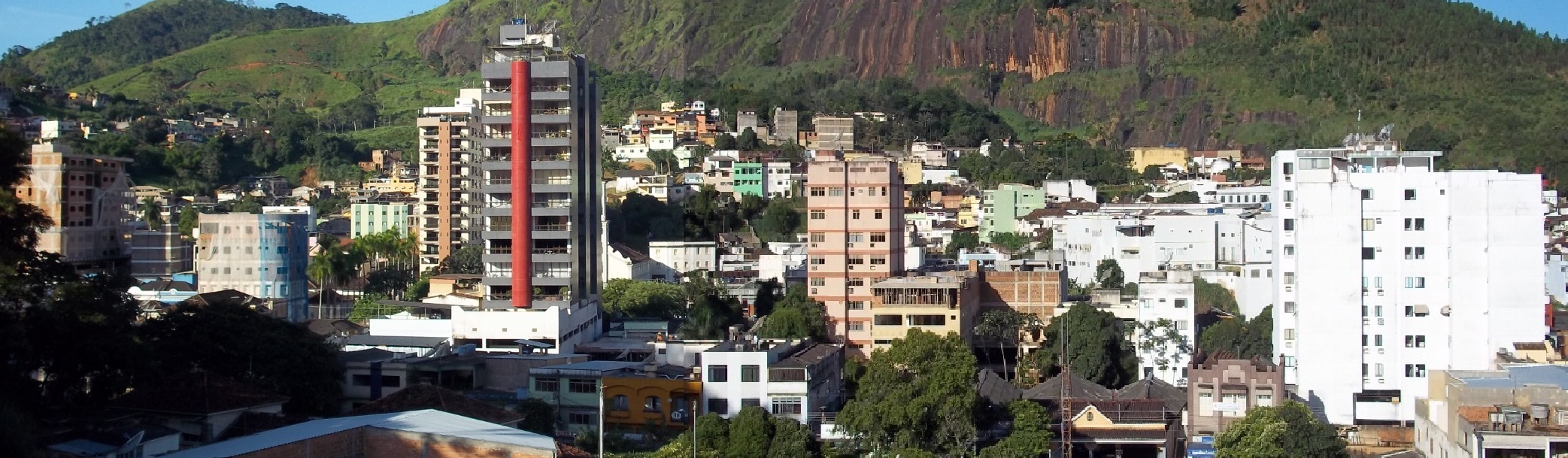
Carangola

== See also ==
- Federal University of Minas Gerais
- List of state universities in Brazil
