= Antonio Obá =

Brazilian artist

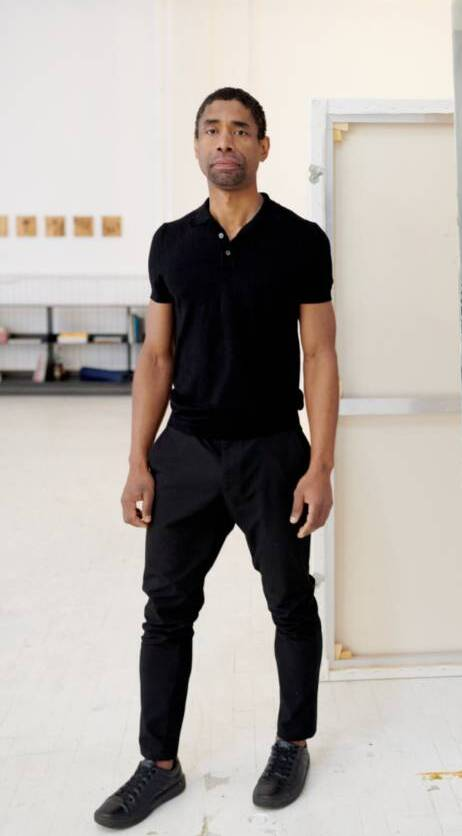
- Born: 1983 (age 42–43); Ceilândia, Federal District, Brazil
- Known for: Painting, Ceramics, Sculpture, Installation
- Notable work: “Wade in the Water II” (2020)

Antonio Obá (born 1983) is a contemporary artist from Ceilândia, Brazil. He has participated in individual and collective exhibitions since 2001 with works involving the body, personal experiences, and the revisiting of historical episodes, particularly in relation to Brazilian iconographies and significant events in the struggle for the rights of Black people. His works feature in international collections including the Tate Modern, Pinault Collection, Fondazione Sandretto Re Rebaudengo.

== Work ==
Engaging in painting, sculpture, photography, installations, video, and performance art, Obá's works widely revolve around the affirmation of the body, engaging with ideas of Blackness, racism, religion, and eroticism. Obá has described his work as being concerned with reclaiming his African heritage in a society that has sought to dilute Black culture.

Obá's work often explores the relationship between religion and the body. Being Catholic is a strong part of Obá's identity. However, his art serves as a space where he can remain a Catholic but, according to the artist, escape from the rules and injustices of organized religion to imagine redemption of the Black body from the vestiges of slavery and reductive eroticization.

In 2020, Obá created a large-scale painting titled “Wade in the Water II” as an homage to George Floyd, whose name has become synonymous with the Black Lives Matter movement. The painting depicts Floyd transcending traditional depictions of Black bodies in water, taking on the powers of Lemanjá, a central Orixá deity in the Candomblé religion. “Wade in the Water II” was exhibited at the Pinacoteca de São Paulo.

In 2024, his work was included in One Becomes Many, a group show at the Pérez Art Museum Miami, Florida, of Afro-Brazilian artists considering diasporic religious practices and visual arts, His artwork was showcased alongside objects by Rosana Paulino, Emanoel Araujo, Paulo Nazareth, and Sonia Gomes, among others.

== Permanent collections ==
Obá's works are part of several collections worldwide, including the MASP Museu de Arte Moderna de São Paulo, Museu de Arte Moderna do Rio de Janeiro, Pinacoteca do Estado de São Paulo, Pinault Collection, Pérez Art Museum Miami, X Museum, Museo Reina Sofia, Fondazione Sandretto Re Rebaudengo, Blenheim Art Foundation, Tate Modern, Instituto Moreira Salles.
