= PIPA Prize =

Brazilian arts award

- Sponsored by: PIPA Institute and The PIPA Foundation UK
- Date: 2010 onwards annually
- Location: Rio de Janeiro, RJ
- Country: Brazil
- Hosted by: MAM/RJ / Paco Imperial do Rio de Janeiro
- Website: http://www.pipaprize.com

PIPA Prize is a Brazilian arts award of the PIPA Institute. From 2010 to 2018, PIPA had a partnership with the Museum of Modern Art of Rio de Janeiro – MAM-Rio. In 2019, the PIPA Prize's exhibition was held at Villa Aymoré, in Rio de Janeiro, Brazil.

The prize was created to promote Brazilian art and artists by stimulating the domestic contemporary art production; motivating and supporting new (but not necessarily young) Brazilian artists. Although it supports up-and-coming artists, the PIPA Prize's goal is not to discover new talents, but to recognize new Brazilian contemporary artists that already have a critical following and a place in the art market.

== Overview ==
There are no entries to run for the Prize. The artists that take part in the PIPA Prize are nominated by the Nominating Committee. Each member of the Committee selects up to three artists or art collectives that work in any media. During the 2010 to 2012 editions, each member could nominate up to five artists.

All of the artists selected by the Nominating Committee are showcased in a printed catalog and get a profile page in the award's website. Of these, four finalists are selected to participate in an exhibition. From 2010 to 2018, the exhibition was held at MAM-Rio and each finalist receive a donation of R$12.000,00 for the preparation of the show. In 2019, the Finalist's Exhibition was held at Villa Aymoré, Rio de Janeiro.

== Structure ==
=== Board ===
The Board is the PIPA's senior management body, composed of five to eight members, including representatives of PIPA Institute and renowned art experts invited for each edition.

The Board is responsible for selecting the four finalists from the nominated artists. The Board also nominates the members of the Nominating Committee and the Award Jury.

=== Nominating Committee ===
The Nominating Committee is a set of 20 to 40 art experts, invited in each edition, by the PIPA Board. They can be Brazilian or foreign artists, art critics, collectors, gallerists, or curators.

=== Award Jury ===
A group of five to seven members invited by the PIPA Board who will select the winner of PIPA amongst the four finalists. Their decision is based on the artists' portfolio, career, works presented at the exhibition and the role that the award would play in their trajectory as artists.

== Award categories ==
In 2019, some changes concerning the award categories and donations were made: the donations were redistributed and the category PIPA Popular Vote Exhibition, which awarded the most voted artist during the exhibition at MAM-Rio with R$24,000, was eliminated.

Since 2019, each of the four (4) finalists receive a donation of R$30.000,00.

=== PIPA ===
Main category in which the winner is determined by the Award Jury. Since 2019, the winner receives an extra donation of R$30.000,00 to develop a project (which could be an exhibition, a publication, a research travel, an artistic residency, etc.).

From 2010 to 2018, the winner received a donation of R$130.000,00 (R$12,000.00 being awarded to the artist when selected as a finalist). Part of that amount was used to fund an artistic residency programme, for three months, at Residency Unlimited, New York^{[10]}.

Since the postponed exhibition in 2020, the PIPA Board has taken over the selection process for Awarded Artists. Four winners are chosen from the artists selected by the Nominating Committee.

=== PIPA Online ===
Category in which all artists from the current edition can participate. The winner is chosen by the public in an online voting. The most voted artist by the end of the 2nd round receives a donation of R$15.000,00.

From 2012 onward, the voting process happens in two shifts: artists that receive more than 500 votes on the first round go on to the second one, where a winner is determined. First place wins a cash prize of R$10,000, the runner-up receives R$5,000.

From 2014 to 2016, the winning artist would also participate in a two month long art residency at Instituto Sacatar, in Bahia.

In 2014 and 2015, the Online category was split up into two distinct categories: PIPA Online, where a juri determined the winner among all nominated artists; and PIPA Popular Online, where the winning artists was selected by popular vote on the award's website.

In 2016, PIPA Online returns to have one category only, awarding the first and the second most voted artists with R$10.000 and R$5.000, respectively.

In 2018, a change was made in the voting system: a minimum of three mandatory votes was established. The three-votes system was thought to encourage the public to search more and more about the artist's work, allowing artists who live outside the main capitals of the country to have their work known and discovered.

Since 2021, PIPA Online awards two winning artists with R$5,000 each.

== Editions ==
=== PIPA 2024 (15th edition) ===
Winners:

- PIPA Awarded Artists: Aislan Pankararu, Aline Motta, enorê, Nara Guichon
- PIPA Online: Yacunã Tuxá and Samuel Macedo

Nominating Committee: Adele Nelson, Alessandra Ferrari, Ana Roman, Bitu Cassundé, Daniel Rangel, Els Lagrou, Hilda de Paulo, Isabel Portella, Josué Mattos, Julia Borges Araña, Lourival Cuquinha, Luana Vitra, Lucas Albuquerque, Luiz Chrysostomo, Maria Amélia Bulhões, Miguel Chikaoka, Moacir dos Anjos, Orlando Maneschy, Paulo Henrique Silva, Priscila Arantes, Raquel Nava, Renata Tupinambá, Sara Seilert, Silvana Bahia.

=== PIPA 2023 (14th edition) ===
Winners:

- PIPA Awarded Artists: Glicéria Tupinambá, Helô Sanvoy, Iagor Peres, Luana Vitra
- PIPA Online: Retratistas do Morro and André Mendes

Nominating Committee: Berna Reale, Carla Oliveira, Claudio Cretti, Coletivo Coletores, Cristiana Tejo, Christiane Laclau, Daniela Labra, Denilson Baniwa, Douglas de Freitas, Felipe Scovino, Germano Dushá, Giselle Beiguelman, Jean Carlos Azuos, Josi, Luciana Solano, Marcela Bonfim, Mariano Klautau Filho, Pablo Lafuente, Rachel Vallego, Raphael Fonseca, Renata Azambuja, Renata Felinto, Ricardo Fernandes, Ronaldo de Oliveira Corrêa, Suzete Venturelli, UYRA, Vanda Klabin, Vitória Cribb.

=== PIPA 2022 (13th edition) ===
Winners:

- PIPA Awarded Artists: Coletivo Coletores, Josi, Vitória Cribb, UÝRA
- PIPA Online: Eugênia França and Samantha Canovas

Nominating Committee: Adele Nelson, Alice Miceli, Ana Roman, Cinara Barbosa, Claudinei Roberto, Denilson Baniwa, Douglas de Freitas, Eder Chiodetto, Fernanda Lopes, Fersen Lamas Lambranho, Giselle Beiguelman, Igor Simões, Jacqueline Medeiros, Josué Mattos, Lu Solano, Marcela Bonfim, Maria Amélia Bulhões, Mariano Klautau Filho, Marta Mestre, Michelle Sommer, Moacir dos Anjos, Naine Terena, Rachel Cecília de Oliveira, Tatiana Blass, Virginia de Medeiros.

=== PIPA 2021 (12th edition) ===
Winners:

- PIPA Selected Artists: Castiel Vitorino Brasileiro, Denilson Baniwa, Ilê Sartuzi, Marcela Bonfim
- PIPA Online: Daiara Tukano and Ruth Albernaz

Nominating Committee: Ana Avelar, Cadu, Catarina Duncan, Claudio Mubarac, Christiane Laclau, Daniela Labra, Fabiana Lopes, Gê Viana, Guy Amado, Hélio Menezes, Marcelo Reis, Mariano Klautau Filho, Marina Câmara, Maxwell Alexandre, Miguel Chikaoka, Naine Terena, Paulo Reis, Randolpho Lamonier, Raphael Fonseca, Renata Felinto, Roberto Vinhaes, Suzette Venturelli, Tadeu Chiarelli.

=== PIPA 2020 (11th edition - The exhibition postponed to 2021) ===
Winners:

- PIPA: All four finalists declared winners, prize money split between them.
- PIPA Online: Isael Maxakali

Finalists: Gê Viana, Maxwell Alexandre, Randolpho Lamonier, Renata Felinto

Nominating Committee: Ana Candida Avelar, Anna Bergamasco, Aruan Braga, Bené Fontelles, Bernardo Faria, Carlos Eduardo Bitu Cassundé, Claudia Saldanha, Douglas de Freitas, Elida Tessler, Gabriela Motta, Guerreiro do Divino Amor, Gustavo Wanderley, Isabella Lenzi, Jacqueline Medeiros, Keyna Eleison, Leno Veras, Marcos Moraes, Maria do Carmo M. P. de Pontes, Mariano Klautau Filho, Marina Câmara, Matias Mesquita, Oliver Basciano, Raphael Fonseca, Ricardo Fernandes, Sandra Hegedüs, Wagner Barja.

=== PIPA 2019 (10th edition) ===
Winners:

- PIPA: Guerreiro do Divino Amor
- PIPA Online: Denilson Baniwa

Finalists: Berna Reale, Cabelo, Guerreiro do Divino Amor, Jaime Lauriano

Nominating Committee: Agnaldo Farias, Alessio Antoniolli, Amanda Abi Khalil, Ana Avelar, Bárbara Wagner, Beatriz Lemos, Camila Bechelany, Carlos Vergara, Cinara Barbosa, Clarissa Diniz, Claudia Calirman, Cristiana Tejo, Fernanda Pitta, Frances Reynolds, Gabriela Davies, Gabriela Motta, Jailton Moreira, Luciana Solano, Lucinda Bellm, Luiz Braga, Marilia Panitz, Marisa Mokarzel, Michelle Sommer, Pablo Léon de la Barra, Paulo Miyada, Thereza Farkas, Tiago Mesquita, Thiago de Paula Souza, Vanda Klabin, Virginia de Medeiros.

Award Jury: Luiz Camillo Osorio, Jessica Gogan, Raphael Fonseca, Regina Silveira and Tadeu Chiarelli.

=== PIPA 2018 (9th edition) ===
Winners:

- PIPA: Arjan Martins
- PIPA Popular Vote Exhibition: Arjan Martins
- PIPA Online: Íris Helena (1st place), Babu78 (2nd place) and extra

Finalists: Arjan Martins, avaf (Eli Sudbrack), Romy Pocztaruk, Vivian Caccuri

Nominating Committee: Ana Elisa Cohen, Aline de Figueiredo Espínola, André Severo, Bernardo José de Souza, Bernardo Mosqueira, Carlos Eduardo Bitu Cassundé, Catalina Lozano, Felipe Scovino, Fernanda Brenner, Fernando Oliva, Fersen Lamas Lambranho, Francisco Dalcol, Gabriela Davies, Gê Orthof, Germano Dushá, Heloisa Espada, Hena Lee, Jailson de Souza, Jaqueline Martins, José Rufino, Júlia Rebouças, Leda Catunda, Marc Pottier, Marta Mestre, Orlando Maneschy, Raphael Fonseca, Renata Azambuja, Rosângela Rennó, Sérgio Bruno Martins.

Award Jury: Fernando Cocchiarale, Iole de Freitas, Michelle Somer, Luiz Camillo Osorio, Paulo Miyada.

=== PIPA 2017 (8th edition) ===
Winners:

- PIPA: Bárbara Wagner
- PIPA Popular Vote Exhibition: Éder Oliveira
- PIPA Online: Jorge Luiz Fonseca (1st place), Musa Michelle Mattiuzi (2nd place)

Finalists: Antonio Obá, Bárbara Wagner, Carla Guagliardi, Éder Oliveira

Nominating Committee: Alice Miceli, Ana Candida de Avelar, Anna Bergamasco, Claudia Saldanha, Claudio Mubarac, Consuelo Bassanesi, Daniel Senise, Felipe Ribeiro, Frances Reynolds, Francisco Dalcol, Gabriela Kremer Motta, Gabriela Salgado, João Laia, Josué Mattos, Kaira Cabañas, Marina Câmara, Marta Mestre, Flavia Gimenes, Michelle Sommer, Paulo Nazareth, Paulo Vieira, Tanya Barson, Thyago Nogueira, Vânia Leal Machado, Waldir Barreto Filho.

Award Jury: Leda Catunda, Marcelo Campos, Consuelo Bassanessi, Fernando Cocchiarale, and Luiz Camillo Osorio.

=== PIPA 2016 (7th edition) ===
Winners:

- PIPA: Paulo Nazareth
- PIPA Popular Vote Exhibition: Paulo Nazareth
- PIPA Online: Jaider Esbell (1st place), Arissana Pataxó (2nd place)

Finalists: Clara Ianni, Gustavo Speridião, Luiza Baldan, Paulo Nazareth

Nominating Committee: André Severo, Cadu, Carlito Carvalhosa, Caroline Carrion, Catherine Petitgas, Cauê Alves, Fabio Faisal, Gabriel Pérez-Barreiro, Guilherme Gutman, Jacopo Visconti, Jesús Fuenmayor, Jones Bergamim, José Rufino, Kiki Mazzucchelli, Lenora de Barros, Lisette Lagnado, Luiza Teixeira de Freitas, Manuel Neves, Maria Ines de Almeida, Maria Iovino, Max Perlingeiro, Michael Ashbury, Monica Hoff, Pablo Leon de la Barra, Paulo Miyada, Rosangela Rennó, Solange Farkas, Virginia de Medeiros.

Award Jury: Fernando Cocchiarale, Marisa Flórido, Júlia Rebouças, Milton Machado, and Luiz Camillo Osorio.

=== PIPA 2015 (6th edition) ===
Winners:

- PIPA: Virginia de Medeiros
- PIPA Popular Vote Exhibition: Virginia de Medeiros
- PIPA Online: Luciana Magno
- PIPA Popular Online: Ana Ruas

Finalists: Cristiano Lenhardt, Leticia Ramos, Marina Rheingantz, Virginia de Medeiros

Nominating Committee: Alejandra Hernández Muñoz, Alice Miceli, Aline Figueiredo Espíndola, Carlos Eduardo Bitu Cassundé, Daniel Rangel, Daniela Labra, Felipe Scovino, Fernanda Brenner, Fernanda Lopes, Gabriela Kremer Motta, Guilherme Simões de Assis, Janaina Melo, Josué Mattos, Júlia Rebouças, Luisa Duarte, Manuela Moscoso, Mara Fainziliber, Marcelo Rezende, Maria Montero, Marisa Mokarzel, Marta Mestre, Orlando Maneschy, Pablo Lafuente, Pedro Barbosa, Tadeu Chiarelli, Vanda Klabin.

Award Jury: Cauê Alves, Gilberto Chateaubriand, Luiz Camillo Osorio, Pablo Leon de La Barra, Rosangela Rennó

=== PIPA 2014 (5th edition) ===
Winners:

- PIPA: Alice Miceli
- PIPA Popular Vote Exhibition: Alice Miceli
- PIPA Online: Paulo Nimer Pjota
- PIPA Popular Online: Diego de Santos

Finalists: Alice Miceli, Daniel Steegmann Mangrané, Thiago Martins de Melo, Wagner Malta Tavares

Nominating Committee: Agustin Pérez Rubio, Alejandra Hernández Muñoz, Alexia Tala, Alfredo Setubal, Antonio Manuel, Beatriz Milhazes, Cadu, Carlos Eduardo Bitu Cassundé, Catherine Petitgas, Charles Watson, Cristiana Tejo, Daniela Labra, Fabio Cypriano, Fabio Szwarcwald, Fernando Oliva, Fersen Lamas Lambranho, Guilherme Simões de Assis, Heitor Reis, Jacqueline Jappur Plass, Jesús Fuenmayor, Jorge Menna Barreto, José Resende, Kaira M. Cabañas, Luciana Brito, Luiz Augusto Teixeira de Freitas, Luiz Schymura, Marisa Mokarzel, Paulo Miyada, Paulo Reis, Renata Azambuja, Tatiana Blass.

Award Jury: Agnaldo Farias, Angelo Venosa, Flora Süssekind, Gilberto Chateaubriand, Luiz Camillo Osorio.

=== PIPA 2013 (4th edition) ===
Winners:

- PIPA: Cadu
- PIPA Popular Vote Exhibition: Camila Soato
- PIPA Online: Shima (1st place), Marco Antonio Portela (2nd place)

Finalists: Cadu, Camila Soato, Berna Reale, Laercio Redondo

Nominating Committee: Alexia Tala, Artur Fidalgo, Catalina Lozano, Cristiana Tejo, Daniel Rangel, Eduardo Brandão, Felipe Scovino, Fernando Cocchiarale, Guilherme Bueno, Heitor Reis, Irene Small, Jesús Maria Carrillo, Jose Ignacio Roca, Kaira Cabañas, Ligia Canongia, Luiz Augusto Teixeira de Freitas, Marcio Fainziliber, Marcius Galan, Marisa Mokarzel, Paulo Reis, Paulo Vieira, Regina Melim, Renata Azambuja, Sérgio Martins, Thereza Farkas.

Award Jury: Carlos Vergara, Eungie Joo, Gilberto Chateaubriand, Luiz Camillo Osorio, Moacir dos Anjos

=== PIPA 2012 (3rd edition) ===
Winners:

- PIPA: Marcius Galan
- PIPA Popular Vote Exhibition: Rodrigo Braga
- PIPA Online: Berna Reale (1st place), Tinho (2nd place)

Finalists: Marcius Galan, Rodrigo Braga, Matheus Rocha Pitta, Thiago Rocha Pitta

Nominating Committee: Agustin Perez Rubio, Alejandra Hernandez Munoz, Alexia Tala, Ana Paula Cohen, Carlito Carvalhosa, Carlos Eduardo Bitu Cassundé, Carlos Vergara, Carolina Dias Leite, Daniela Labra, Daniela Name, Denise Gadelha, Eduardo Frota, Fabio Szwarcwald, Fernando Oliva, Frederico Coelho, Inti Guerrero, Jailson de Souza, Jochen Volz, Julieta Gonzalez, Lenora de Barros, Luciana Caravello, Marcio Lobão, Maria Iovino, Marisa Mokarzel, Matthew Wood, Michael Asbury, Pablo Leon de la Barra, Paulo Pasta, Paulo Reis, Regina Melim, Tatiana Blass, Tiago Mesquita, Tuca Nissel.

Award Jury: Gilberto Chateaubriand, Luiz Camillo Osorio, Moacir dos Anjos, Rowan Geddis, Waltércio Caldas.

=== PIPA 2011 (2nd edition) ===
Winners:

- PIPA: Tatiana Blass
- PIPA Popular Vote Exhibition: Tatiana Blass
- PIPA Online: Iuri Sarmento

Finalists: André Komatsu, Eduardo Berliner, Jonathas de Andrade, Tatiana Blass

Nominating Committee: Agnaldo Farias, Carlos Eduardo Bitu Cassundé, Catalina Lozano, Cauê Alves, Cristiana Tejo, Daniel Roesler, Daniela Labra, Daniela Name, Fabio Cypriano, Fernanda Feitosa, Fernando Cocchiarale, Gê Orthof, Jailton Moreira, José Rufino, Laura Marsiaj, Léo Bahia, Lorenzo Mammì, Luisa Duarte, Luiz Zerbini, Marcio Botner, Marília Panitz, Michael Asbury, Paulo Darzé, Paulo Venâncio Filho, Paulo Vieira, Renata Lucas, Ricardo Trevisan, Solange Farkas, Susan May, Tadeu Chiarelli, Victoria Noorthoom.

Award Jury: Gilberto Chateaubriand, Luiz Camillo Osorio, Rodrigo Moura, Rowan Geddis.

=== PIPA 2010 (1st edition) ===
Winners:

- PIPA: Renata Lucas
- PIPA Popular Vote Exhibition: Marcelo Moscheta
- PIPA Online: Ana Paula Oliveira

Finalists: Renata Lucas, Marcelo Moscheta, Marcius Galan, Cinthia Marcelle

Nominating Committee: Agnaldo Farias, Artur Lescher, Cristiana Tejo, Daniel Senise, Eduardo Leme, Elida Tessler, Ernesto Neto, Fernanda Feitosa, Franklin Pedroso, Guilherme Bueno, Iole de Freitas, Jones Bergamin, Jorge Menna Barreto, Jose Ignacio Roca, José Olympio Pereira, Juliana Cintra, Luiz Braga, Luiz Guilherme Vergara, Luiz Schymura, Marcia Fortes, Marga Pasquali, Mariana Moura, Marta Fadel, Milton Machado, Moacir dos Anjos, Paulo Reis, Paulo Sergio Duarte, Rina Carvajal, Rodrigo Moura, Tanya Barson, Tiago Mesquita, Victoria Noorthoorn.

Award Jury: Antônio Dias, Catalina Lozano, Gilberto Chateaubriand, Lisette Lagnado, Luiz Camillo Osorio.
