= Mendes Wood DM =

Art gallery in São Paulo, Brazil

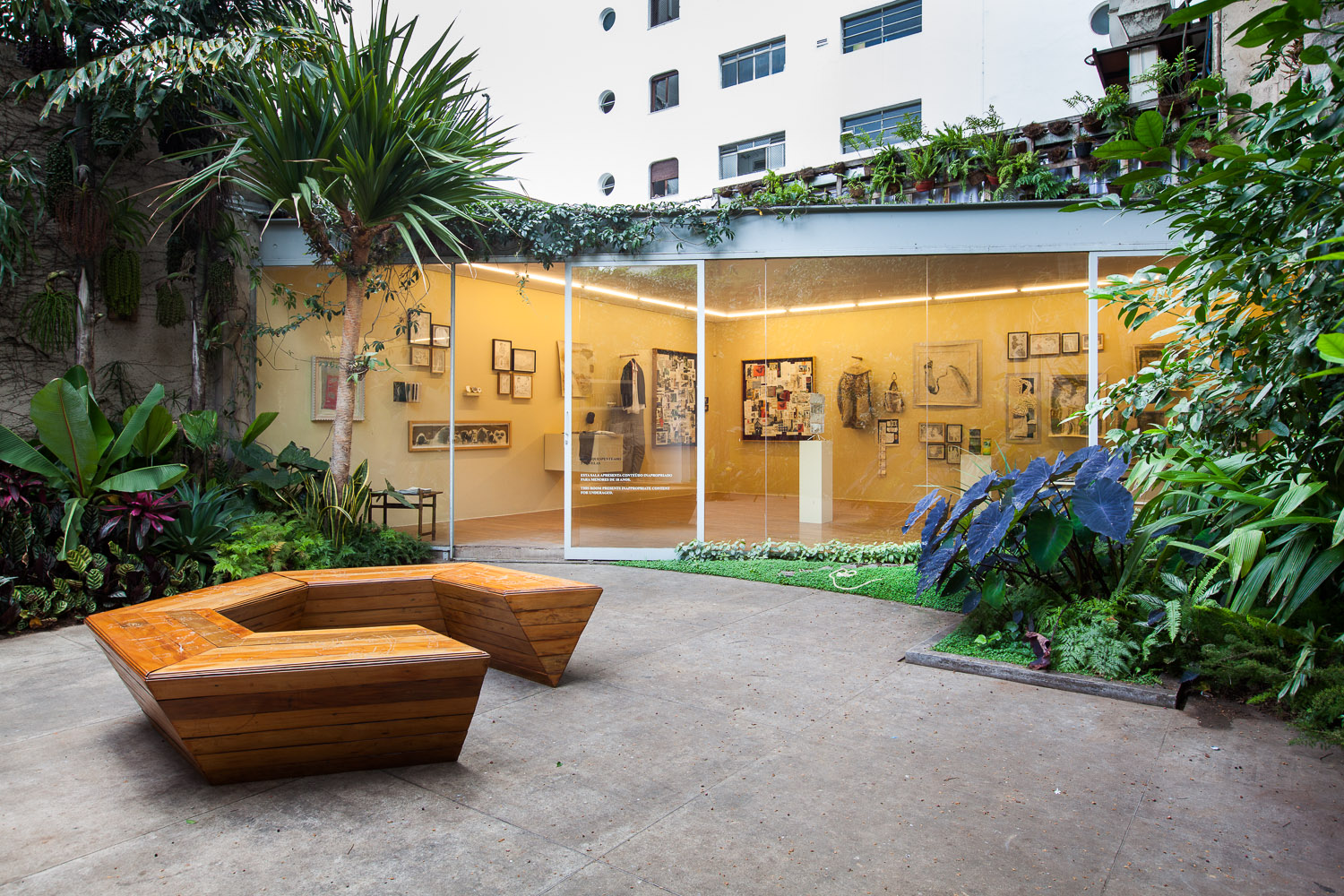
Mendes Wood DM, São Paulo in 2014

Mendes Wood DM is a contemporary art gallery founded in São Paulo in 2010. The gallery is known for exhibiting sculpture, paintings, video art, and installations and for representing Afro-Brazilian artists and 20th-century Brazilian works associated with self-taught artists, conceptual artists, and modernism. The gallery has locations in São Paulo, Brussels, Paris, and New York City.

== History ==
Mendes Wood DM was founded in São Paulo in 2010 by Pedro Mendes, Matthew Wood, and Felipe Dmab. Mendes and Wood, who met as philosophy of art students in Paris, initially began by representing the works of Brazilian sculptor Sônia Gomes in Paris. In 2010, Mendes and Wood partnered with Dmab to open the Mendes Wood DM gallery in São Paulo, gaining visibility as early supporters of Lucas Arruda, Paulo Nazareth, and Marina Perez Simão, for representing works by Tunga, and for being one of the few Brazilian galleries, at the time, representing Afro-Brazilian artists within Brazil and internationally.

In 2017, Mendes Wood DM opened a location in Brussels with founding partner Carolyn Drake Kandiyoti. That same year, the gallery collaborated with a German gallery, Galerie Michael Werner, to open Hic Svnt Dracones, a project space on East 66th Street in New York City. In 2018, Mendes Wood DM was incorporated as a mainstay in the Art Basel international art fair. A permanent New York City branch was opened on Walker Street in 2022. The inaugural show was dedicated to Brazilian artist Paulo Nazareth. Mendes Wood DM's collaborations with Nazareth, and other artists, have focused on post-colonial power relations and the socio-political facets of migration.

In 2023, the gallery opened a branch in the Marais district of Paris in a renovated 18th-century building on the Place des Vosges. The first Paris exhibition, curated by Fernanda Brenner and titled “I See No Difference Between a Handshake and a Poem” exhibited works by approximately 50 artists, including Lucas Arruda, Paulo Nazareth, Kishio Suga, Letícia Ramos, Luiz Roque, Patricia Leite, Pol Taburet, Nina Canell, Runo Lagomarsino, Tosh Basco, Michael Dean, Marguerite Duras, and Lygia Pape.

== Artistic Program ==
Mendes Wood DM exhibits 21st-century sculpture and conceptual works, works from several generations of Afro-Brazilian artists, and works from key figures in 20th-century Brazilian painting associated with self-taught artists and modernism. The gallery currently represents approximately 45 artists, including Alma Allen, Lucas Arruda, Patricia Ayres, Alvaro Barrington, Lynda Benglis, Heidi Bucher, Nina Canell, Guglielmo Castelli, Adriano Costa, Julien Creuzet, Michael Dean, Coco Fusco, Anna Bela Geiger, Sonia Gomes, Sanam Khatibi, Amadeo Luciano Lorenzato, Paulo Monteiro, Paulo Nazareth, Antonio Obá, Rosana Paulino, Kishio Suga, and Rubem Valentim. The gallery's program includes several artistic collaborations with other galleries, notably Blum & Poe (now Blum), David Zwirner Gallery, and Pace Gallery.
