= Emanoel Araújo =

Brazilian artist, writer, and museologist (1940–2022)

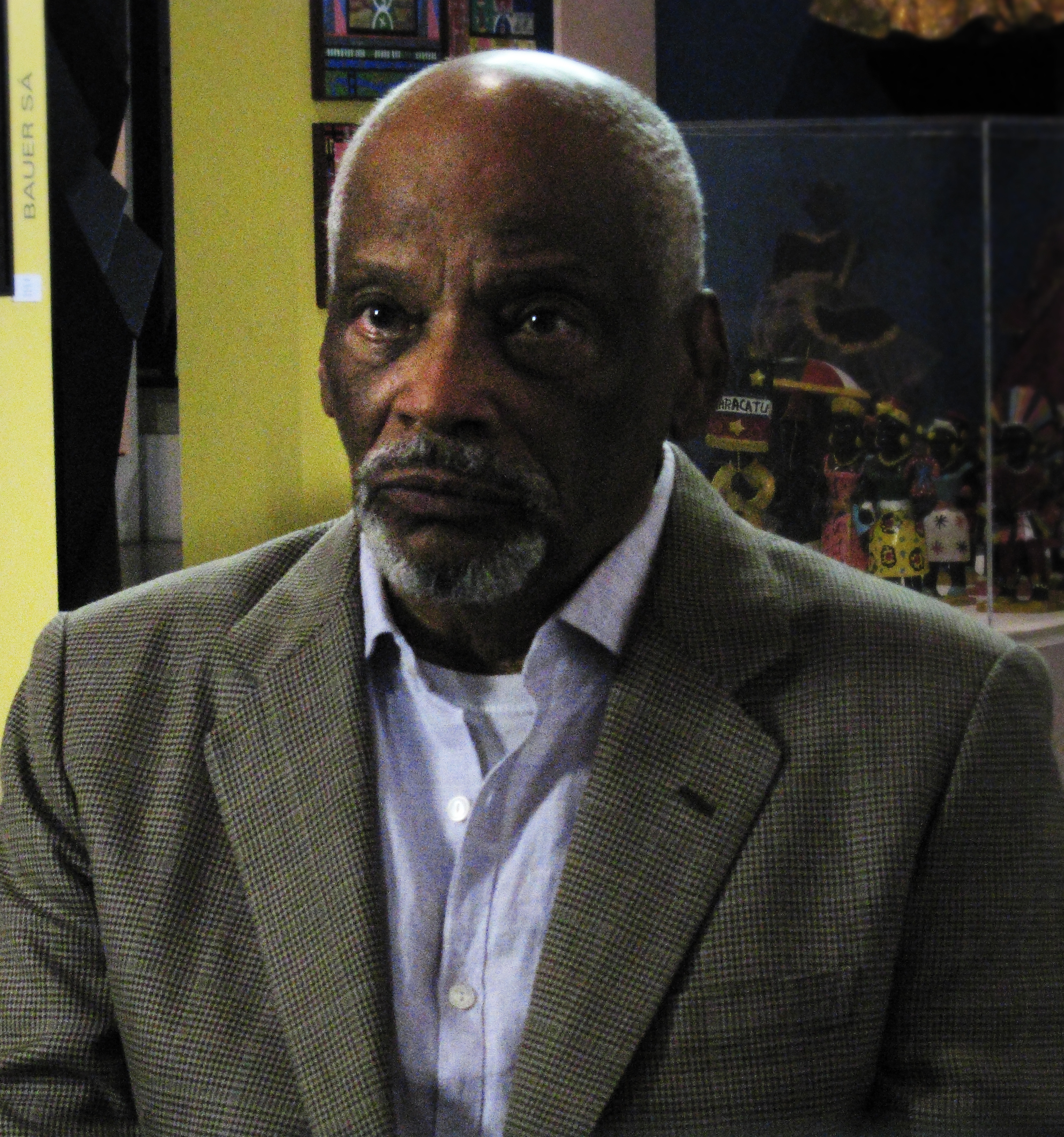
- Born: Emanoel Araújo; 15 November 1940; Santo Amaro, Bahia, Brazil
- Died: 7 September 2022 (aged 81); São Paulo, Brazil
- Education: Federal University of Bahia
- Occupations: Artist, art curator, museologist, museum director
- Years active: 1959–2022

Emanoel Araújo (15 November 1940, Santo Amaro, Bahia – 7 September 2022, São Paulo) was a Brazilian artist, art curator, and museologist. He specialized in numerous art styles, including, among others, sculpting, graphic design, and painting. He also served as the director of numerous museums in Brazil, including the Pinacoteca do Estado de São Paulo and Museu Afro Brasil, the latter of which he established in 2004. He has recounted his work as "a collection that became one of the largest museums in Latin America".

== Biography ==
Araújo was born into a family of goldsmiths in the city of Santo Amaro, in the state of Bahia. His first art exposition was in his home state of Bahia in 1959. Afterwards, he moved to Salvador to study at the School of Fine Arts at the Federal University of Bahia. In 1972, he won the gold medal at the third International Biennale for Graphic Design in Florence, Italy. From 1981 to 1983, he directed the Bahia Museum of Art and the São Paulo Museum of Art. In 1988, he lectured graphic design and sculpting at the Arts College of City College of New York. From 1992 to 2002, he was director of the Pinacoteca do Estado de São Paulo, during which time the museum went under major renovations, including the installation of modern security and climate control systems. He also oversaw the creation of the Friends of the Pinacoteca Association, which oversees the gathering of resources for the museum.

From 2004 to his death, he served as director of the Museu Afro Brasil, a museum dedicated to the culture and history of Afro-Brazilians. He often described the Museu Afro Brasil as his greatest accomplishment. In 2009, he was awarded the Order of Ipiranga by the state government of São Paulo, one of state's highest honors. The award was presented by then-governor José Serra.

Emanoel Araújo's artworks are included in museum collections worldwide, including the piece Oxumaré (2022) in the collection of the Pérez Art Museum Miami, Florida, which was featured in the show One Becomes Many next to Afro-Brazilian artists Rosana Paulino, Sonia Gomes, and Paulo Nazareth, among others.

Araújo died on 7 September 2022 at 81 years of age, at his home in São Paulo.
