= Pinault Collection =

French legal entity

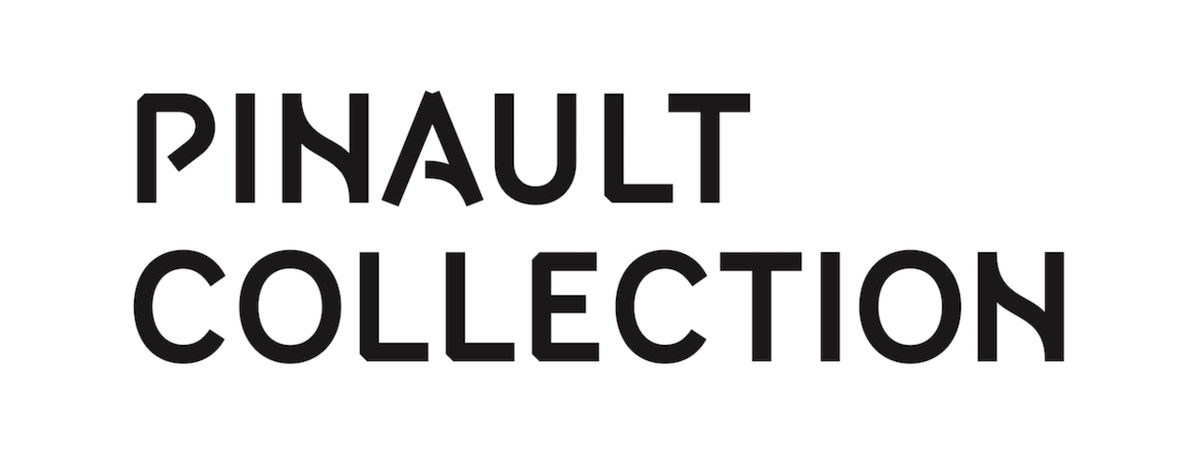
- Industry: Art
- Founded: 1999
- Founder: François Pinault
- Headquarters: Paris, France
- Services: Private art collection; Management of exhibition sites; Artwork loans; Cultural partnerships
- Parent: Groupe Artémis
- Website: Pinaultcollection.com

Pinault Collection is the legal entity holding the artistic and cultural assets of the French businessman François Pinault. It manages the art collection of the Pinault family, its exhibition sites, institutional and cultural partnerships, art loans, and artist-in-residence programs.

== Museums ==
=== Venice: Palazzo Grassi ===
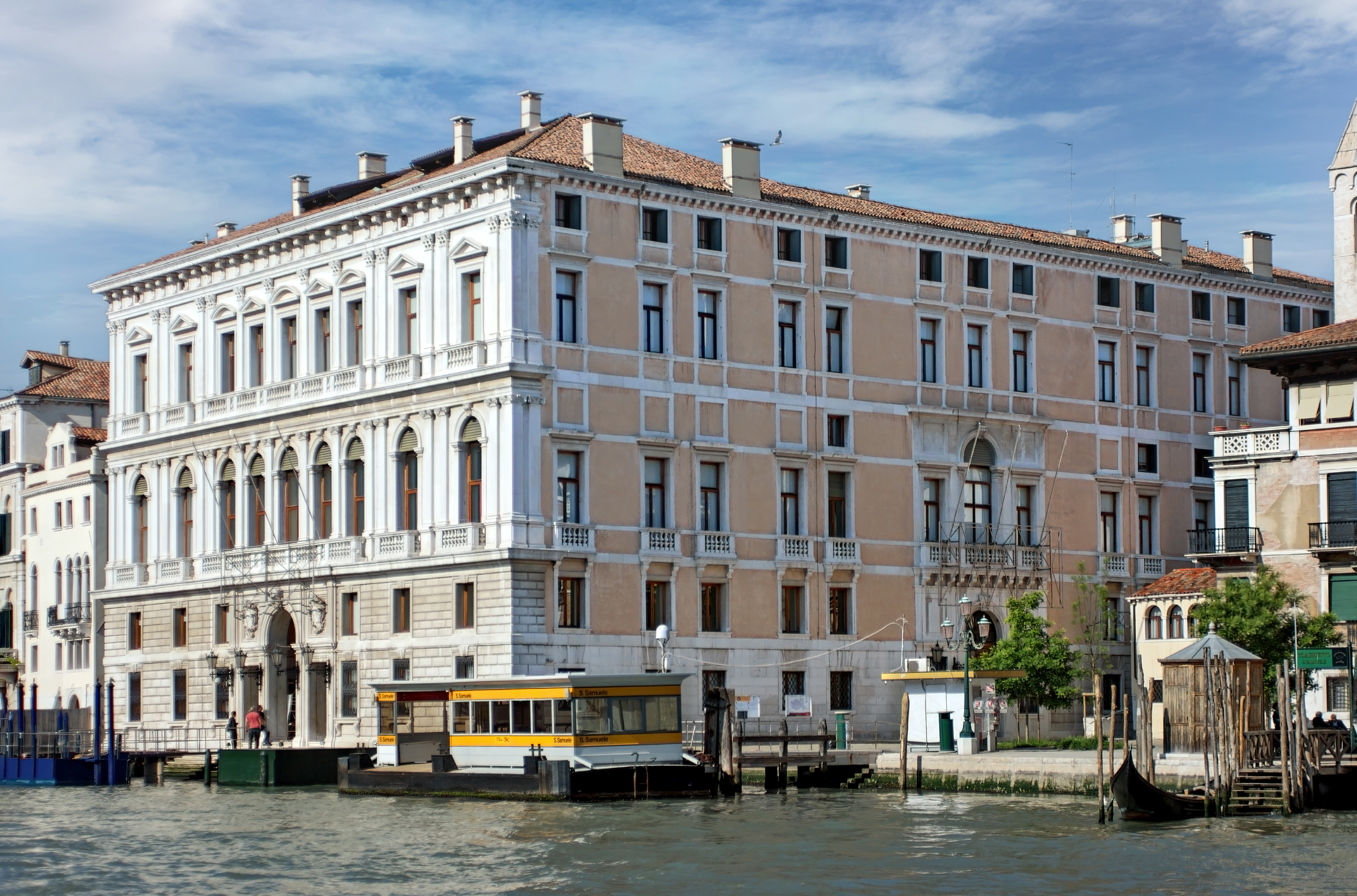
Palazzo Grassi.

In 2005, François Pinault bought the Palazzo Grassi from the Fiat Group. This Venetian complex is composed of two distinct buildings, a historical palazzo built along the Grand Canal during the 18th century, and an old theater in ruins, the Teatrino. In 2006, Japanese architect and Pritzker Prize laureate Tadao Ando was commissioned with the Palazzo's renovation. That same year, the new Palazzo Grassi was inaugurated with an exhibition of artwork from the Pinault Collection.

=== Venice: Punta della Dogana ===
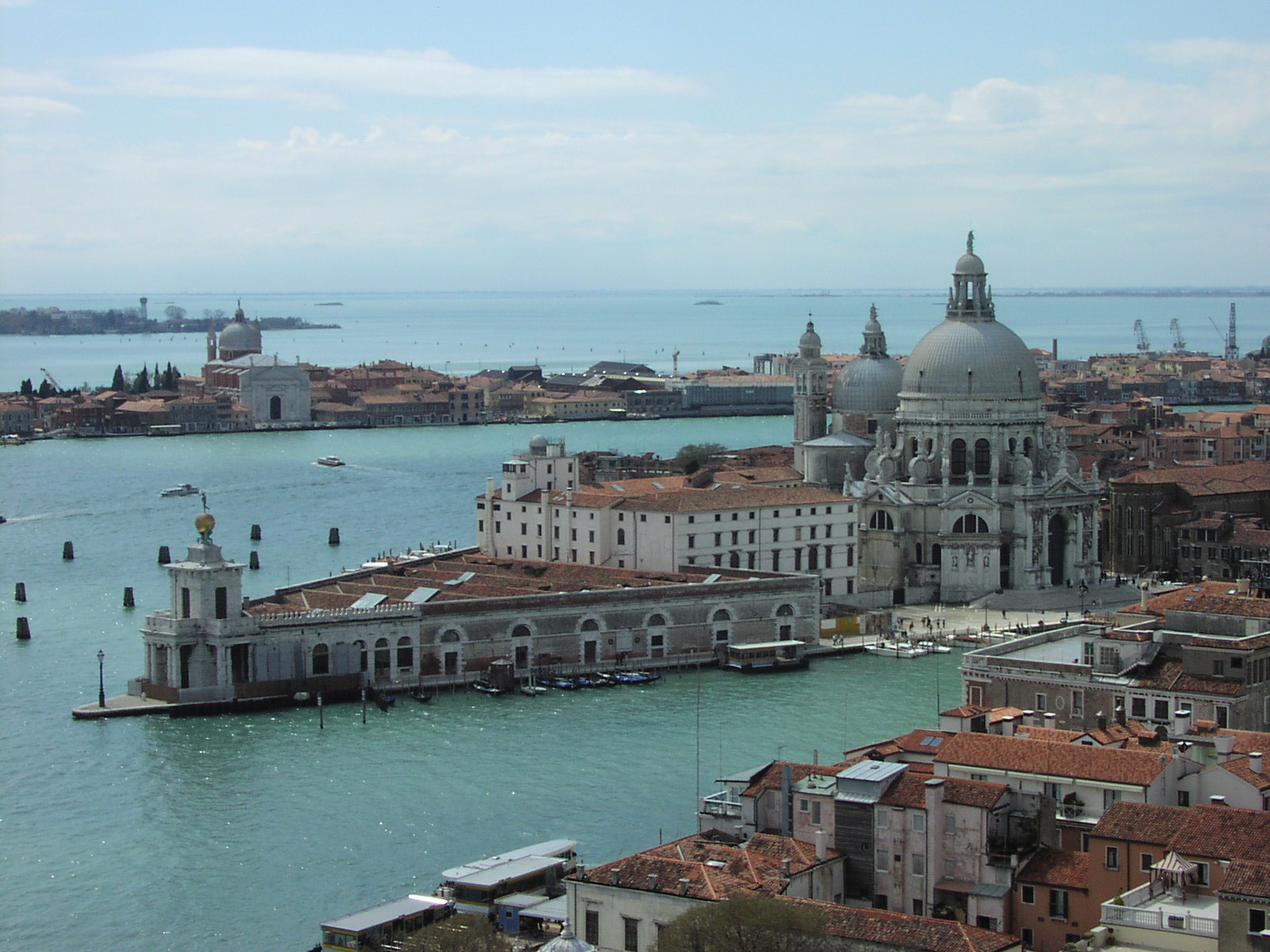
Punta della Dogana.

A year after the Palazzo Grassi opening, the Venice city council organized a competition to convert the 16th century custom house Punta della Dogana into a contemporary art museum. François Pinault won the competition over the Solomon R. Guggenheim Foundation. Pinault enlisted Tadao Ando once again for renovations, as the building had been abandoned for over 30 years.

The new museum boasts a 54,000 square feet exhibition area and was inaugurated in 2009.

=== Venice: Teatrino ===
Following the Palazzo Grassi (2006), and Punta della Dogana (2009) restorations, Pinault's cultural project for Venice continued with the rehabilitation of the Palazzo Grassi's Teatrino. Completed in 2013 and led by Tadao Ando, the project included a new auditorium of 200+ seats. The Teatrino had been closed to the public since 1983.

=== Paris: Bourse de Commerce ===
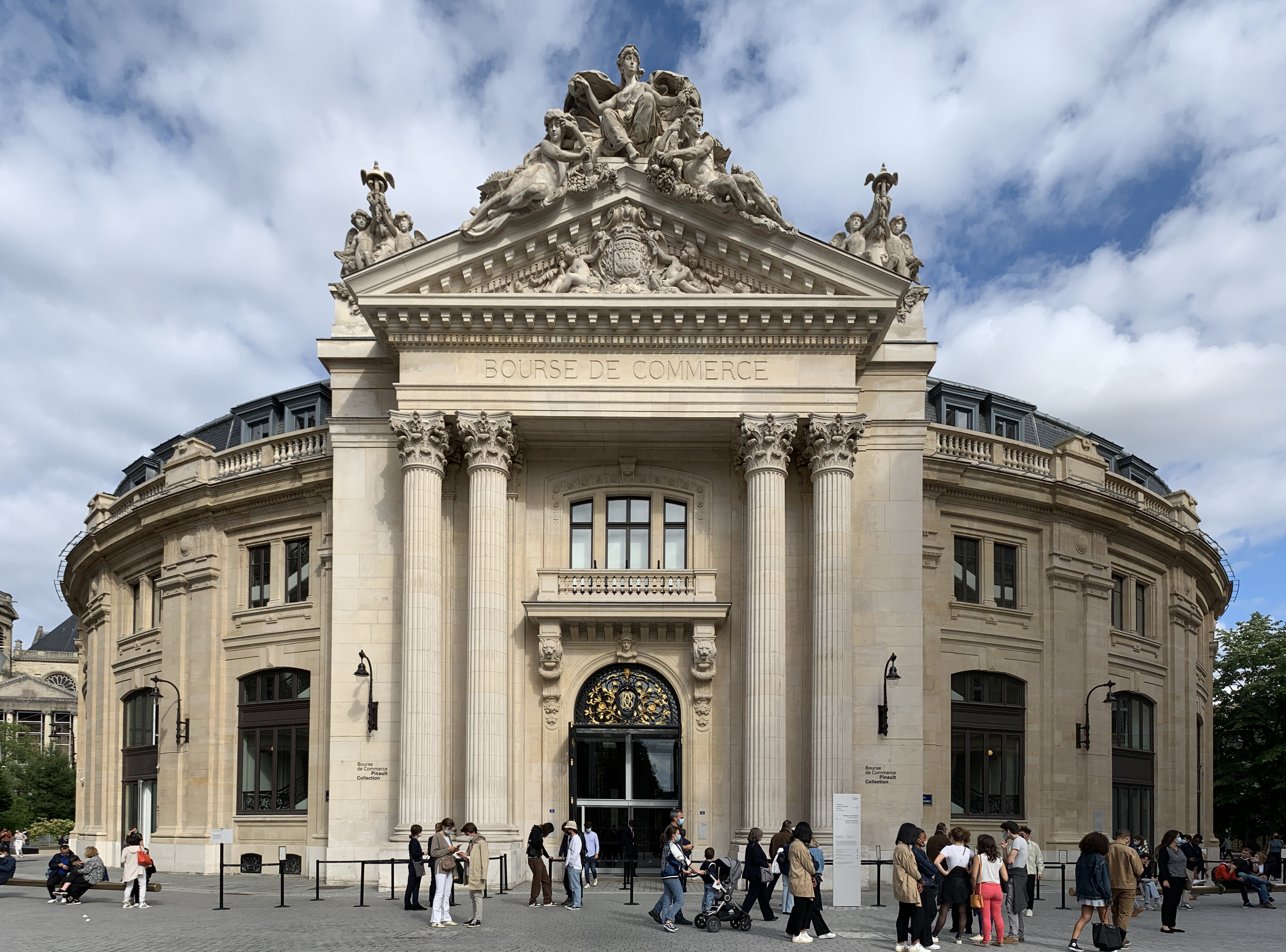
Bourse de commerce.

In April 2016, François Pinault and the Council of Paris announced plans to convert the city's landmark building Bourse de Commerce into a contemporary art museum. The renovation project reportedly cost over 100 million euros. The museum would host around 10 exhibitions per year. According to François Pinault, the new museum would work in coordination with its Venetian sister museums. Collaborations with other Parisian art institutions were also planned.

François Pinault entrusted Tadao Ando again for this renovation. He teamed up with Pierre-Antoine Gatier (architect-in-chief of the French National Heritage), as well as Lucy Niney and Thibault Marca of NeM agency, and Setec Bâtiment for the engineering of the project. The façades, the roof and the circular painting in the building's dome were rehabilitated. A 30-feet high and 100-feet in diameter concrete cylinder built beneath the central cupola serves as the main exhibition gallery, a "building within a building". The project covers a 32,000 square feet modular exhibition surface and a restaurant on the 3rd floor. The French designers Ronan & Erwan Bouroullec were entrusted with the museum's interior and exterior furnishings. The museum opened on 22 May 2021.

== Exhibitions ==
The Palazzo Grassi and the Punta della Dogana in Venice have been Pinault Collection's main exhibition sites since 2006. Pinault Collection pieces have been presented outside of the Pinault's museums thanks to a blue-chip artwork loan program available to both French and international art institutions, along with offsite exhibitions in different cities.

Date	Museum	City	Name	Notes
April 2006 - October 2006	Palazzo Grassi	Venice, Italy	Where are we going?	First official exhibition of the Pinault Collection.
November 2006 - March 2007	Palazzo Grassi	Venice, Italy	Picasso, la joie de vivre, 1945-48	Partnership with the Musée Picasso in Antibes.
2007		Lille, France	Passage of Time	
June 2009 - April 2011	Palazzo Grassi; Punta della Dogana	Venice, Italy	Mapping the Studio: Artists from the François Pinault Collection	
2009	Garage Museum	Moscow, Russia	A state of the world?	
2011		Seoul, South Korea	Agony and Ecstasy	
May 2013 - February 2015	Punta della Dogana	Venice, Italy	Prima Materia	Curated by Caroline Bourgeois and Michael Govan.
2014	Grimaldi Forum	Monaco	ArtLovers: Stories of Art in the Pinault Collection	
2016	Museum Folkwang	Essen, Germany	Dancing with Myself	by Urs Fischer.
2017	Fotografiska	Stockholm, Sweden	Resonance	
April 2017 - December 2017	Palazzo Grassi; Punta della Dogana	Venice, Italy	Treasures from the Wreck of the Unbelievable	by Damien Hirst.
2018	Couvent des Jacobins - Musée des Beaux-Arts	Rennes, France	Debout	
April 2018 - January 2019	Palazzo Grassi	Venice, Italy	Cows by the water	by Albert Oehlen.
March 2019 - December 2019	Punta della Dogana	Venice, Italy	Luogo e Segni	Curated by Mouna Mekouar and Martin Bethenod.
2019	Musée des Beaux-Arts de Rouen	Rouen, France	So British!	
March 2019 - January 2020	Palazzo Grassi	Venice, Italy	La Pelle	by Luc Tuymans.
May 2021 - January 2022	Palazzo Grassi; Punta della Dogana	Venice, Italy	Bruce Nauman: contrapposto studies	by Bruce Nauman.

== Other activities ==
=== Artist-in-residence program ===
The Pinault Collection artist-in-residence program was set up in 2015 in Lens, a former mining city in the North of France where the Louvre opened a local branch known as the Louvre-Lens. An old rectory was converted into the main residency building. The following artists went through the program:

- 2015-2016: Melissa Dubbin and Aaron S. Davidson
- 2016-2017: Edith Dekyndt
- 2017-2018: Lucas Arruda
- 2018-2019, Hicham Berrada
- 2019-2020: Bertille Bak
- 2020-2021: Enrique Ramirez
- 2021-2022: Melik Ohanian
- 2022-2023: Benoît Piéron

=== Pierre Daix Artbook Prize ===
François Pinault created the Pierre Daix Artbook Prize in 2015, honoring his late friend, the writer and Picasso's biographer Pierre Daix. The Pinault Collection awards yearly one outstanding book on modern and contemporary art history with 10 000 euros. Previous winners were:

- 2015: Yve-Alain Bois, Ellsworth Kelly: Catalogue Raisonné of Paintings, Reliefs, and Sculpture, Volume One, 1940–1953
  Marie-Anne Lescourret for Aby Warburg ou la tentation du regard.
- 2016: Maurice Fréchuret, Effacer. Paradoxe d'un geste artistique.
- 2017: Élisabeth Lebovici, Ce que le sida m'a fait - Art et activisme à la fin du XXe siècle.
- 2018: Pierre Wat, Pérégrinations. Paysages entre nature et histoire.
- 2019: Rémi Labrousse, Préhistoire, l'envers du temps.
- 2020: Pascal Rousseau, Hypnose. Art et hypnotisme de Messmer à nos jours.
- 2021: Germain Viatte, L'envers de la médaille.
- 2022: Jérémie Koering, Les Iconophages.

== Legal structure ==
Pinault Collection is a private company held by Pinault's Groupe Artémis. François Pinault is the president.

The Venetian sites (Palazzo Grassi, Punta della Dogana, Teatrino) are held and managed by Palazzo Grassi S.p.A. The city of Venice holds a non-controlling stake of Palazzo Grassi S.p.A. and is a member of the board.

As of 2019, the collection contained 5,000 pieces of 20th and 21st century artists, including works from Willem de Kooning, Piet Mondrian, Agnes Martin, Mark Rothko, Richard Serra, Damien Hirst, Takashi Murakami, Jeff Koons, Cy Twombly, and Cindy Sherman.

== Related pages ==
- François Pinault
- Groupe Artémis
