= Paulo Nimer Pjota =

Brazilian artist born in 1988

- Born: 1988 (age 37–38); São José do Rio Preto, Brazil
- Education: University of Sao Paulo, Brazil
- Known for: Painting, Public Art
- Movement: Contemporary Art

Paulo Nimer Pjota (born 1988, Sao Jose do Rio Preto, Sao Paulo) is a mixed media Brazilian artist. Pjota prefers to work on large surfaces. He uses canvas, sacks and scrap metal plates, mostly found in junkyards, as supports.

== Biography ==
Paulo Nimer Pjota was born in São José do Rio Preto, Brazil in 1988. He studied at the University Center of Fine Arts of São Paulo earning his Bachelor of Visual Arts. Pjota now lives and works in São Paulo,. He is an artist of many mediums and prefers to work on large surfaces.

== Education ==
Paulo Nimer Pjota received a bachelor's degree in Visual Arts from the Center of Fine Arts at the University of Sao Paulo (USP), in Sao Paulo, Brazil, in 2010. Pjota attend art history and critical art studies classes between 2012 and 2014 with art historian Rodrigo Naves, Francisco Alambert, and Polyana Canhete at the SESC Pompeia under the SESC educational ecossistem, in Sao Paulo.

== Work ==
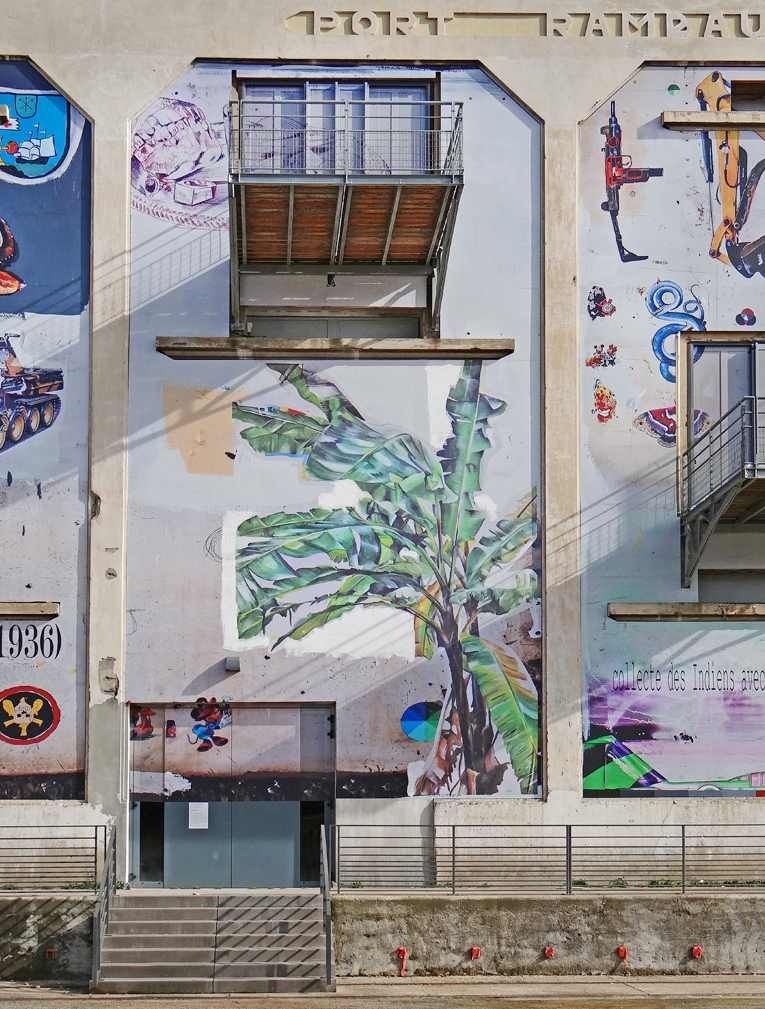
La Sucrière (Lyon Confluence) (10782943195)

Pjota's art consists of many colliding components that are neither literal or direct but rather suggestive and at times curious. "His works highlight the clichés of figurative and landscape painting".(Artuner) Each canvas is treated as a sketchbook of sorts in where you find a collection of images with no particular placement but each image intentionally.

Pjota suggests an open narrative in no particular order but the order in which the viewer's imagination takes. His work confronts the viewer with a string of juxtapositions. The archeological artifacts are compared with soda cans, still lifes overshadowed by war and popular culture meets what once was.

=== Collections ===
Paulo Nimer Pjota's work is featured in the collection of the Pérez Art Museum Miami, Florida.

=== Publications ===
The University of Chicago Press is releasing, in August 2026, the Paulo Nimer Pjota: A Lua e Eu, the publication features an interview with Swiss art critic and curator Hans Ulrich Obrist.

== Exhibitions ==
=== Solo shows (selection) ===
- 2026 Paulo Nimer Pjota: Encantados, South London Gallery, London
- 2016 Synthesis Of Contradictory Ideas and the Plurality of the Object as Image Part 2, Maureen Paley, London
- 2016 Synthesis of Contradictory Ideas and the Plurality of the Object as Image, Mendes Wood DM, São Paulo
- 2013 Relational System project Season – Palace of Arts São Paulo, São Paulo
- 2012 Paulo Nimer Pjota, Mendes Wood DM, São Paulo, Brazil
- 2009 Walking in the White, Anno Domini Gallery, San Jose, California

=== Group shows (selection) ===
- 2026 Held in Layers: Selections from PAMM's Collection, Pérez Art Museum Miami, Florida
- 2017 A Luz Que Vela O Corpo É A Mesma Que Revela a Tela, Caixa Cultural Rio de Janeiro, RJ, Brazil
- 2016 New Shamans / Novos Xamãs: Brazilian Artists, Rubell Family Collection, Miami, USA
- 2016 Soft Power. Arte Brasil., Kunsthal in Amersfoort, The Netherlands
- 2015 The World is Made of Stories, Astrup Fearnley Museet, Oslo, Norway
- 2015 City Uneasy, SESC Rio Preto, São José do Rio Preto, São Paulo, Brazil
- 2015 Imagine Brazil, DHC / Foundation for Contemporary Art, Montreal, Canada
- 2015 Ce Monde Fabuleux Moderne MAC-Lyon, Lyon, France
- 2015 Imagine Brazil, Tomie Ohtake Institute, São Paulo, Brazil
- 2015 19 Contemporary Art Festival SESC_Videobrasil – Southern Panoramas, SESC Pompeia, São Paulo, Brazil
- 2015 Nourishing, OCA, São Paulo, Brazil
- 2015 Nourishing Expo Milan, Milan, Italy Boiling Point, gallery PSM, Berlin, Germany
- 2015 Here There (Huna Hunak), QM Al Riwaq Gallery, Doha, Qatar
- 2014 Peace among animals, Rumors Fine Arts, São Paulo, Brazil
- 2014 The part que does not belong to you, Kunsthaus, Wiesbaden, Germany
- 2014 The First And Last Freedom, MOT international gallery, London, UK
- 2014 Made by ... done by Brazilians, matarazzo city, São Paulo, Brazil
- 2014 Imagine Brazil, Mac-Lyon, Lyon, France
- 2014 Nourishing, MAM-Rio, Rio de Janeiro, Brazil
- 2014 10 years of the prize acquisition, Centro Cultural São Paulo, São Paulo
- 2013 Chambers à Part, Edition VIII, La Réseve Paris, Paris, France
- 2013 Imagine Brazil, Astrup Fearnley Museet, Oslo, Norway
- 2013 Entre-temps ... Brusquement, et ensuite 12e Biennale de Lyon, Lyon, France
- 2012 Itinerancy SESC_Videobrasil, SESC, São José do Rio Preto, Campinas and Santos, Brazil
- 2012 Landscape of Invention, Yes Gallery, Curitiba, Brazil
- 2011 Southern Panoramas, the 17th International Contemporary Art Festival SESC_Videobrasil, SESC Belenzinho, São Paulo
- 2011 Without Limits, Yes Gallery, Curitiba, Brazil
- 2011 Untitled # 1-After-Death Experiences, Oscar Cruz Galeria, São Paulo
- 2010 Transfer of Cultures Museum Pavilion Brazilian, São Paulo, Brazil
- 2009 Paperview, John Jones Limited_Project Space, London, England
- 2008 Fresh Produce Anno Domini Gallery, San Jose, USA
- 2008 Pliable, Contemporary Art Museum of Parana, Curitiba, Brazil
- 2008 Illegitimate Paco das Artes, São Paulo, Brazil
- 20071o Hall Arts São José do Rio Preto, São José do Rio Preto, Brazil
- 2007 39th Salon of Arts Piracicaba, Piracicaba, Brazil
