= Guglielmo Castelli =

Italian artist

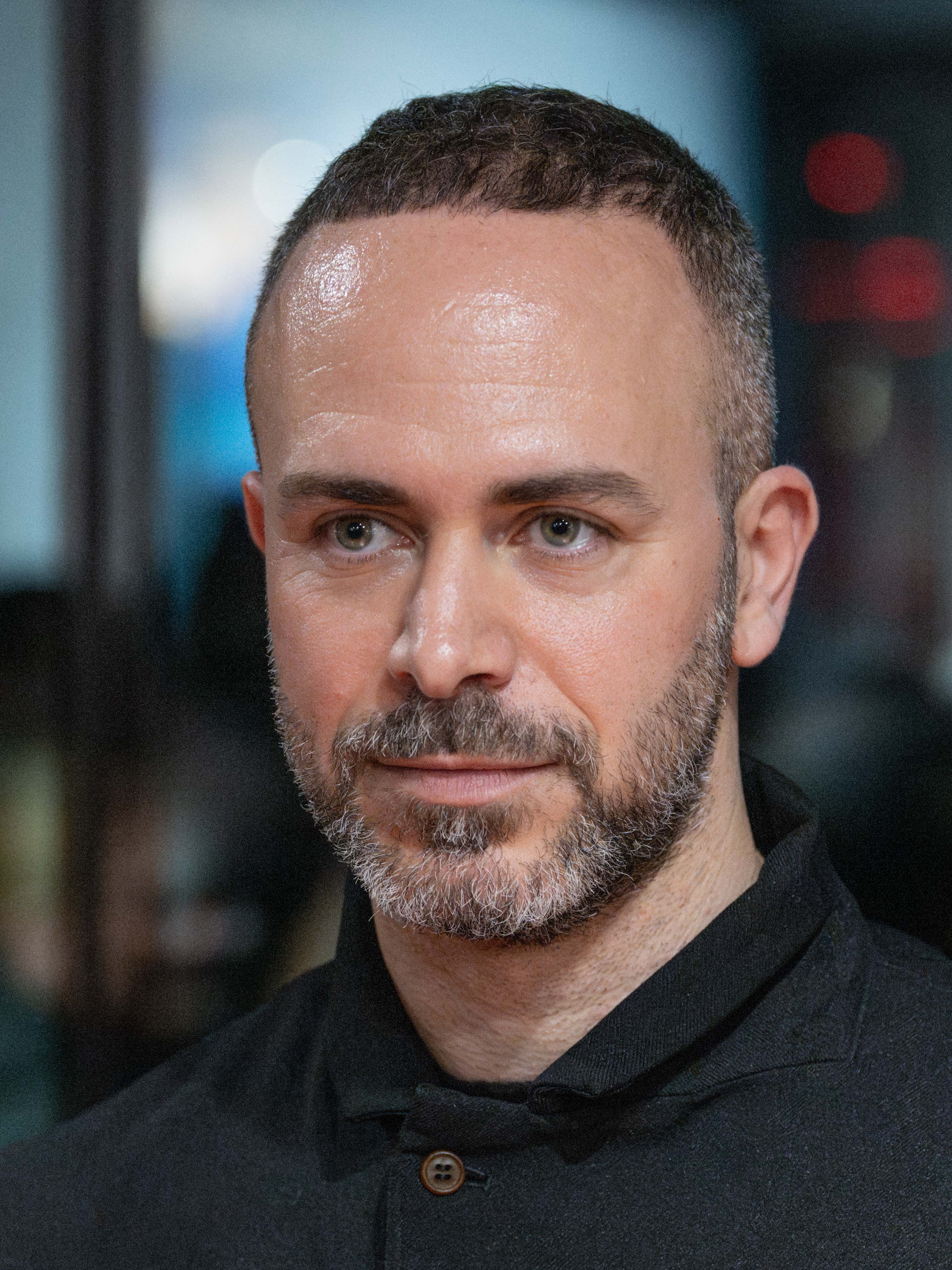
Guglielmo Castelli in 2026

Guglielmo Castelli (born 1987) is an Italian contemporary artist based in Turin, Italy. His works, particularly figurative oil paintings, have been included in group exhibitions at institutions such as the Louis Vuitton Foundation, Castello di Rivoli, Villa Medici, Künstlerhaus Bethanien, and Aspen Art Museum. The artists is known for works that often contain symbolism, theatrical elements, and inspiration from literature. Castelli began his career illustrating children's books at age 15 and later turned to fashion illustration for Vogue Italia. At age 28, Castelli was listed in Forbes Magazine's 2016 "30 under 30 Europe:The Arts" list.

== Exhibitions ==
In 2024, a Castelli exhibition hosted by the French Academy in Rome exhibited his paintings at the Villa Medici in Rome. Also in 2024, the artist's first major institutional show, “Improving Songs for Anxious Children,” organized by Istituzione Fondazione Bevilacqua La Masa, opened at the Palazzetto Tito in Venice, Italy, coinciding with the start of the 60th Venice Biennale. The exhibition was organized around a series of paintings, maquettes, and textile and knit works with references to scenography, fables, and literature.

== Public collections ==
Public collections featuring Castelli's work are located worldwide, including the Blenheim Art Foundation in Woodstock, UK; Castello di Rivoli Museo d’Arte Contemporanea in Rivoli, Italy; Fondazione Sandretto Re Rebaudengo in Turin, Italy; Marciano Art Foundation in Los Angeles, CA.
