= Rosana Paulino =

Brazilian artist, professor and curator

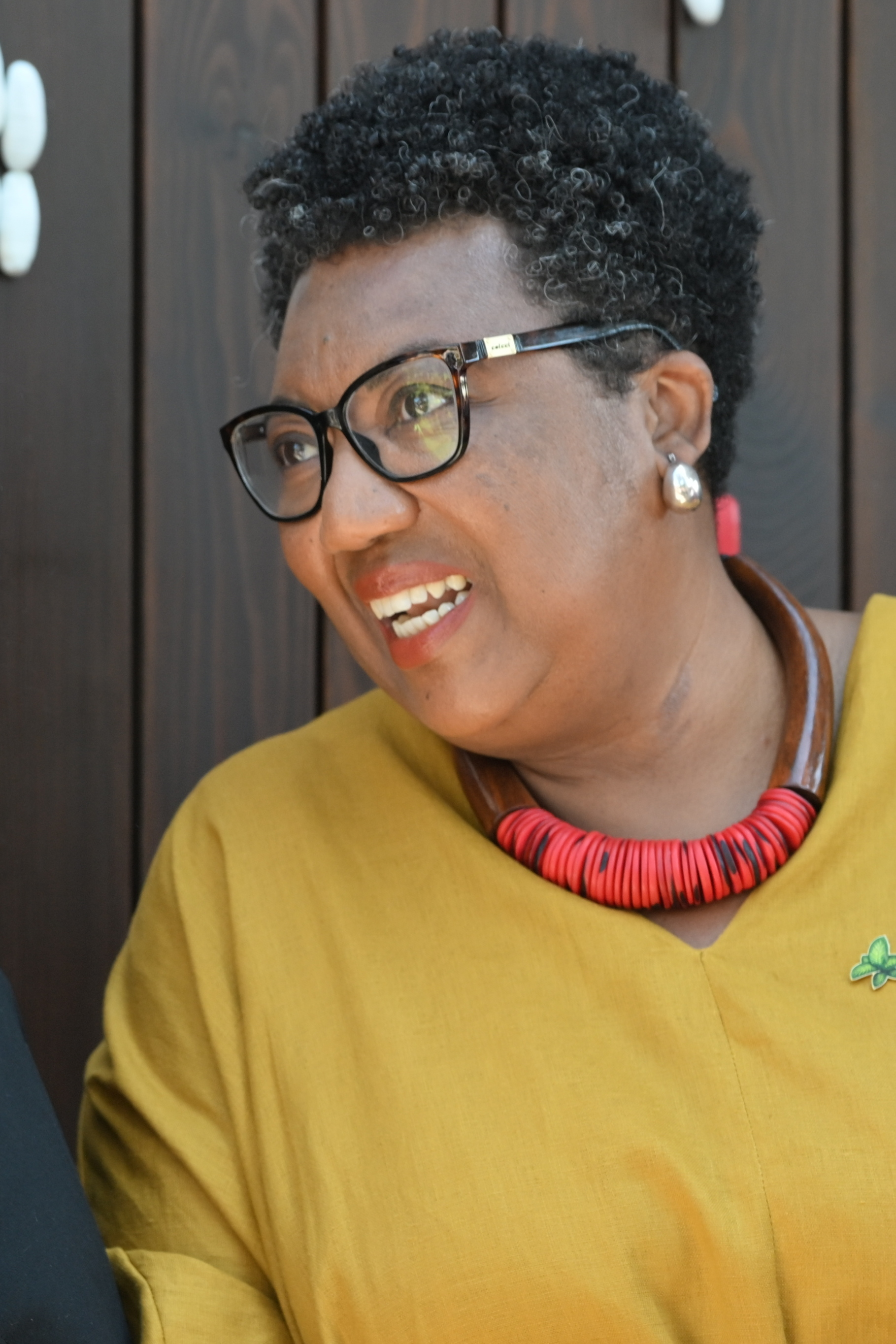
- at the Biennale di Venezia in 2026
- Born: 1967 (age 58–59); São Paulo, Brazil
- Website: www.rosanapaulino.com.br

Rosana Paulino (born 1967, in São Paulo) is a Brazilian contemporary artist, curator, and researcher. Paulino holds a doctorate in Visual Arts from the University of São Paulo, School of Communications and Arts and a specialization in printmaking from London Print Studio. Paulino engages with mediums including drawing, embroidery, engraving, printmaking, collage, and sculpture, often to engage with archetypes, memory, familial legacies, histories of racial violence and slavery in Brazil and to explore, what she describes as, Black female psychology. Her works have been displayed in multiple exhibtitions in the UK, France, Belgium, Italy, Spain, Portugal, Cape Verde, Puerto Rico, USA, Mexico, and Brazil. She has had solo exhibitions in Belgium, Germany, and Brazil and in public spaces such as The High Line in New York City. Paulino is one of two artists, alongside Adriana Varejão, selected to represent Brazil in the 61st Biennale di Venezia. Paulino's work is featured permanent collections including Centre Pompidou, MoMA, Pinacoteca do Estado de São Paulo, Harvard Art Museums, Tate, Studio Museum in Harlem, University of New Mexico Art Museum, and the Pérez Art Museum Miami.

== Background ==
Paulino is recognized for her visual representations of Black women that examine historical and modern social contexts of racism, discrimination, and slavery in Brazil. Across North and South America, the Black female body has been an “icon on display for public consumption”. It has been symbolic of sex and desire; eroticized, exoticized and objectified. All these perceptions, biases and stereotypes that seek to define the Black female body have been constructed by other’s definitions which are usually Western viewpoints. Paulino examines how Black women in Brazil are represented in history, media and society and builds a counter-narrative through her art works, re-claiming the voice and body of Black Brazilian women. As seen in her many exhibits, Paulino is a master of technical versatility using art mediums including drawing, sewing, lithography, digital printing, video, and sculpting. Paulino juxtaposes the way the Black female body is profited from and commoditized with depictions of the Black female body that are individualized and raw in an attempt to normalize it in mainstream media and art. Paulino sought to understand and bring meaning to “what it means to be a woman and what it means to be Black in Brazilian society”. Racial and gender inequalities in Brazil are deeply rooted in society. While there have been social and cultural movements to empower Black women and challenge these issues, inequalities are still interwoven in the social fabric of Brazil and its institutions. In her works, Paulino creates space where Black women do not assume stereotypical roles including wet nurse, nanny and maid. Moreover, she simultaneously subverts usual class hierarchies and the social fabric that represses Black women in Brazil. In an artist’s reflection video on Parede da Memória, Paulino says “I had to speak up. And I chose art to address these issues”.

Paulino, the daughter of a cleaner and a house painter, grew up in a middle-class family with two sisters. As a child she regularly drew and played with clay which was the genesis for her fascination with the arts. As she grew older, she realized the prejudices and marks of slavery left on Black women in Brazil and wanted to address those issues. Never having black dolls to play with as a child or realizing how Black women were only depicted on television in certain roles are examples of gender and racial inequality that affected Paulino. According to The Guardian, In 2011, Paulino became the first Afro-Brazilian woman to obtain a PhD in visual arts.

Art historian Igor Simões has called Paulino "the most important Black artist in Brazil in the last 30 years," noting her interpretations of Black Brazilian history are "crucial for understanding the broader Afro-Atlantic world." Hélio Menezes, director of the Museu Afro Brasil, credited her 1994 Parede da memória as "one of the first times Black faces were included in the white cube of contemporary art galleries" and called it "a very direct, critical act of decolonization."

== Art influences ==
As an artist in her early days, she realized the limitations of drawing and began to use other media types such as photography and engravings. She used personal family photograph archives as the inspiration for several of her exhibits. She thought that Black women fell into the background of society, not seen nor heard, and were unable to defend themselves. The inspiration for her early exhibit, Assentamento(s), was the historical archives of photographs of Black women in Brazil by a Swiss zoologist and Harvard professor, Louis Agassiz. Paulino saw the limitations of these photographs and how they de-humanized and objectified the women without acknowledging their lives or struggle. She re-created an artwork using the photograph of one woman and gave her agency, a name, a story, and a history. Her focus was on understanding the lasting marks of colonialism and slavery on Brazilian society, particularly towards Black women. Her interests, as can be seen in her many works, include autobiographies, biology, flora and fauna, and topics centered on history.

== Awards ==
Paulino was awarded the inaugural 2024 Munch Award for Artistic Freedom. She also received the Konex Award from Argentina in 2022.

== Notable exhibitions ==
=== Diálogos do Dia e da Noite ===
Diálogos do Dia e da Noite (Dialogues of the Day and of the Night) examined contrasts between diurnal and nocturnal imagery. The exhibition features works from Paulino's ongoing Senhora das Plantas (Lady of Plants) series, depicting goddess figures merging with Brazilian flora, with limbs transforming into tree roots, hair flourishing as leaves, and fingers blooming into flowers. Many works incorporate plants carrying spiritual or protective significance in Afro-Brazilian religion and popular culture. The exhibition ran concurrently with Paulino's first large-scale public mural, "The Creation of the Creatures of Day and Night" (2024), displayed on New York's High Line.

=== Assentamento(s) ===
Assentamento(s) is an art project by Rosana Paulino where she examines how the Black female body is interwoven in the history of Brazil. Paulino disassembles and re-assembles the historical photographs of Black women by Swiss zoologist and Harvard professor, Louis Agassiz, in an effort to refazimento or ‘remake’ their narrative in Brazilian society. Paulino transposes these images onto a fabric and uses a multi-media approach where she cuts and re-assembles pieces with stitching. The photographs by Agassiz objectify and de-humanize the Black women, denying them names, a story, or a history. Paulino gives agency and identity to the women, enlarging Agassiz’s photographs to true size and stitching biological organs in color to their bodies. She acknowledges the struggles and scars of colonialism and racism through the rough stitching of misaligned sections of the fabric. Paulino encourages the viewer to contemplate the history of Black women in Brazil and how they “continue to be treated as second-class citizens, subject to cycles of oppression”.

=== The Sewing of Memory ===
The Sewing of Memory at the Pinacoteca of São Paulo is a celebratory exhibition that showcases over 140 works by Paulino from 1993-2018. The works together contemplate issues of gender, racism, colonialism, and class hierarchies in the context of the history of Brazil. The exhibit consists of three exhibition rooms featuring works such as Parede da Memória (Wall of Memory, 1994-2015) and Bastidores (Embroidery Hoops/Backdrop, 1997). One room contains photographs from Paulino’s family archive, printed and multiplied onto ‘patuas’ (a religious African protection amulet). The photographs each have delicate colorful stitching. The gaze of the people in the images are powerful and hold the gaze of the viewer. Another work involves the embroidery of women onto circular pieces of clothes. The women each have a piece of their face roughly stitched over including the mouth, throat, eyes, or head. This stitching is symbolic of the silence, violence, slavery, and sexualization forced onto Black women by the patriarchy, racism and colonialism embedded in Brazilian culture and social structures. The stitched mouths of the women (Paulino's sister and godmother) in the exhibition recall the image of Escrava Anastacia and the iron bit (Máscara de Flandres) once used on plantations to punish, silence, constrain, and spread fear among slaves.

=== BÚFALA ===
Bufala is an exhibit that features a group of drawings depicting ‘she’ buffalos or ‘animal-women’. The drawings have a strong connection to African myths as the ‘animal-women’ are a reference to Orisha Oya or Iansã, the mother of dusk who controls the storms and wind. Paulino examines these myths from the perspective of Black women and uses them to re-define what it means to be a Black woman. In the drawings, the women have animalistic stances, blood-drawn eyes, markings, and their tongues stuck out. These distinctions can also be a reference to the Hindu goddess Kali who is the deity of destruction and rebirth. Paulino uses reference to these myths and the deities to starkly contrast how black women are depicted from a Western versus non-white perspective. The Western depiction of women is usually associated with Catholic perspectives where women are virgins, submissive, delicate, and not the protagonists of artworks. In Bufala, Paulino gives depth and identity to women that do not fit within the confines of Western perspective. Bufala is symbolic of freedom and liberty.

=== Senhora das Plantas ===
Senhora das Plantas is a parallel exhibit to Bufala that features of group of drawings depicting ‘vegetable-women’ that have roots growing from their bodies. The women are symbolic of life, re-birth, and mother nature with an emphasis on roots stemming from their feminine body parts including breasts and vaginas. While Bufala depicts women as the fighters and hunters, Senhora das Plantas provides a lovely juxtaposition where women are the creators of life. In essence, Paulino shows us that woman cannot be defined by only one, but she is the symbiosis of both archetypes: the hunter and the gatherer, the masculine and feminine. The use of myth in Senhora das Plantas allows Paulino to bring to light past narratives on the history of Black women.

=== Wet Nurse Series ===
Paulino’s Wet Nurse series examines the specific example of the task of wet nursing required of some enslaved women. Enslaved wet nurses were required to breastfeed their masters’ children and in many cases were not allowed to breastfeed their own children. This resulted in the biological children of enslaved women going hungry. In the series, Paulino depicts these women and their emotions by stitching a messy entanglement of veins from the women’s breasts. The breasts of the women are lactating a red liquid which may be interpreted as milk or blood. Paulino uses this specific example to shine light on both the acute and broad effects of slavery on Black Brazilian women.

== List of exhibitions ==
- 2024/2026 – One Becomes Many, Pérez Art Museum Miami, Florida
- 2024 – Diálogos do Dia e da Noite, Mendes Wood DM, New York
- 2024 – Amefricana, Museo de Arte Latinoamericano de Buenos Aires (MALBA), Buenos Aires, Argentina
- 2023/2024 – Nascituras, Mendes Wood DM, Sao Paulo, Brazil
- 2022/2023 - Rosana Paulino: The Liability of Threads, Kunstverein Braunschweig, Braunschweig, Germany
- 2022 - The Time of Things, Mendes Wood DM, Brussels, Belgium
- 2019 - BÚFALA, Mendes Wood DM, São Paulo, Brazil
- 2018/2019 - Rosana Paulinho: a costura da memória (Rosana Paulino: The Sewing of Memory), Pinacoteca do Estado de São Paulo, São Paulo
- 2017 - Atlântico Vermelho (Red Atlantic), Padrão dos Descobrimentos, Lisbon, Portugal
- 2016 - Atlântico Vermelho (Red Atlantic), Galeria Superfície, São Paulo
- 2015/2016 - Territórios: Artistas Afrodescendentes no Acervo da Pinacoteca (Territories: Artists of African Descent in the Collection of the Pinacoteca), Pinacoteca do Estado de São Paulo, São Paulo
- 2014 - Mulheres Negras – Obscure Beuaté Du Brésil, Espace Cultural Fort Griffon, Besançon, France
- 2013 - Assentamento, Museu de Arte Contemporânea de Americana, São Paulo
- 2010 - Tecido Social - Galeria Virgílio, São Paulo
- 2007 - Mulheres Artistas / Olhares Contemporâneos, Museu de Arte Contemporânea, (MAC/USP), São Paulo
- 2000 - Brasil +500 Mostra do Redescobrimento - Arte Afro-Brasileira, Fundação Bienal de São Paulo, São Paulo
- 1995 - Os Herdeiros da Noite: fragmentos do imaginário negro, Centro Cultural de Belo Horizonte, Minas Gerais
- 1995 - Os Herdeiros da Noite: fragmentos do imaginário negro, Pinacoteca do Estado de São Paulo, São Paulo
- 1994 - Os Herdeiros da Noite: fragmentos do imaginário negro, Espaço Cultural SOS Sul, Brazil
