= Paulo Nazareth =

Brazilian visual artist (born 1977)

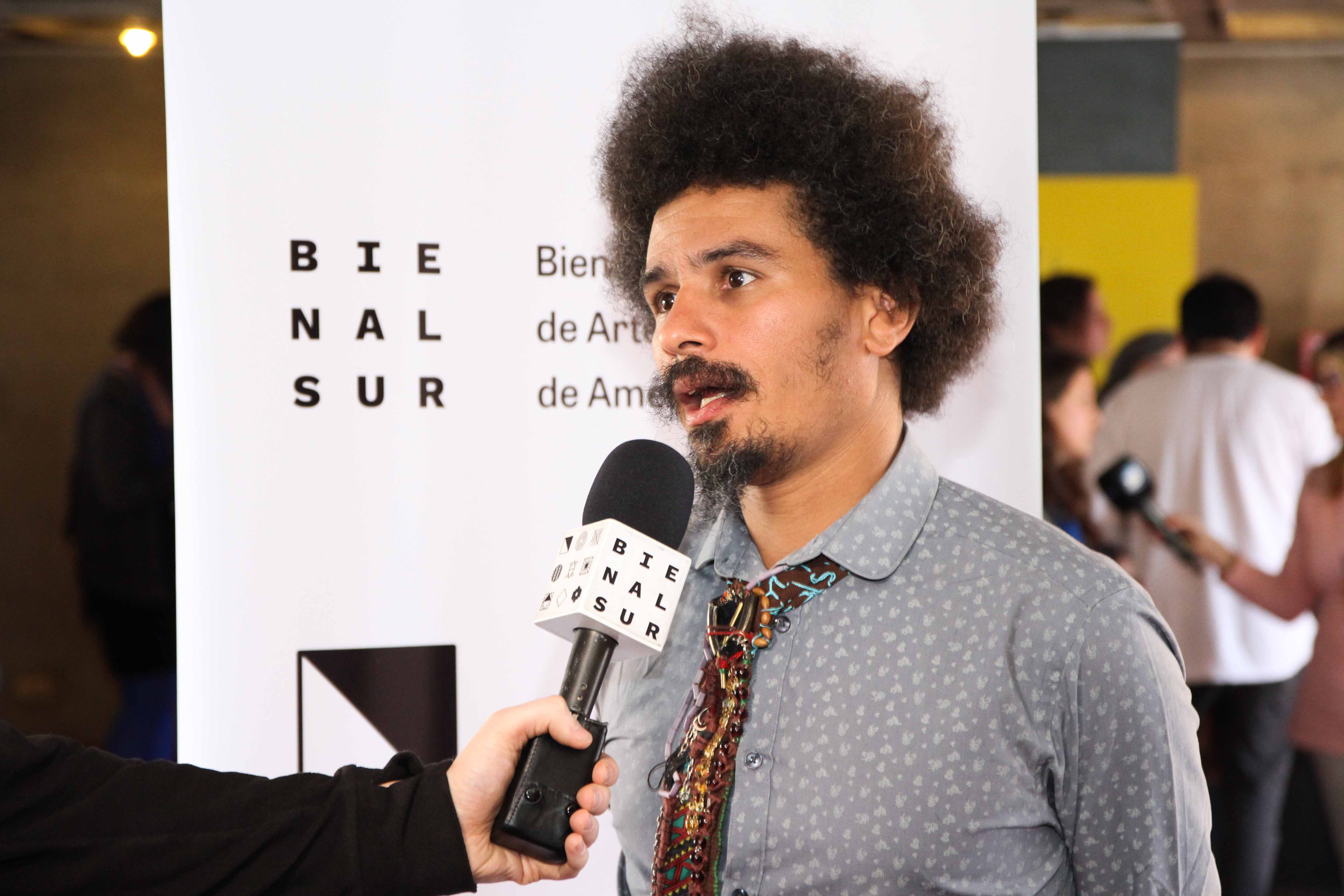
- Born: 1977 (age 48–49); Governador Valadares, Minas Gerais, Brazil
- Education: BFA, Universidade Federal de Minas Gerais; MFA Universidade Federal de Minas Gerais
- Known for: Performance, Photography, Installation
- Notable work: "Banana Market" (2011)

Paulo Nazareth (born 1977) is a Brazilian contemporary artist based in Belo Horizonte, Brazil. Nazareth has achieved acclaim for his distinctive approach to contemporary art. His work, which includes multimedia and performance-based pieces, has been exhibited internationally in venues such as the Venice Biennale, the Museum of Modern Art, New York, and the National Gallery of Art, Washington DC.

== Biography ==
Paulo Nazareth, born in 1977 in Governador Valadares, Minas Gerais, Brazil, is of Afro-Brazilian descent. Nazareth builds relationships with the diverse individuals he meets while traveling for his art—often long distances by foot—and these people often become the inspiration for his works of art.

In March 2011, he walked from Minas Gerais, Brazil to New York. This solo journey took him five months as he traveled thousands of miles north by foot. He never washed his bare feet, refraining only until he was able to ritualistically wash them in eastern New York's Hudson River. The trip served as a form of performance, allowing him to gauge people's reactions as he passed through their towns and cities. He focused on their perceptions of his racial identity and appearance.

Nazareth's work is included in the permanent collections of museums in his home country of Brazil and abroad in institutions such as the Museum of Modern Art, Rio de Janeiro and the Pérez Art Museum Miami, Florida.

== Education ==
In 1990, Paulo Nazareth studied under Mestre Orlando, a folk artist from Bahia who had moved to Belo Horizonte, where he taught Nazareth the art of carving carrancas.

Paulo Nazareth earned his BFA in 2005, and his MFA in 2006, both from the Universidade Federal de Minas Gerais in Brazil. In 2010, he returned to the university to study Linguistics.

== Artworks ==
Paulo Nazareth's ethnic heritage and cultural background are major aspects in his works. Through his art, he intends to bring awareness to global issues such as globalization, immigration, ethnicization, and the effects of capitalism in his home country of Brazil, and Latin America as a whole. He primarily works in performance art, painting, and installation.

One of the artist's most notable performance pieces is perhaps his 2011 work titled Banana Market, also known as Art Market, in which he initially attempted to carry a sack of bananas with him on foot from Latin America to an exhibition Art Basel in Miami, but the work was thwarted when there would be complications with bringing fruit across international borders. Paulo then decided to display one ton of bananas (along with photos, drawings, and placards) in a Volkswagen bus at the exhibition in lieu of the performance.

Nazareth's works often address decoloniality and the reemergence of subjugated forms of knowledge and memory. One recent example of such work is the "Tree of Forgetting," in which Nazareth walks backward and counter-clockwise around a tree in Benin in a reversal of the ritual in which captives of the Atlantic slave trade were forced to circle endlessly around particular trees in the hopes that they would forget their origins, culture, and history.

== Awards and grants ==
As a part of his PIPA Prize awards in 2016, of which he won the two main categories (PIPA and Popular Vote Exhibition) Paulo Nazareth made another journey on foot from Belo Horizonte to New York to receive his award, then stayed in the state for the next three months for a residency at Residency Unlimited as part of his PIPA Prize award.

- 2016: PIPA Prize, PIPA Institute, Museum of Modern Art of Rio de Janeiro, Rio de Janeiro, Brazil
- 2012: MASP de Artes Visuais – Mercedes-Benz Award, São Paulo, Brazil
- 2010: 12º Salão Nacional de Arte de Itajaí, Santa Catarina, Brazil
- 2005: Bolsa Pampulha, Belo Horizonte, Brazil

== Exhibitions ==
His recent exhibitions include Algebra, Pinault Collection – Punta della Dogana (2026); Honey, John Jay College of Criminal Justice, New York (2025); Patuá/Patois, WIELS, Brussels (2025); LUZIA, Museo Tamayo, Mexico City (2024); Esconjuro, Inhotim, Brumadinho (2024); En la casa de mi hermano, Proyectos Ultravioleta, Guatemala City (2023); BIRDMAN, Stevenson, Amsterdam (2022); Stroke, The Power Plant, Toronto (2022); Vuadora, Pivô, São Paulo (2022); Melee, ICA Miami, Miami (2019); Faca Cega, Museu de Arte da Pampulha, Belo Horizonte (2018); The Journal, Institute for Contemporary Arts, London (2014); Premium Bananas, MASP, São Paulo (2012).

Select Solo Exhibitions
Exhibition	Organization	Location	Date
Algebra	Pinault Collection	Venice	2026
Patuá/Patois	WIELS	Brussels	2025
Luzia	Museo Tamayo	Mexico City	2024
Esconderujo	Inhotim	Brumadinho	2024
INTLANZI	Stevenson	Cape Town	2024
BIRDMAN	Stevenson	Amsterdam	2022
STROKE	The Power Plant	Toronto	2022
Vuadora	Pivô	São Paulo, Brazil	2022
Nosotros los otros	Mendes Wood DM	New York, New York	2022
Melee	ICA Miami	Miami, Florida	2019
A LA FLEUR DE LA PEAU	Mendes Wood DM	Brussels, Belgium	2019
PHAMBI KWENDLOVU	Stevenson Gallery	Cape Town, South Africa	2019
Faca Cega	Museu de Arte da Pampulha	Belo Horizonte, Brazil	2018
INNOMINATE	Mendes Wood DM	New York, New York	2017
Old Hope	Mendes Wood DM	São Paulo, Brazil	2017
Genocide in Americas	Meyer Riegger	Berlin, Germany	2015
The Journal	Institute for Contemporary Arts	London, United Kingdom	2014
Banderas Rotas	Galleria Franco Noero	Turin, Italy	2014
Veneza Neves	Veneza, Riberão das Neves	Minas Gerais, Brazil	2013
Premium Bananas	Museu de Arte de São Paulo	São Paulo, Brazil	2012
News from Americas	Mendes Wood DM	São Paulo, Brazil	2012
Na impossibilidade de nomear	Museu de Uberlândia	Uberlândia, Brazil	2010
Paulo Nazareth	LTDA	Porto Alegre, Brazil	2008
Untitled	Museu de Arte de Pampulha	Belo Horizonte, Brazil	2007
Gambiarreiro	SESI-MINAS	Minas Gerais, Brazil	2004

Select Group Exhibitions
Exhibition	Organization	Location	Date
One Becomes Many	Pérez Art Museum Miami	Florida	2024
Chosen Memories	The Museum of Modern Art	New York	2023
Língua Solta	Museu da lingua Portuguesa	São Paulo, Brazil	2021
Global(e) Resistance	Centre Pompidou	Paris, France	2020
Our Selfie	MO Museum	Vilnius, Lithuania	2019
EXTREME. NOMADS	MMK Museum für Moderne Kunst	Frankfurt am Main,	2018
Field Gate	Remai Modern	Saskatoon, Canada	2017
Much wider than a line	SITE Santa Fe	Santa Fe, USA	2016
Here There (Huna Hunak)	QM Gallery Al Riwaq	Doha, Qatar	2015
Imagine Brazil	Musée d’art contemporain de Lyon	Lyon, France	2014
The Encyclopedic Palace	55 Biennale di Venezia	Venice, Italy	2013
Il va se passer quelque chose	Maison de l’Amérique Latine	Paris, France	2012
MYTHOLOGIES	Cité Internationale des Arts	Paris, France	2011
Por aqui forma tornam-se atitudes	SESC Vila Mariana	São Paulo, Brazil	2010
Pesta Seni Performa	CCCL	Surabaya, Indonesia	2009
Sobremesa de Queijos	Museu Mineiro	Minas Gerais, Brazil	2008
Multiparidade	Palácio das Artes	Belo Horizonte, Brazil	2007
Untitled	International Video-Performance Art Festival	Tallinn, Estonia	2005
