= Enrique Ramírez =

Chilean artist (born 1979)

Enrique Ramírez is a Chilean artist born in 1979 in Santiago de Chile.

Photographer, filmmaker, sculptor, and musician, he is known for films and installations that explore the sea as a recurring setting and motif. His work often examines themes of memory, narrative, and movement, and has been described as connecting Chile’s history to travel, conquest, and migration.

== Biography ==
Enrique Ramírez studied music and cinema in Chile before going at the Studio National des Arts Contemporains-Le Fresnoy (Tourcoing, France) in 2007.

His father is a sailboat manufacturer in Chile. He appears in several of his films and some of his sculptures are made with sails of boats made by his father.

Enrique Ramírez is interested in poetry and electronic music.

== Works ==
Enrique Ramírez' work is focus on the sea, both as a historical and fictional setting.

== Exhibitions and awards ==
In 2013, he won the prix découverte des Amis du Palais de Tokyo, Paris, France

In 2014, he won the Loop fair prize, Barcelona, Spain. In 2019 he is shortlisted in the Marcel Duchamp Prize in France

He has exhibited at the Palais de Tokyo in Paris (France), the Centre Pompidou in Paris (France), the Museo Amparo in Puebla (Mexico), the Museum of Memory in Santiago (Chile).In 2017, he was invited by Christine Macel to be part of the exhibition "Viva Arte Viva" at the 57th International Exhibition of the Biennale di Venezia.

His work is part of several private and public collections around the world such as MoMA - Museum of Modern Art, New York (USA), MACBA - Museu d'Art Contemporani de Barcelona (Spain), PAMM - Pérez Art Museum Miami (USA), Kadist art foundation (France/USA) or MACVAL - Musée d'Art contemporain du Val-de-Marne, Vitry-sur-Seine (France).
