= Sonia Gomes =

Afro-Brazilian contemporary artist

- Born: 1948 (age 77–78); Caetanópolis, Brazil
- Known for: Sculpture

Sonia Gomes (Caetanópolis, Minas Gerais,1948) is a Brazilian contemporary artist who lives and works in São Paulo, Brazil. Gomes frequently employs found objects and textiles in her works, twisting, stretching, and bundling them to fashion wiry or knotty sculptural forms.

== Background ==
Sonia Gomes was born in 1948 to a Black mother and white father in Caetanópolis, a small town in Minas Gerais considered to be the birthplace of Brazil's textile industry. As a child, she showed an interest in deconstructing her clothes and creating her own jewelry from leftover fabric and found materials. Despite this early inclination towards artistic creation, Gomes initially pursued a career in law. In 1994, at the age of 45, Gomes left her legal career to attend the Guignard School of Art in Belo Horizonte, Minas Gerais. This pivotal decision marked her formal entry into the art world.

She credits her maternal grandmother with her interest in art. In a 2022 profile in Sculpture magazine she states, "My grandmother was Black; she was a sorceress and would bless people with a branch of a plant called arruda. It was a ritual she would perform, and the memory of it is really strong for me. Since then, I've always been interested in craft – in things made by hand and folk art and the festivals, rituals, churches, and processions."

In a 2024 interview, Gomes identified Afro-Brazilian artist Arthur Bispo do Rosário as a source of validation, noting they "share a visceral, collective memory that operates unconsciously" and that Bispo, and some other artists of African descent, paved the way for her and others in their struggles to have their practice recognized as art.

== Work ==
Correnteza (2018) at the National Gallery of Art in 2023

Gomes combines secondhand textiles with everyday materials, such as driftwood, wire, and furniture to create abstract sculptures. Her compositions stem from a spontaneous and casual practice of deconstructing and re-assembling everyday objects; Lágrima (Tear) (2014), for example, was made with a blue tablecloth that once belonged to her friend's family. Gomes created Correnteza (2018) using found driftwood and fabric forms she stitched to the wood; critic Paul Laster wrote in Sculpture that the juxtaposition of the fabric and wood created "a compelling tension."

Gomes' use of found and gifted objects is informed by her decolonial standpoint and is both a manifestation of Brazil’s rapid and uneven industrial development and a critique of Brazil's culture of wasteful consumption and environmental destruction. These materials, which arrive at her studio more or less by chance, guide her through the creative process and "always tell [her] what they want to be" as she reshapes and entangles them into one another. She often juxtaposes soft and hard materials, creating movement in her sculptures which allude to her love of popular Brazilian dances. Gomes's work features in international collections and is exhibited in the David Geffen Wing of the Museum of Modern Art. The artist is represented by Mendes Wood DM, Blum & Poe, and Pace Gallery.

In 2024, Gomes represented the Vatican at the Holy See Pavilion in the 60th Venice Biennale, Italy, participating in the "With My Eyes" group exhibition held in the Giudecca Women's Detention Center.

== Solo exhibitions ==
- ...vivem no compasso do sol, Mendes Wood DM, Paris (2024)
- Sonia Gomes: O mais profundo é a pele (Skin is the deepest part), Pace Gallery, New York (2022)
- When the sun rises in blue, Blum & Poe, Los Angeles (2021)
- I Rise – I’m a Black Ocean, Leaping and Wide, Museum Frieder Burda and Salon Berlin, Baden-Baden/Berlin (2019)
- Silence of color, Mendes Wood DM, Brussels (2019)
- Still I Rise, MASP – Museu de Arte de São Paulo / Casa de Vidro, São Paulo (2018)
- A vida renasce, sempre, Museu de Arte Contemporânea de Niterói, Rio de Janeiro (2018)

== Group exhibitions ==
- One Becomes Many, Pérez Art Museum Miami, Florida (2024-2026)
- Making Their Mark: Works from the Shah Garg Collection, Berkeley Art Museum and Pacific Film Archive (BAMPFA), 2024
- With My Eyes, 60th Venice Biennale, Venice, Italy (2024)
- HARD/SOFT, Vienna, Austria (2023)
- Tropic of Cancer, Palm Beach, US (2023)
- Arte na Moda: MASP Renner, São Paulo, Brazil (2024)
- Coreografias do impossível, 35th Bienal de São Paulo, São Paulo, Brazil (2023)
- Mãos: 35 anos da Mão Afro-Brasileira, São Paulo, Brazil (2023)
- Gwangju Biennial, Gwangju, Korea (2021)
- Liverpool Biennial, Liverpool, UK (2021)
- Unconscious Landscape – Works from the Ursula Hauser Collection, Hauser & Wirth, Somerset, UK (2019)
- Experimenting with Materiality, Lévy Gorvy, Zurich, Switzerland (2019)
- Histórias Afro-Atlânticas, MASP, São Paulo, Brazil (2018)
- O Triângulo Atlântico, 11ª Bienal de Artes Visuais do Mercosul, Porto Alegre, Brazil (2018)
- Tissage, Tressage, Fondation Villa Datris, L'Isle-sur-la-Sorgue, France (2018)
- Entangled, Turner Contemporary, Margate, UK (2017)
- Revival, The National Museum of Women in the Arts, Washington, USA (2017)
- All the World's Futures 56ª Biennale di Venezia, Venice, Italy (2015)
- The New Afro-Brazilian Hand, Museu Afro Brasil, Sao Paulo (2013)
- Art & Textiles – Fabric as Material and Concept in Modern Art, Kunstmuseum Wolfsburg, Germany (2013)

== Critical reception ==
Gomes came to international attention after her inclusion in the 56th Venice Biennale, curated by Okwui Enwezor. In the fall of 2022, Gomes presented a major solo show in New York. The New York Times art critic Jillian Steinhauer expressed her views on the show in early January 2023.

"If Gomes has a central theme, that may be it: a sense of willful connection, a determination to use what’s on hand to forge something unexpectedly beautiful."

== Public collections (selection) ==
- Museum of Modern Art
- Pérez Art Museum Miami
- National Gallery of Art, Washington DC
- Rubell Family Collection
- San Antonio Museum of Art
- Solomon R. Guggenheim
- Centre Pompidou, Paris
- Museu Afro Brasil, São Paulo
