= Leda Catunda =

20th and 21st-century Brazilian artist

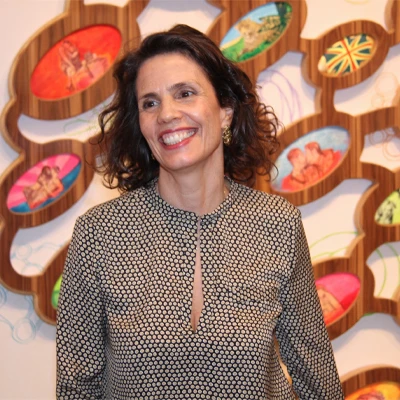
- Born: Leda Catunda Serra; June 23, 1961 (age 65); São Paulo, Brazil

Leda Catunda Serra, known as Leda Catunda (born 23 June, 1961) is a Brazilian painter, sculptor, graphic artist and educator. She is a representative name of the Geração 80 artists' group. Her works explore the limits of textures and materials, being characterized by her "soft paintings" over towels, bedclothes, leather, velvet and silk.

== Biography ==
Leda Catunda was born in 1961 in São Paulo. Her mother, Vera Catunda Serra, was an architect and landscaper and her father, Geraldo Serra Gomes, was and architect and a professor at the college of architecture and urbanism in Sao Paulo. Catunda attended Fundação Armando Álvares Penteado (FAAP) for college and was originally planning to pursue a career as a rock musician. However, with the support of faculty at FAAP who were important figures in the Brazilian art world, she began to create visual artworks. She studied under important figures such as Regina Silveira, Nelson Leirner, and Julio Plaza who played a significant role in the shaping of the contemporary art scene in Brazil after the 1980s artists coalition. She worked as a class monitor in a course given by artist Regina Silveira and established close relationships with art education and her teachers. Catunda graduated from FAAP in 1984.

== Artistic career ==
Catunda began creating artwork in college. While she was still a student at FAAP, Catunda began her work with mixed media. One of her earliest creations was a composition that was based on photographs of TV images and was used as the starting point for lithographs, paintings, and video texts. In 1984 Catunda began to find success in the art world with an exhibition called Como Vai Você, Geração 80? (How Are You Doing, 1980s Generation?) in Rio de Janeiro. This exhibition featured over 100 artists and focused on the new view of artistic paths opened by the 1980s artist cohort.

As Catunda developed as an artist, she began to shift her style from her descriptive, cartoonish style from her early career, into more geometric compositions with clearer colors, figurations, and exploration of texture. Paintings from Catunda's early career had a narrative character, using simple images, such as a lake or a house, that already existed and printed them onto blankets. For example, one of her early works called Vedação em quadrinhos is a printed fabric that Catunda "edited" using white paint to hide some of the features of the image. Later on in her career her work became more abstract through taking the printed fabric and cutting it into rounded organic shapes and focusing on negative space and contrast between flat surfaces and 3 dimensional areas in the work.

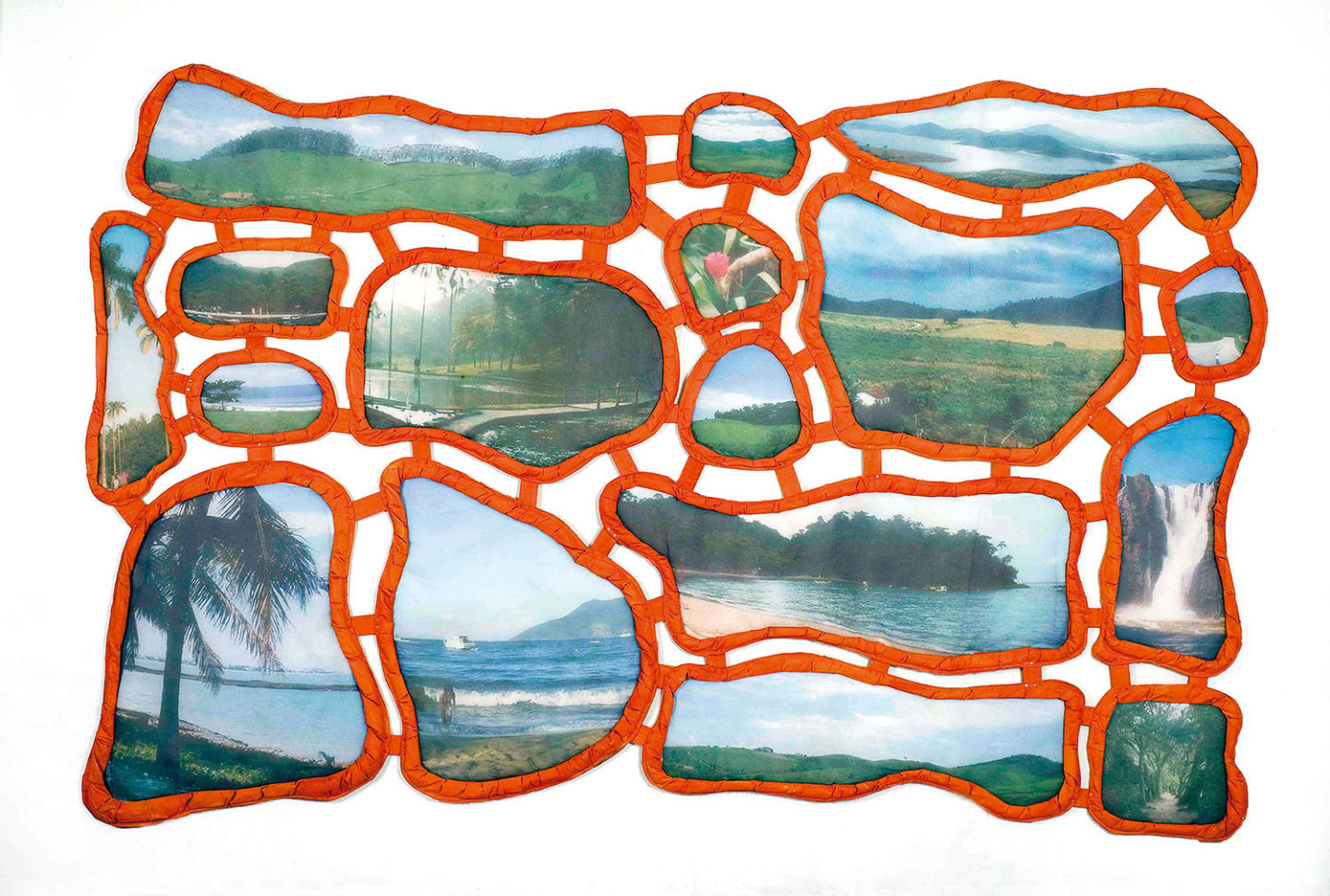
Leda Catunda, "Mundo Macio," (2007) Courtesy Fortes Vilaça, São Paulo

In early 2000s there was an emergence of "morulas" which are works made of many layers of fabric. During this time Catunda began to use personal images in her work by silk-screening them onto the fabric that she worked with. She used images of her friends and family through this method in multiple works including Todo o Pessoal (2006) and Todo o Pessoal II (2008). Additionally, in a 2007 piece titled Mundo Macio, Catunda used scraps of fabric printed with images of nature to create a wall tapestry. In this work she cut the fabric with images into organic shapes and connected these shapes with strings of orange fabric (as seen to the right). Throughout her career she continues to investigate topics such as critiques to consumerism in capitalist society, ironic approaches to society's everyday archetypes, use of heterodox materials, and the exploration of the frontier between painting and objects. Leda has had many exhibitions throughout her career so far. One of her most well known exhibitions is titled I love you baby and took place in 2016. This exhibition was shown in Instituto Tomie Ohtake in Sao Paulo Brazil. This exhibit was an 88 piece collection. In an interview, Leda explains that the exhibition "revolves on the subject matter of emotional consumerism related specifically to affection in those who search for things and images that in turn defines their own identity." This exhibition centered around the "selfie", a tool that Leda views as the most blatant declaration of self-centered love of all time. The show curator interprets the art as a comment on the global behavior of today's ritualized romance and hank-panky ego-trip by explaining that Catunda "has led her oeuvre to embrace the potent resonance inhabited by 'image-people' hysterically dedicated to their looks, shooting photos of themselves in the mirror and posting them online."

== Techniques and materials ==
Catunda primarily works in mixed media, creating paintings that utilize fabrics and textiles such as velvet, silk, and voile. She has created work using a variety of techniques including watercolor, collage, engraving, relief, painting, sewing, etc. Her style is categorized within the neo-pop expressionistic abstract movement. She focuses her art around topics of pop culture, consumerism, taste, and the idea of belonging. She creates "haptic works" which are stuffed, frilled and sewn onto domestic materials which ultimately turns the support itself into aspects of the piece. Catunda does not like to use machines to create her work, rather insists on manual creation which allows for an "intimate dimension" and a more personal atmosphere.
