= Blenheim Art Foundation =

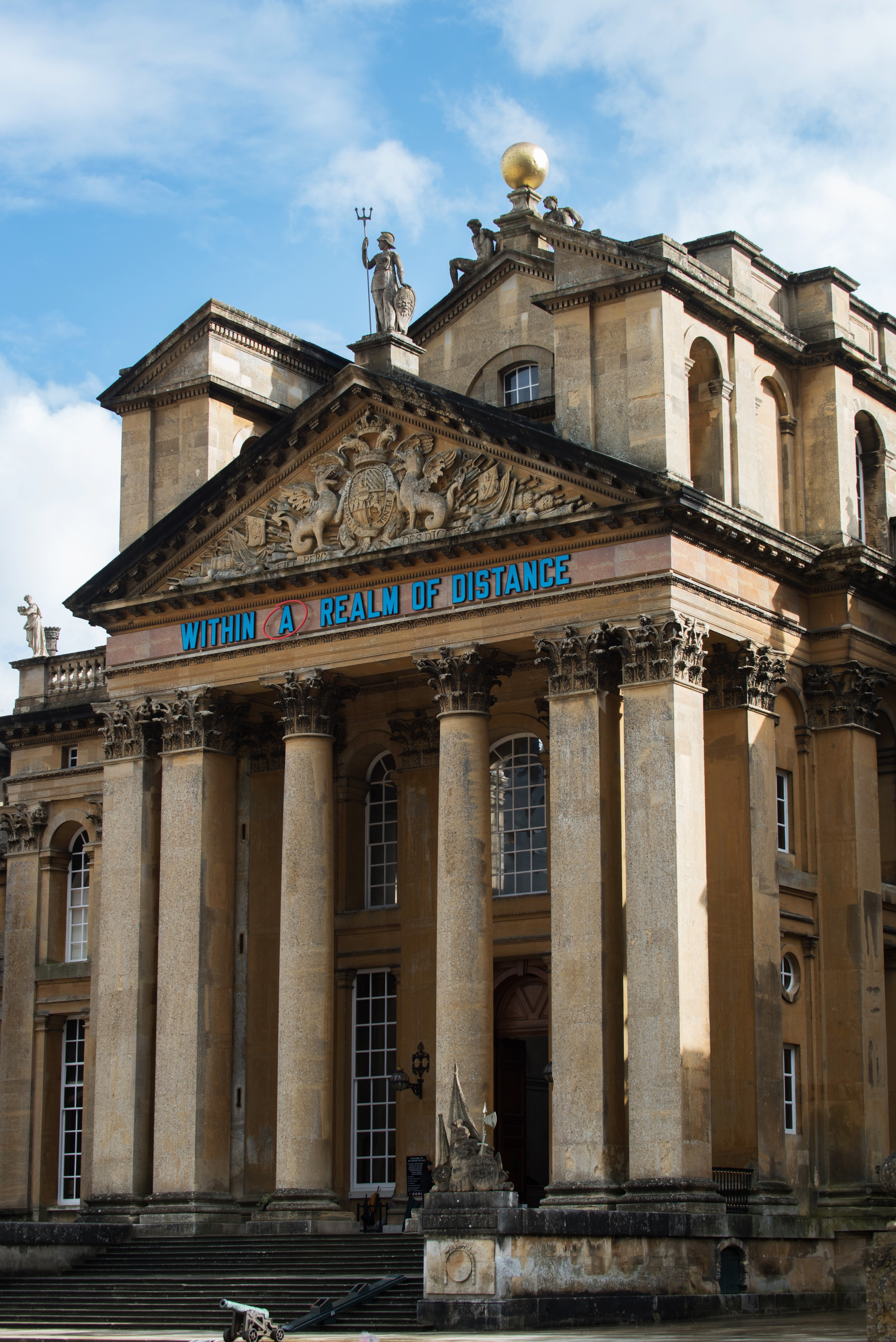
Lawrence Weiner Within a Realm of Distance at Blenheim Palace, 2015.

Blenheim Art Foundation (BAF) is a non-profit organisation that presents large-scale contemporary art exhibitions at Blenheim Palace.

BAF contains the work of many well-known artists within the historic setting of the Palace and its grounds. The programme has earned a reputation for challenging the "white cube" aesthetic that has become synonymous with the presentation of contemporary art. A UNESCO World Heritage Site since 1987, Blenheim is one of the country's most celebrated stately homes, attracting close to a million visitors a year from all over the world. With its diverse public, the programme also aims to open up new audiences to the discovery of modern and contemporary art. Alongside the contemporary art programme at Palace of Versailles, BAF has been praised for re-inventing the experience of heritage sites.

The foundation launched on 1 October 2014 with a survey exhibition by Ai Weiwei, which was the artist's largest UK exhibition to date. The programme continued in 2015 with an exhibition by Lawrence Weiner, followed by Michelangelo Pistoletto in 2016, Jenny Holzer in 2017, and Yves Klein in 2018, Maurizio Cattelan in 2019, and Cecily Brown in 2020. In 2021, the Foundation unveiled its eighth exhibition, an intervention by Tino Sehgal.

Blenheim Art Foundation was founded by Lord Edward Spencer-Churchill, son of the 11th Duke of Marlborough, John Spencer-Churchill. The director of the Foundation is Michael Frahm.

In 2016, Blenheim Art Foundation won Hudson's UK Heritage Award for Best Innovator and in 2019, Jenny Holzer's display at the Palace earned the Global Fine Art Awards' prize for 'Best Public Exhibition'.

== Exhibitions ==
=== Ai Weiwei at Blenheim Palace (2014) ===
Blenheim Art Foundation launched with the exhibition Ai Weiwei at Blenheim Palace, which took place 1 October 2014 – 26 April 2015. It was the "biggest UK retrospective to date" by Chinese artist and social activist Ai Weiwei, which presented more than 50 new and iconic artworks throughout the Palace and its grounds. Artworks ranged from photographs taken by Ai Weiwei while living in New York during the 1980s, to a 40 m (120 ft) long carpet created specifically for display in the Great Hall, where a 5.5 m (17 ft) glass chandelier was also hung. Also exhibited was a table formed from wood and reclaimed from temples dating to the Qing Dynasty (1644 - 1911), intricately hand-painted porcelain plates, and Circle of Animals/Zodiac Heads: Gold, Ai Weiwei's reinterpretation of the legendary bronze zodiac head statues that once surrounded the fountain-clock at Emperor Yuanming Yuan's Beijing imperial retreat.

Due to visitor figures, the exhibition Ai Weiwei at Blenheim Palace was extended for twice the planned duration, finally closing 26 April 2015. Critics focused on the fact that this was "the most extensive exhibition of his work to be staged in this country" and that Ai Weiwei, under house-arrest was never able to leave China to see the exhibition, which also marked the inauguration of Blenheim Art Foundation.

=== Within a Realm of Distance: Lawrence Weiner at Blenheim Palace (2015) ===
Blenheim Art Foundation's second exhibition, Within A Realm Of Distance, ran 10 October – 20 December 2015. The exhibition displayed works by American artist and founding figure of Conceptual Art, Lawrence Weiner, who has been using language as a sculptural medium throughout his fifty year career to make interventions into outdoor and indoor spaces. The exhibition included existing works by the artist, in addition to new site-specific works created especially for the Palace. Works were integrated throughout the Palace interiors, such as on the ceiling of the Long Library which featured Weiner's More Than Enough (2015), and Far Enough Away As To Come Readily To Hand (2015) in the 1st State Room that replaced part of the tapestry of the Battle of Blenheim. The title work 'Within A Realm Of Distance' (2015) was installed on the exterior frieze of the Baroque 18th-century building.

Within a Realm of Distance was conceived by the artist in collaboration with Blenheim Art Foundation and co-curator Christian Gether, Director, ARKEN Museum of Modern Art.

=== Michelangelo Pistoletto at Blenheim Palace (2016) ===
Michelangelo Pistoletto at Blenheim Palace was a solo exhibition running 15 September – 31 December 2016. The show spanned Pistoletto's prolific fifty-year career, exhibiting painting, sculpture, and new, site-specific installations within the palace and the surrounding grounds. The show also introduced visitors to the themes which have underpinned his work across the decades. Pistoletto gave a playful crash-course in Italian history, referencing the Renaissance and Fascism in turn. Classical Antiquity collided with post-war consumerism in his Venus of the Rags, which sees the Classical goddess leaning against a large pile of waste material from textile factories. This work, an iconic piece from the Arte Povera period of 1960s–70s Italy, exemplifies Pistoletto's anti-establishment use of cheap and unconventional materials to make high art; a provocative move which started an artistic revolution and cemented him as one of the most influential artists of the twentieth century.

Reflection and self-reflection were also central ideas to the exhibition, which showcased a spectacular collection of thirty of Pistoletto's celebrated Mirror Paintings, photo-silkscreened images on polished steel which project the viewer's reflection into the picture plane, encouraging playful interaction. Blenheim Palace itself was also a muse for a new work called Mirage, which sees a gold-painted car – inspired by the golden balls perched atop of the building – submerged by the water of the palace fountains.

As well as celebrating the breadth of Pistoletto's materials and techniques, the show also introduced Pistoletto the political philosopher, with many of his lyrical, colourful works underpinned with strong pacifist messages and calls for unity, collaboration, and freedom. His striking Mappamondo, a globe made of burnished newspaper, was remade for Blenheim Palace using material from British journalism. The breathtaking Third Paradise symbol, wrapped in Pistoletto's signature rags, hovered above the Great Hall, calling for a reassessment of current society and a more harmonious, unified future. Another work on these themes is the poignantly-named Love Difference, a table in the shape of the Mediterranean basin around which its bordering countries are gathered, represented by chairs in different styles and sizes. The work suggests the positivity of national and cultural difference, and the need for communication and exchange. It is a piece which has never felt more current in today's climate.

=== SOFTER: Jenny Holzer at Blenheim Palace (2017) ===
SOFTER: Jenny Holzer at Blenheim Palace (28 September – 31 December 2017) was a solo exhibition by American artist Jenny Holzer. The exhibition featured over fifty works concerning themes of modern conflict, history and memory. The first time Holzer visited Blenheim Palace, she became fascinated by the Palace's own military history – not only the birthplace of Sir Winston Churchill but also built as a reward to John Churchill, 1st Duke of Marlborough for the Duke's military victory against the French and Bavarians in the 1704 Battle of Blenheim. Holzer took this as a starting point to look at the timeless and universal theme of war, across history and countries. The exhibition showcased the breadth of Holzer's practice, from paintings, stoneworks, and electronic signs, to installations of black mondo grass and displays of human bones. Many of the works were site-specific, made in response to the Palace. Amongst these featured the light projection display ON WAR hosted for twelve nights after dark at the Palace. Using ten projectors beaming Holzer's text onto the Palace facade, this was Holzer's most ambitious light projection display to date.

The exhibition also features a bespoke virtual reality app OF WAR, activated at Blenheim Palace. The app realises a long-held ambition of Holzer's to explore her practice and the way we interact with art in the digital space.

SOFTER: Jenny Holzer at Blenheim Palace was recognised as 'Best Public Exhibition' at the 2018 Global Fine Art Awards (GFAA) black-tie gala at the Harold Pratt Mansion in New York City.

==== Text sources ====
Since 1993, Holzer has increasingly worked with text from outside sources. For her exhibition at Blenheim Palace, she partnered with The Not Forgotten Association (NFA), a British charity that serves the needs of wounded, injured, disabled, and sick service members and ex-service members of the British military by providing a community and putting fun, enthusiasm, energy and enjoyment back into their lives. The NFA collected testimonies from over fifty veterans and serving personnel in the UK. Further text drew from firsthand testimonies of refugees and others affected by the conflict in Syria, collected by charities Save the Children and Human Rights Watch, and from Polish poet Anna Świrszczyńska who wrote about her experiences in Warsaw during World War II and the Warsaw Uprising. In selecting excerpts from this extensive archive of first-person testimonials, Holzer addressed how an understanding of war and violence cannot be abstracted from its lived experience.

=== Yves Klein at Blenheim Palace (2018) ===
Yves Klein at Blenheim Palace (18 July – 7 October 2018), presented in collaboration with the Yves Klein Estate, coincided with what would have been the artist's ninetieth birthday year. It explored concepts of beauty, sensibility and the sublime, offering visitors a unique opportunity to view the artist's seminal artworks in the landmark setting of the World Heritage eighteenth-century Palace.

Featuring over 50 artworks, the exhibition invited visitors to explore Klein's wide-ranging practice, including painting, sculpture and large-scale installation. One of the most influential artists of his generation, his pioneering artistic experiments anticipated and inspired movements in conceptual art, minimalism and performance art. Klein is best known for the development of his own vivid ultramarine pigment, International Klein Blue (IKB), which became a symbolic part of his practice, a key to reaching the 'infinite' and 'sublime' through pure colour.

Yves Klein at Blenheim Palace featured a large-scale blue pigment installation and a number of Klein's Monochrome Paintings, the dazzling uninterrupted colour punctuating and transforming the visitor's experience of the opulent baroque surroundings of The Great Hall and principal rooms. A painting from his groundbreaking Anthropometry series was also on display, for which Klein employed models as 'living brushes' to create marks on the canvas in front of an audience, as well as one of his late Fire Paintings and works in gold. Klein blended traditional artistic mediums and imagery with dynamic techniques and performance, erasing the boundaries between process and artwork. Sponge Sculptures, made from the sponges Klein painted with saturated with pigment, were exhibited alongside twelve free-standing Blue Venus sculptures coated in IKB, installed in the Saloon and inspired by Classical Greek sculpture. Pigment Tables in IKB, gold and pink were shown in the 3rd State Room, while Relief Portraits of the artist Arman and composer Claude Pascal, Klein's childhood friends, were installed in the Long Library. To accompany the exhibition, a timeline and archive photography of the artist's life were installed in The Gallery in the Stables Courtyard.

=== Maurizio Cattelan at Blenheim Palace (2019) ===
Blenheim Art Foundation's sixth exhibition at the Palace was 'Victory is Not an Option', a solo exhibition by Maurizio Cattelan (12 September – 27 October 2019). This was Cattelan's first and most significant solo exhibition in the UK in twenty years and featured new works specially made for the show alongside a number of his most iconic pieces such as Novecento (1997), La Nona Ora (1999) and Him (2001) displayed throughout the 18th century Palace, engaging with Blenheim's history and unique setting. The exhibition also notably featured America (2016) – one of Cattelan's most recognisable works – a solid 18-Karat gold toilet which was installed inside the Palace, adjacent to Sir Winston Churchill's birth room. As a fully functioning toilet, visitors were welcome to use it during their visit and experience a rare individual encounter with one of contemporary art's most famous works. On 14 September 2019, the artwork was stolen in an overnight burglary at Blenheim Palace.

=== Cecily Brown at Blenheim Palace (2020) ===
In September 2020, Blenheim Art Foundation unveiled a major solo exhibition by acclaimed British artist Cecily Brown at Blenheim Palace, running from 17 September 2020 to 3 January 2021. This is the first exhibition in the Foundation's programme to be composed entirely of new work created in response to the Palace, and the first devoted to contemporary painting.

This exhibition marked a new area of investigation for Brown, one of the foremost painters of her generation who is best known for her semi-abstract, sensuous depictions of the body. Showcasing over thirty never-seen-before site-specific artworks, Brown offered both a sentimental celebration and a poignant critique of the romantic fantasies surrounding the stately home and British heritage in the popular imagination. Drawing on traditional painting genres often found in country houses and responding directly to the Spencer-Churchill family's own collection of artworks, textiles and artefacts, Brown offered charged reinterpretations of the powerful imagery and narratives that still inform perceptions of England today. The exhibition included a series dedicated to the hunt, Brown's distinctive strokes depicting animals in tussle in the British woodlands, and a number of battle paintings that evoked Blenheim's military history and called attention to the martial motifs throughout the Palace interiors and architecture. The exhibition also featured The Triumph of Death (2019), Brown's largest painting to date.

=== Tino Sehgal at Blenheim Park & Gardens (2021) ===
In July and August 2021, Blenheim Art Foundation hosted a major solo exhibition by Tino Sehgal. This was the first exhibition at Blenheim designed specifically for the park and gardens at Blenheim Palace and the eighth exhibition in the Foundation's contemporary programme. Known for his artworks using the human body, voice, and social interaction, for this project Sehgal presented a complex, roaming choreography imagined for Blenheim, involving more than 50 local participants.

The exhibition took place entirely outdoors: a decision inspired both by the natural beauty of Capability Brown's landscape architecture at Blenheim, and a response to the extended closure of cultural sites due to the Covid-19 pandemic. The aim of the exhibition was to bring together the community in a safe and inspiring setting and challenge the way visitors behave and connect with strangers. There were no static artworks placed throughout the palace and instead the exhibition took shape as a series of live artworks across different areas of the grounds. Not only had Sehgal never worked on such a large scale, but it was the first time an exhibition of this nature had been presented at a stately home in Britain.

=== Mohammed Sami at Blenheim Palace (2024) ===
In January 2024, Blenheim Art Foundation announced their ninth contemporary art exhibition by Iraqi artist Mohammed Sami. Featuring all new work, the exhibition will coincide with the Art Foundation's 10-year anniversary.

== Collection ==
Alongside its programme of temporary art exhibitions, Blenheim Art Foundation has begun to build a collection of contemporary artworks by the greatest living artists of our time. The collection ranges from large-scale installation to painting and sculpture to be on permanent display at the Palace, alongside the existing Palace collections. Currently on display is Georg Baselitz's monumental outdoor sculpture Untitled (2013), a contemporary response to Antonio Canova's sculpture The Three Graces (1814–1817), installed on Blenheim's South Lawn.

== Blenheim Palace ==
Blenheim Palace is an English country house situated in the civil parish of Blenheim near Woodstock, Oxfordshire, United Kingdom. The Palace was a gift from Queen Anne to the 1st Duke of Marlborough for his victory at the Battle of Blenheim in 1704. Designated by the United Nations as a World Heritage Site in 1987, Blenheim Palace is also the birthplace of Sir Winston Churchill. Handed down through successive generations, the palace continues to be resided in by the Spencer-Churchill family and is the official seat of the current and 12th Duke of Marlborough, Jamie Spencer-Churchill.
