= Lucas Arruda =

Brazilian painter (born 1983)

Lucas Arruda (born 1983, São Paulo), is a Brazilian painter living and working in São Paulo, Brazil. He received his Bachelor of Fine Arts from Faculty of Santa Marcelina, São Paulo, Brazil in 2009. He was at the forefront of a generation of artists in Brazil who reclaimed painting in an art scene then largely dominated by conceptual art. He is known for his atmospheric landscape paintings that exist at the border between abstraction and figuration, between mnemonic and imaginative registers. Characterized by their subtle rendition of light and a meditative quality, Arruda's landscapes are charged with visual as well as metaphysical questions.

== Work ==
Lucas Arruda's work and research develops fundamentally around landscape and light as well-defined themes within art historical canon in order to examine complex contemporary mental states. His work is often displayed in series of small-format paintings grouped under the title "Deserto-Modelo", a term he borrowed from the Brazilian poet Joao Cabral de Melo Neto in order to emphasize the idea of prototype and repetition, "allied to the metaphor of the desert understood as an atemporal place that can't be grasped through language". Describing himself as "an artist that works with paint", in his exhibitions, Arruda often extends the landscape beyond the painting by using light installations and slide projections, achieving "a live experience that operates through the mediation of light and the gaze" as noted by curator Hans Ulrich Obrist.

While early reviews of Arruda's work tended to inscribe his paintings within the Romantic sublime tradition and referenced artists like Caspar David Friedrich and Edward Hopper, Arruda himself, in citing influences, rather refers to J. M. W. Turner's late work, the Venezuelan artist Armando Reverón's landscape paintings and Giorgio Morandi, emphasizing the mathematical and metaphysical impulses in his work, and insists on "the idea of landscape as a structure, rather than a real place".

== Influence ==
Lucas Arruda's redefining of landscape painting by infusing elements traditional to seascapes with elements of abstraction and impressionism has gained recognition, as evidenced by his inclusion in Phaidon's Vitamin P3, a collection that highlights groundbreaking artists shaping contemporary painting. In the first edition of Magma, edited by Paul Olivennes, Arruda is featured among notable contemporaries, presenting art and literary works associated with the modern revival of avant-garde aesthetics. This publication featured a previously unpublished painting by Arruda to accompany the poem "La Maison des Sables" (1965) by French poet and post-colonial philosopher Édouard Glissant.

== Publications ==
- Lucas Arruda. Deserto-Modelo (2022, Verlag der Buchhandlung Walther & Franz König, ISBN 978-3-7533-0252-2)
- Lucas Arruda: Deserto-Modelo (2020, David Zwirner Books, ISBN 978-1-64423-041-1)
- Lucas Arruda (2018, Cahiers d'Art & Editora Cobogó, ISBN 978-65-5691-031-4)
