= Museu Afro Brasil =

Museum in São Paulo, Brazil

Museum Afro Brasil
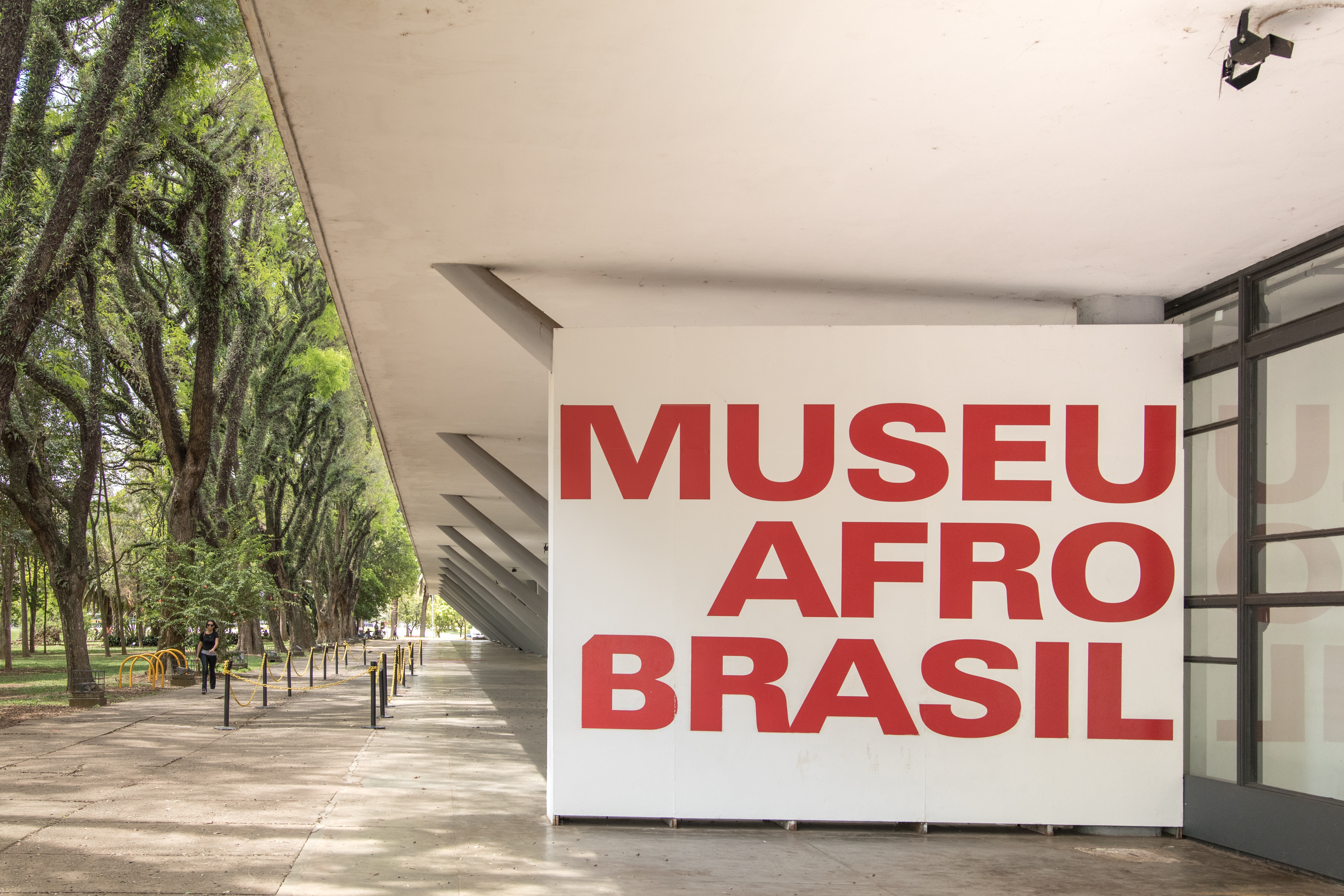

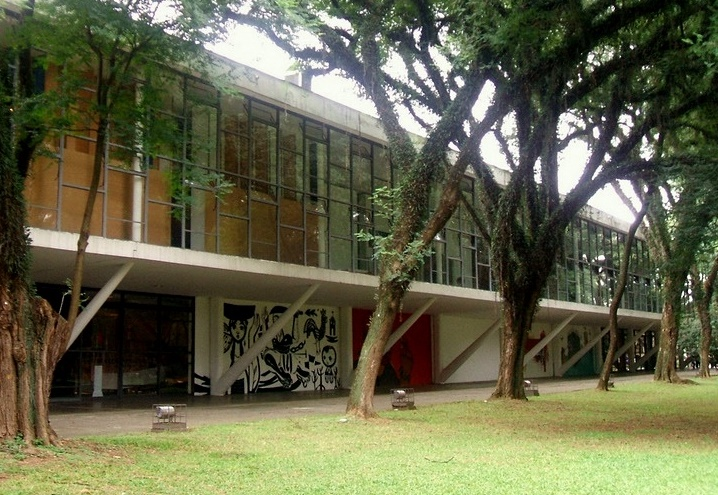
- Established: 2004
- Location: Ibirapuera Park, Brazil
- Coordinates: 23°35′02″S 46°39′33″W
- Director: Emanoel Araújo
- Website: www.museuafrobrasil.org.br
- Location of Museu Afro Brasil

Museu Afro Brasil is a history, artistic and ethnographic museum dedicated to the research, preservation, and exhibition of objects and works related to the cultural sphere of black people in Brazil. It is a public institution held by the Secretariat for Culture of the São Paulo State and managed by the Museu Afro Brasil Association. The museum is located in Ibirapuera Park, a major urban park in São Paulo. The Manoel da Nóbrega Pavilion, designed by Oscar Niemeyer in 1959, houses the Museum. It holds around 6 thousands items and pieces including paintings, sculptures, photos, documents, and archives created between the 15th Century and the present day. The aggregation of pieces includes many works of the African and Afro-Brazilian cultural spheres, ranging from subjects and topics such as religion, labor, and art to the African Diaspora and slavery, whilst registering and affirming the historical trajectory and the African influences in the construction of the Brazilian society. The Museum also offers a diverse range of cultural and didactic activities, temporary expositions, and contains a theater and a specialized library.

== History ==
Museu Afro Brasil was established in 2004 by Emanoel Araújo, former director and curator of the Pinacoteca do Estado de São Paulo, artist from Bahia. Araújo, since 2004 has been director of the museum.

== Organization ==
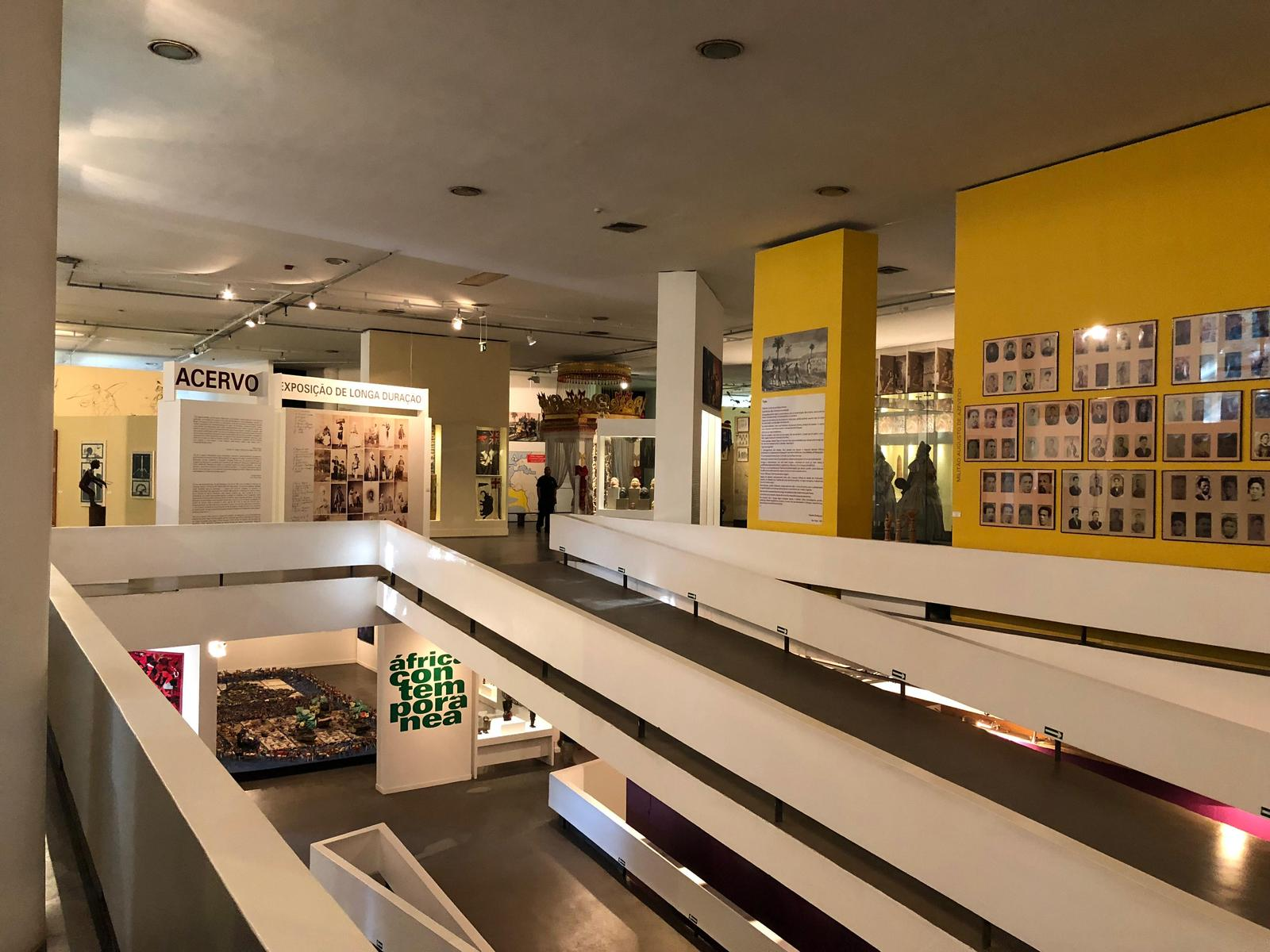
Interior of the museum.

The museum's collection is divided into several sections with different areas: Africa, labor, slavery, sacred and profane, Afro-Brazilian religions, history and memory, and the arts.

In the 20th century art section, there are important works made by Afro-Brazilian artists such as Benedito José Tobias, Rubem Valentim, Heitor dos Prazeres, Ronaldo Rego, Octavio Araujo, Manuel Messiah, Caetano Dias, José Hyginus, Tiberius, Jorge Luis dos Anjos as well works by Master Didi. Other parts of the collection include works by Madalena Schwartz, Sergio Valle Duarte, Alfred Weidinger, Joseph Pace, André Vilaron, Eustaquio Neves, and Walter Firmo.

Museu Afro Brasil has the largest Afro-descendant art collection in the Americas, with more than 5,000 objects, including paintings, sculpture, lithography, photographs, documents, and ethnological objects. The museum offers many different aspects of Afro-Brazilian culture such as religion, work, art, African diaspora and slavery in Brazil. The museum also exhibits the African influences on Brazilian society and culture.

== Events ==
In 2014, for the tenth anniversary of the museum and concurrent with the 2014 FIFA World Cup, Museu Afro Brasil created an exhibit entitled O Negro no Futebol Brasileiro – A arte e os Artistas (The black man in Brazilian soccer – The art and its artists). This exhibit highlighted the presence of soccer players of African ancestry, such as Pelé, Garrincha, Didi, Djalma Santos, Barbosa, Zizinho, and Jairzinho and their importance in Brazilian history and in constructing of the Brazilian national identity. Besides the photos and caricatures of notorious Brazilian soccer players, a part of the exposition was the establishment of the Stadium, the Football Votive Masks by two artists from Benin: Aston and Kifouli and Mundial Brasileiro, the rotating costume jewelry sculpture portraying a large soccer ball by the Italian artist Joseph Pace, and the work Diamante Negro – Inventor da Bicicleta (2014), an acrylic spray on canvas, by Brazilian graffiti artist, Speto.

== Gallery ==
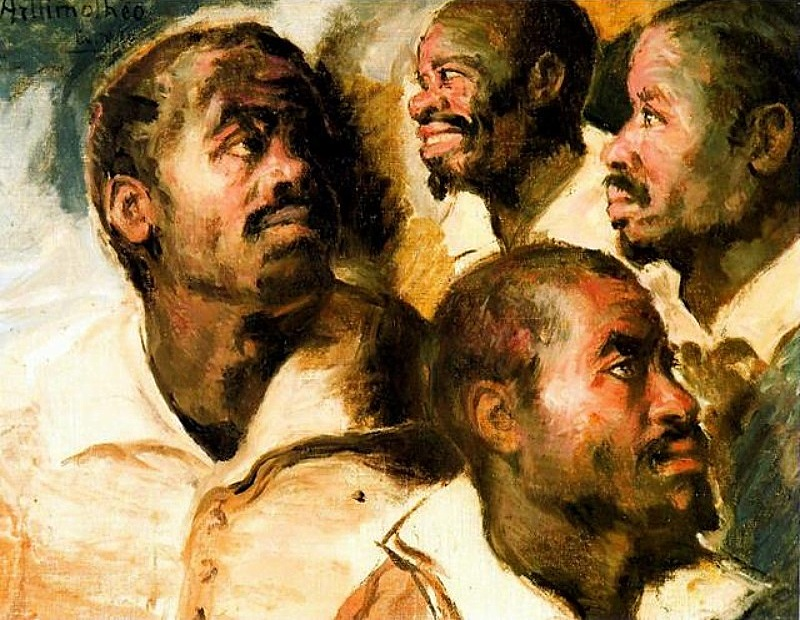
Artur Timóteo da Costa
Study of the Craniums

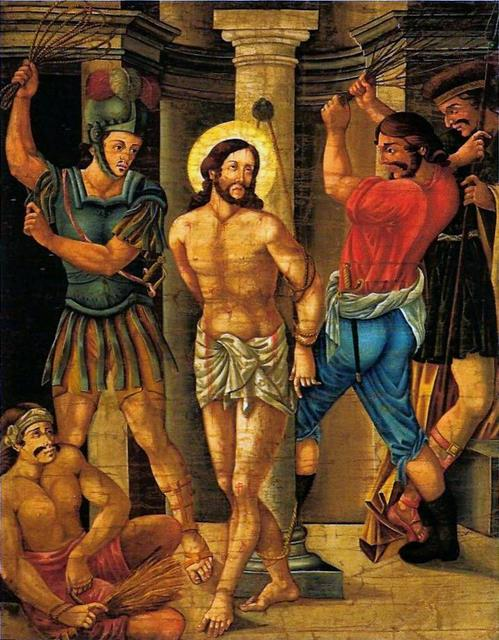
Joaquim José da Natividade
Bandeiras da Procissão de Cristo

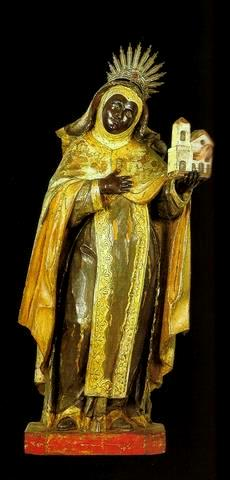
Santa Ifigênia

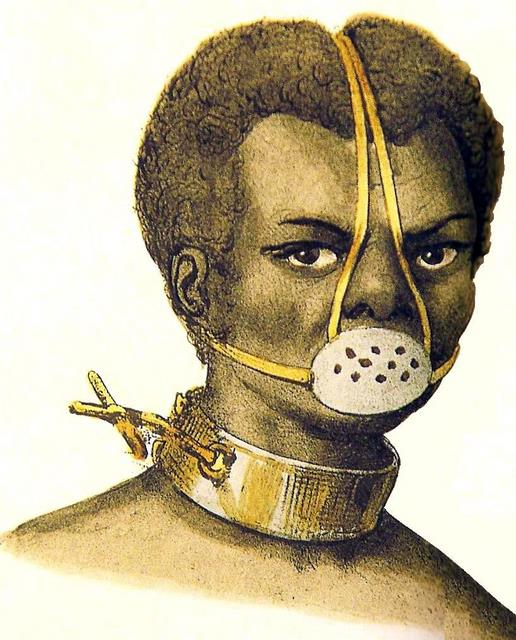
Jacques Etienne Arago
Punishment of slaves

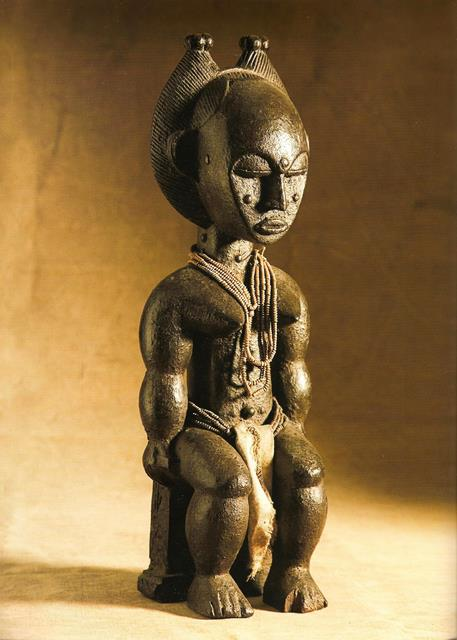
African Goddess Attie

== See also ==
- Museo Afro-Brasileiro, another museum in Salvador, Bahia.
