= Swimming at the 1936 Summer Olympics – Men's 1500 metre freestyle =

Men's 1500 metre freestyle at the Games of the XI Olympiad
- Venue: Olympiapark Schwimmstadion Berlin
- Date: 13 August 1936 (heats); 14 August 1936 (semifinals); 15 August 1936 (final)
- Competitors: 21 from 10 nations
- Winning time: 19:13.7

Medalists
1st place, gold medalist(s)		Noboru Terada	Japan
2nd place, silver medalist(s)		Jack Medica	United States
3rd place, bronze medalist(s)		Shumpei Uto	Japan

The men's 1500 metre freestyle was a swimming event held as part of the swimming at the 1936 Summer Olympics programme. It was the seventh appearance of the event, which was established in 1908. The competition was held from Thursday to Saturday, 13 to 15 August 1936.

Twenty-one swimmers from ten nations competed.

== Records ==
These were the standing world and Olympic records (in minutes) prior to the 1936 Summer Olympics.

World record	19:07.2	(Sweden) Arne Borg	Bologna (ITA)	2 September 1927
Olympic record	19:12.4	(Japan) Kusuo Kitamura	Los Angeles (USA)	13 August 1932

== Results ==
=== Heats ===
Thursday 13 August 1936: The fastest three in each heat and the next two fastest from across the heats advanced to the semi-finals.

Heat 1

Place	Swimmer	Time	Qual.
1	Sunao Ishiharada (JPN)	19:55.8	QQ
2	Bob Leivers (GBR)	20:04.4	QQ
3	Heinz Arendt (GER)	20:10.7	QQ
4	Bob Pirie (CAN)	20:16.4	qq
5	Manoel Villar (BRA)	21:49.9	
6	István Angyal (HUN)		

Heat 2

Place	Swimmer	Time	Qual.
1	Jack Medica (USA)	19:55.5	QQ
1	Noboru Terada (JPN)	19:55.5	QQ
3	Jørgen Jørgensen (DEN)	21:42.0	QQ
4	Robert Hooper (CAN)	21:47.4	
5	João Havelange (BRA)	22:54.1	

Heat 3

Place	Swimmer	Time	Qual.
1	Shumpei Uto (JPN)	19:48.3	QQ
2	Ralph Flanagan (USA)	19:49.9	QQ
3	Hans Freese (GER)	20:13.7	QQ
4	Christian Talli (FRA)	21:03.0	qq
5	Bob Hamerton (CAN)	21:05.5	
6	Aage Hellstrøm (DEN)	21:16.9	

Heat 4

Place	Swimmer	Time	Qual.
1	Jim Cristy (USA)	20:26.5	QQ
2	Norman Wainwright (GBR)	20:47.6	QQ
3	Otto Przywara (GER)	20:59.0	QQ
4	Edmund Pader (AUT)	21:13.9	

=== Semifinals ===
Friday 14 August 1936: The fastest three in each semi-final and the fastest fourth-placed from across the heats advanced to the final.

Semifinal 1

Place	Swimmer	Time	Qual.
1	Noboru Terada (JPN)	19:48.6	QQ
2	Ralph Flanagan (USA)	19:59.4	QQ
3	Bob Leivers (GBR)	20:10.0	QQ
4	Jim Cristy (USA)	20:25.8	
5	Hans Freese (GER)	20:27.6	
6	Otto Przywara (GER)	20:55.0	
7	Jørgen Jørgensen (DEN)	21:46.3	

Semifinal 2

Place	Swimmer	Time	Qual.
1	Jack Medica (USA)	19:42.8	QQ
2	Sunao Ishiharada (JPN)	19:53.9	QQ
3	Shumpei Uto (JPN)	19:55.6	QQ
4	Heinz Arendt (GER)	19:56.1	qq
5	Norman Wainwright (GBR)	20:14.4	
6	Bob Pirie (CAN)	20:17.3	
7	Christian Talli (FRA)	21:09.8	

=== Final ===
Saturday 15 August 1936:

Place	Swimmer	Time
1	Noboru Terada (JPN)	19:13.7
2	Jack Medica (USA)	19:34.0
3	Shumpei Uto (JPN)	19:34.5
4	Sunao Ishiharada (JPN)	19:48.5
5	Ralph Flanagan (USA)	19:54.8
6	Bob Leivers (GBR)	19:57.4
7	Heinz Arendt (GER)	19:59.0
