= Swimming at the 1936 Summer Olympics – Men's 400 metre freestyle =

Men's 400 metre freestyle at the Games of the XI Olympiad
- Venue: Olympiapark Schwimmstadion Berlin
- Date: 10 August 1936 (heats); 11 August 1936 (semifinals); 12 August 1936 (final)
- Competitors: 36 from 16 nations
- Winning time: 4:44.5 OR

Medalists
1st place, gold medalist(s)		Jack Medica	United States
2nd place, silver medalist(s)		Shunpei Uto	Japan
3rd place, bronze medalist(s)		Shozo Makino	Japan

The men's 400 metre freestyle was a swimming event held as part of the swimming at the 1936 Summer Olympics programme. It was the seventh appearance of the event, which was established in 1908. The competition was held from Monday to Wednesday, 10 to 12 August 1936.

Thirty-four swimmers from 16 nations competed.

== Records ==
These were the standing world and Olympic records (in minutes) prior to the 1936 Summer Olympics.

World record	4:38.7	(United States) Jack Medica	Honolulu (USA)	30 August 1934
Olympic record	4:48.4	(United States) Buster Crabbe	Los Angeles (USA)	10 August 1932

In the fifth heat Shunpei Uto set a new Olympic record with 4:45.5 minutes. In the final Jack Medica bettered the Olympic record with 4:44.5 minutes.

== Results ==
=== Heats ===
Monday 10 August 1936: The fastest two in each heat and the next two fastest from across the heats advanced to the semi-finals.

==== Heat 1 ====
Place	Swimmer	Time	Qual.
1	Hiroshi Negami (JPN)	4:52.6	QQ
2	John Macionis (USA)	4:57.1	QQ
3	Heinz Arendt (GER)	4:57.2	qq
4	Árpád Lengyel (HUN)	4:57.7	
5	Edmund Pader (AUT)	5:16.9	
6	Robert Hooper (CAN)	5:17.2	

==== Heat 2 ====
Place	Swimmer	Time	Qual.
1	Bob Leivers (GBR)	4:57.2	QQ
2	Otto Przywara (GER)	5:11.7	QQ
3	Aage Hellstrøm (DEN)	5:18.2	
4	João Havelange (BRA)	5:31.5	

==== Heat 3 ====
Place	Swimmer	Time	Qual.
1	Shozo Makino (JPN)	4:51.3	QQ
2	Ralph Flanagan (USA)	4:54.7	QQ
3	Norman Wainwright (GBR)	5:03.6	
4	Bob Hamerton (CAN)	5:13.3	
5	Jørgen Jørgensen (DEN)	5:17.8	
6	István Angyal (HUN)	5:20.9	
7	Werner Lehmann (SUI)	5:36.8	

==== Heat 4 ====
Place	Swimmer	Time	Qual.
1	Ödön Gróf (HUN)	4:59.4	QQ
2	Hans Freese (GER)	5:03.1	QQ
3	Heikki Hietanen (FIN)	5:08.9	
4	William Pearson (GBR)	5:12.7	
5	Aluizio Lage (BRA)	5:18.3	
6	Washington Guzmán (CHI)	5:19.1	
7	Franz Seltenheim (AUT)	5:38.3	

==== Heat 5 ====
Place	Swimmer	Time	Qual.
1	Shunpei Uto (JPN)	4:45.5	QQ OR
2	Jean Taris (FRA)	4:53.9	QQ
3	Bob Pirie (CAN)	4:56.0	qq
4	Poul Petersen (DEN)	5:20.3	
5	Edmund Cooper (BER)	5:53.8	

==== Heat 6 ====
Place	Swimmer	Time	Qual.
1	Jack Medica (USA)	4:55.9	QQ
2	Walter Ledgard (PER)	5:05.5	QQ
3	Piet Stam (NED)	5:07.8	
4	Manoel Villar (BRA)	5:18.2	
5	Hans Brenner (SUI)	5:33.8	

=== Semifinals ===
Tuesday 11 August 1936: The fastest three in each semi-final and the fastest fourth-placed advanced to the final.

Semifinal 1

Place	Swimmer	Time	Qual.
1	Shunpei Uto (JPN)	4:48.4	QQ
2	Ralph Flanagan (USA)	4:49.9	QQ
3	Hiroshi Negami (JPN)	4:55.4	QQ
4	John Macionis (USA)	4:56.4	
5	Hans Freese (GER)	4:58.5	
6	Bob Pirie (CAN)	4:58.7	
7	Ödön Gróf (HUN)	5:01.9	

Semifinal 2

Place	Swimmer	Time	Qual.
1	Shozo Makino (JPN)	4:48.2	QQ
1	Jack Medica (USA)	4:48.2	QQ
3	Jean Taris (FRA)	4:53.6	QQ
4	Bob Leivers (GBR)	4:55.7	qq
5	Heinz Arendt (GER)	5:13.4	
6	Otto Przywara (GER)	5:14.9	

=== Final ===
Wednesday 12 August 1936:

Place	Swimmer	Time
1	Jack Medica (USA)	4:44.5 OR
2	Shunpei Uto (JPN)	4:45.6
3	Shozo Makino (JPN)	4:48.1
4	Ralph Flanagan (USA)	4:52.7
5	Hiroshi Negami (JPN)	4:53.6
6	Jean Taris (FRA)	4:53.8
7	Bob Leivers (GBR)	5:00.9
