= Hans Brenner =

Hans Brenner may refer to:

- Hans Brenner (actor) (1938–1998), Austrian actor
- Hans Brenner (swimmer) (1912–1977), Swiss swimmer
