= Jim Cristy =

American swimmer

- Cristy circa 1932

Personal information
- Full name: James Crapo Cristy, Jr.
- Nickname: "Jim"
- National team: United States
- Born: January 22, 1913 Detroit, Michigan, US
- Died: June 7, 1989 (aged 76) Kalamazoo, Michigan, US

Sport
- Sport: Swimming
- Strokes: Freestyle, Distance
- Club: Lake Shore Athletic Club
- College team: University of Michigan; 1934 Graduate
- Coach: Matthew Mann; Michigan
Medal record
Men's swimming
Representing the United States
Olympic Games
Bronze medal – third place	1932 Los Angeles	1500 m freestyle

James Crapo Cristy, Jr. (January 22, 1913 – June 7, 1989) was a financial manager for the Updike Company, and a school board President. He was an American competition swimmer who specialized in distance freestyle events while swimming at the University of Michigan in the early 1930s. He won a bronze medal for the United States at the 1932 Summer Olympics in Los Angeles, California in the 1500-meter swim, edging out his better-known freestyle distance rival and future actor Buster Crabbe, who had taken a bronze in the event in the previous Olympics in Amsterdam. Though his career would be in insurance and as a long-serving financial manager for Upjohn Company pharmaceuticals in Kalamazoo, in his spare time he would take an interest in public office, and serve as an elected school board member of the small Kellogg Consolidated School system. In 1961, he would run as a delegate to Michigan's constitutional convention and in 1968 be appointed by successive Michigan governors to serve on an advisory board to investigate options for public employee pensions and retirement funding.

== Early life ==
James C. Cristy Jr. was born to James Crapo Cristy and Laura Hart in Detroit, Michigan on January 22, 1913, and was the youngest of around four siblings.

== Swimming for Michigan ==
Though Cristy was not known to have any High School experience as a team swimmer, with the outstanding performances he demonstrated by his Sophomore year, Michigan swim coaches believed he could become one of their outstanding distance swimmers. Under the training of Michigan Head Coach Matthew Mann, in a highlight of his collegiate swimming career in 1932, he beat teammate Frank Kennedy for the Big 10 conference crown in the 440-yard distance freestyle.

As a freshman, he finished second in a 500-yard competition against Detroit Athletic Club's Jim Gilhula. Swimming for the State Title in the 440 in 1932, he again finished second with a time of 5:05.5, edged out by only a second behind the leader Gilhula. Jim Gilhula, a challenging competitor, swam for the Detroit Athletic Club and University of Southern California and competed in the 400-meter freestyle at the August 1932 Los Angeles Olympics with Cristy. Cristy was swim team Captain by 1934, his senior year.

== 1931, 1932 NCAA Champions ==
In March 1931, during Cristy's tenure with the team, Michigan swimming won the NCAA championship at Chicago's Lake Shore Athletic Club, defeating Rutgers by six points.

In 1932, as primarily a distance competitor, Cristy helped the Michigan team go 12–1 in meets. That year Michigan won the Big Ten Conference title and the 1932 NCAA Swimming and Diving Championship on individual points. The NCAA meet was held at the University of Michigan, in Ann Arbor though an official team championship had not been established. On March 26, 1932, less than five months before the Los Angeles Olympics, swimming his signature event, the 1500-meter, Cristy placed second at the NCAA Championships. In the lengthy event, he finished only half a lap behind the strong performance of Austin Clapp of Stanford, who had to set an American record time of 20:03.2 to beat Cristy and win the meet.

== AAU and College competition ==
At the National AAU Swimming Championship in the Spring of 1931, Cristy placed second to Buster Crabbe in the 1500-meter distance event, but would continue to improve his times.

At the National AAU Swimming Championship in New York at the New York Athletic Club pool in April 1932, Cristy, a Big 10 Conference champion in the 440-yard, stayed with the leaders in the 500-yard distance swim, but faded to fourth at the finish, with his Michigan team finishing second in the team competition.

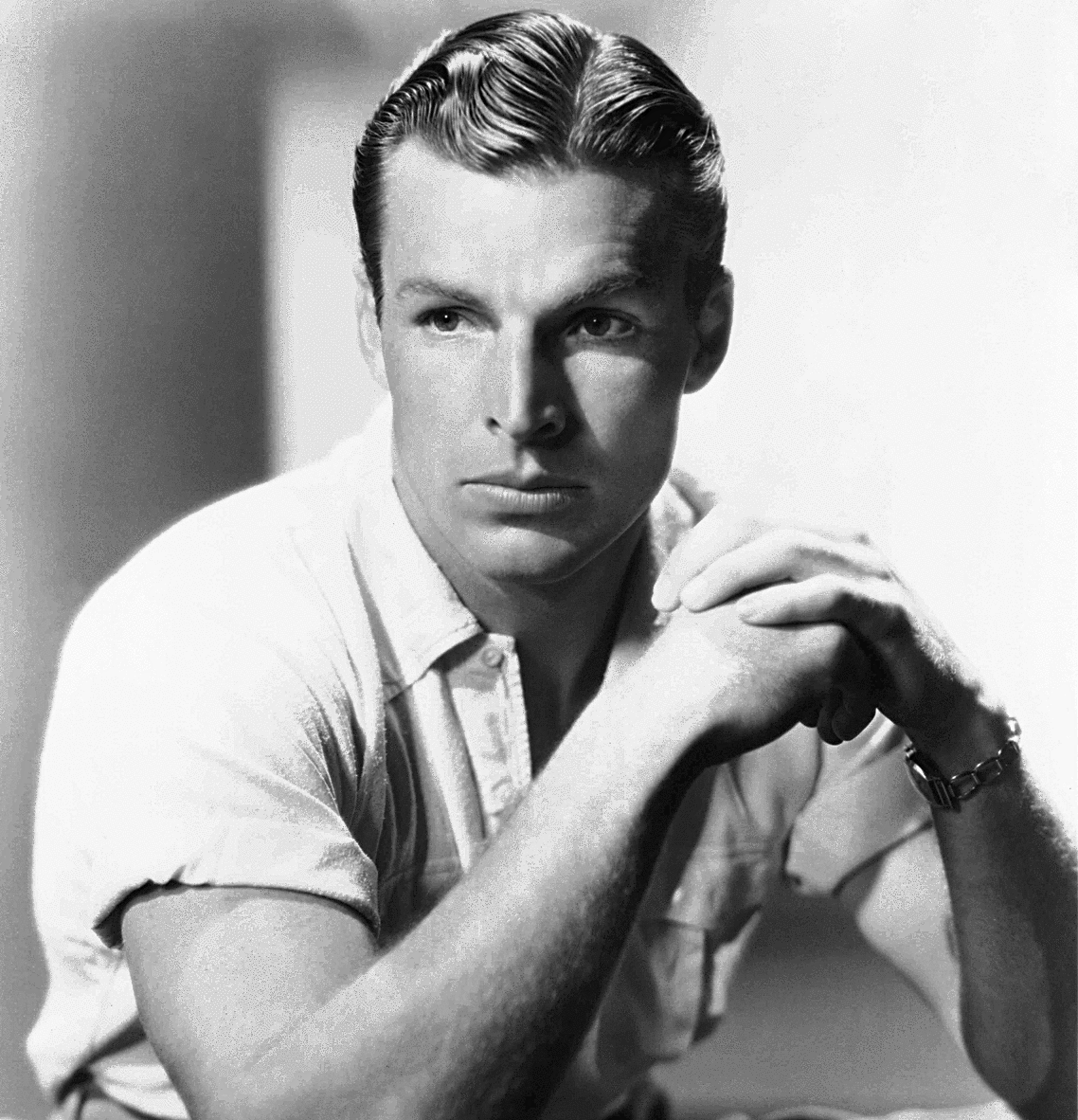
B. Crabbe, 1940s

Continuing to compete against top talent, he lost by eight lengths in the 440-yard freestyle to Buster Crabbe, an L.A. distance star, two-time Olympic medalist, and future actor, in a college meet with the Los Angeles Athletic Club in April 1932. Buster Crabbe, a competitor for Cristy, particularly in the 440-yard event, won the 400-meter freestyle in Olympic record time at the August 1932 Los Angeles Olympics and took the Gold medal, though in a competitive field, he won by only a tenth of a second.

== 1932, L. A. Olympic medal ==
=== 1500-meter trials ===
Swimming in the second heat of the Olympic trials for the 1500-meter event in Los Angeles around August 11, 1932, Cristy placed first winning by 15 meters, though other qualifiers particularly from Japan likely had faster times.

=== 1500-meter 1932 Olympic bronze medal ===
At the age of nineteen, Cristy received a bronze medal for his third-place finish in the men's 1500-meter freestyle, recording a time of 19:39.5 in the event final, 25 seconds behind the second-place finisher Shozo Makino of Japan. Despite placing third, Cristy's time was under the old Olympic record time of 19:51.8 set in the 1928 games. Japanese swimmers dominated the event with new Olympic record times. Kuzuo Kitamuro, the gold medal winner, finished 27 seconds ahead of Cristy, and was not quite 15 years old, making him the youngest male Olympic swimmer to ever take a gold medal.

Buster Crabbe, Cristy's occasional distance event competitor, who had edged him out the prior year at the AAU Championship in the 1500-meter, took fifth in the 1500-meter Olympic event. Journalists attributed his fifth place finish to the fatigue caused by swimming two 1500 and two 400 meter races earlier in the week. Crabbe had previously won the bronze medal for the U.S. team at the 1928 Summer Olympics in Amsterdam.

== 1936 Berlin Olympics, 1500-meter event ==
Cristy placed third swimming the 1500-meter freestyle at the 1936 U.S. Olympic Trials in Warwick Nick, Rhode Island, while representing Chicago's Lake Shore Athletic Club.

He was selected to became part of the U.S. team for the men's 1500-meter freestyle at the 1936 Olympics in Berlin and sailed to Europe. Once in Berlin, he placed fourth in his semi-final heat, within a minute of qualifying for the finals, but was not allowed to participate in the final heat which consisted of only seven swimmers.

== Engagement, marriage ==
While working in Chicago, Cristy was engaged to Barbara Sutherland of Philadelphia in March 1935, while she was a Senior at the University of Michigan. One day after graduating Michigan, Barbara married Jim on June 17, 1935, at his mother's home in Ann Arbor in a small ceremony with family, by a Reverend of the Episcopal Church. Jim's father was deceased, and his brother Harlan was best man. Cristy would remain married to Barbara throughout his life.

== Finance manager, Upjohn Company, 1945 ==
Cristy in 1961

After graduating Michigan in June 1934, Cristy spent ten years in the insurance business in Chicago and Detroit before joining the Upjohn Company, a Michigan-based pharmaceutical manufacturer, around 1945. He served as an elected board member, officer and then Chairman of the Board of Education at the Kellogg Consolidated School System while living in Hickory Corners, a suburb of Kalamazoo. Beginning in 1952, he was a President and active on the board of trustees of Kalamazoo's Senior Citizens Fund and often spoke on the needs of Seniors. In July 1961, he ran as a delegate to the Michigan Constitutional Convention.

== State employee retirement board ==
In 1968, he was first appointed to a board by Michigan Governor Romney to oversee state employee retirement systems, in an attempt to make them more uniform and investigate paying pensions through current revenue. In August 1971, continuing to work in the field of insurance, investment and banking, Cristy was re-appointed by Michigan Governor William Millikin to serve on the board. In April 1974, Cristy and his wife Barbara acted as a developer and proprietor for a property in Michigan on Gull Lake, near Kalamazoo, known as Marshfield.

As a fitting legacy, the Jim Cristy Swimming Scholarship was created as part of the Kalamazoo Community Foundation to give financial aid to students who wish to participate in Kalamazoo County competitive swimming or in programs created to learn swimming, but who require financial aid for this purpose.

Cristy died at home on June 7, 1989 in Kalamazoo, Michigan, and was survived by his wife, two sons and two daughters. He was buried at Kalamazoo's Mount Ever-Rest Memorial Park South, as would later be his wife Barbara Sutherland. A memorial service was held at Stetson Chapel at Kalamazoo College on June 19. Jim was active in the arts, and accepted donations to the Kalamazoo Fontana Society, a supporter of the local music community.

== See also ==
- List of Olympic medalists in swimming (men)
- List of University of Michigan alumni
