= Miguel Maria de Serpa Lopes =

Brazilian judge and academic (1898–1961)

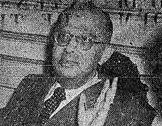

President of the Court of Justice of the Federal District, Brazil
- In office 1955–1956

Personal details
- Born: 3 August 1898 Maceió, Alagoas, Brazil
- Died: 11 May 1961 (aged 62) Rio de Janeiro
- Education: Federal University of Pernambuco; Federal University of Rio de Janeiro
- Profession: Judge; academic
- Known for: Treatise of Public Records (4 volumes); Course on Civil Law (9 volumes)

Miguel Maria de Serpa Lopes (1898 —1961) was a Brazilian jurist, university professor, and appellate court judge, known for his work on civil law. He was president of the Regional Electoral Court of the Federal District and the Court of Justice of the Federal District, at the time when Rio de Janeiro was the Federal capital of Brazil. His legal decisions and publications are still widely cited.

== Early life and education ==
Serpa Lopes was born in Maceió, the capital of Brazil's Alagoas state, on 3 August 1898. He was the son of Commander Firmo da Cunha Lopes and of Júlia Serpa. He studied law at the Federal University of Pernambuco Recife School of Law (FDR-UFPE), obtaining a bachelor's degree in 1920, with distinction in all subjects. Between 1932 and 1937 he worked on a doctorate of law at what is now the Federal University of Rio de Janeiro Faculty of Law (UFRJ), known as the National Law School, presenting a thesis entitled Silence as a Manifestation of Will. He had strong Catholic faith and was knowledgeable about Canon Law and ecclesiastical matters. He obtained a Habilitation degree in civil law in 1956 from the Law School of Niterói, with the thesis The Emphyteusis: Its Legal Nature and Its Future. He married Hilda Duarte, with whom he had five children, only two of whom survived to adulthood, their sons Luiz and Firmo.

== Legal career ==
In 1921, Serpa Lopes was appointed as second alternate to the substitute federal judge installed in Maceió. In 1923, he was appointed deputy to the 1st Public Prosecutor's Office of the state of Alagoas. Moving to Rio de Janeiro, he initially worked as a lawyer in the Federal District before entering the judiciary in 1930. He occupied the 4th and 1st Criminal Presidency from 1931 and the 3rd Civil Presidency from 1936. He was a judge of the 8th Criminal Court in 1938. In 1939, he became the head of the Public Records Court of the Federal District, a position he had previously held temporarily, where he played a prominent role, resulting in the publication of his work Tratado dos Registros Públicos (Treatise on Public Records - 1938), which became required reading in the area of Brazilian public records, and has been recognized as a reference since 1948 by the Supreme Federal Court.

Serpa Lopes became a Justice of the Court of Justice of the Federal District in 1946. In 1954, he served as president of the Regional Electoral Court of the Federal District. In 1954, he was elected as president of the Court of Justice, a position he held for two years, being sworn in on 4 January 1955. In 1960, with the extinction of the Federal District in Rio de Janeiro and the transfer of the capital of Brazil to Brasília, he became a Judge of the Court of Justice of the State of Guanabara, the successor to the Rio de Janeiro Federal District, where he remained until his death.

== Academic career ==
Serpa Lopes also served as a professor of civil law at the Pontifical Catholic University of Rio de Janeiro, at the Law School of Fluminense Federal University, at the Universidade Gama Filho (UGF) and at Universidade Candido Mendes (UCAM), the oldest private university in Latin America. Even while in poor health in his final years, he continued to teach classes. His six-volume manual Course on Civil Law continues to be used.

== Other Activities ==
Serpa Lopes was a member of the Joint Committee of lawyers, judges and members of the Public Prosecutor's Office that presented a draft revision of the Civil Procedure Code on April 18, 1950. He was a founder of the Grotius Institute of Legal Studies at UFRJ in 1945.

== Awards and honours ==
His portrait was installed in the Court of Justice of the Federal District (Rio de Janeiro) in 1951 and in the gallery of former presidents of the Court of Justice in 1958. On 12 June 2024 a discussion on The Life and Work of Miguel Maria de Serpa Lopes was held by the Permanent Forum of Civil Courts at the Magistrates School of the state of Rio de Janeiro (EMERJ), in conjunction with the Centre for Studies and Debates (CEDES).

== Controversies ==
On April 12, 1946, as a judge of the Public Registry Court he decided that the registration of the communist inter-union association Movimento Unificador dos Trabalhadores (MUT) was illegal, on the grounds that the Marxist and revolutionary objectives of the association were contrary to public order.

In 1956, as President of the Federal District Court of Justice, he publicly protested, on behalf of the Court, for having been deliberately excluded from the inauguration banquet of President Juscelino Kubitschek.

== Publications ==
In his later years he published his works through the bookstore and publisher Freitas Bastos, in Rio de Janeiro, with which he maintained a faithful relationship until the end of his life. His publications are still widely quoted:

- Silence as a Manifestation of Will in Obligations, 1st ed., Rio de Janeiro: A. Coelho Branco, 1935.
- Theoretical and Practical Commentary on the Introductory Law to the Civil Code, Rio de Janeiro: Jacintho Editora, 1943-1946 (3 volumes).
- Treatise on Public Records, 1st ed., Rio de Janeiro, Jacintho Editora, 1938 (4 volumes)
- Course on Civil Law, Rio de Janeiro: Freitas Bastos, 1955 (six volumes: the work was later completed by José Serpa de Santa Maria, with the entire course consisting of nine volumes)
- Lease Agreement, Rio de Janeiro: Freitas Bastos, 1956.
- Leasehold: Its Legal Nature and Its Future, Rio de Janeiro: Freitas Bastos, 1957.
- Substantial Exceptions: Exception of Unfulfilled Contract, Rio de Janeiro: Freitas Bastos, 1959.

He also published articles in the newspaper, Jornal do Commercio, and in the Revista de Direito Imobiliário and other journals.

== Death ==
Serpa Lopes died in Rio de Janeiro on 11 May 1961.

His death was widely mourned, including by his students at the Law School of Fluminense Federal University, who wrote to the Diario de Noticias to express their appreciation for his teaching. A street was later named after him in the Casa Verde district of São Paulo.
