= Sunao Ishiharada =

Japanese swimmer

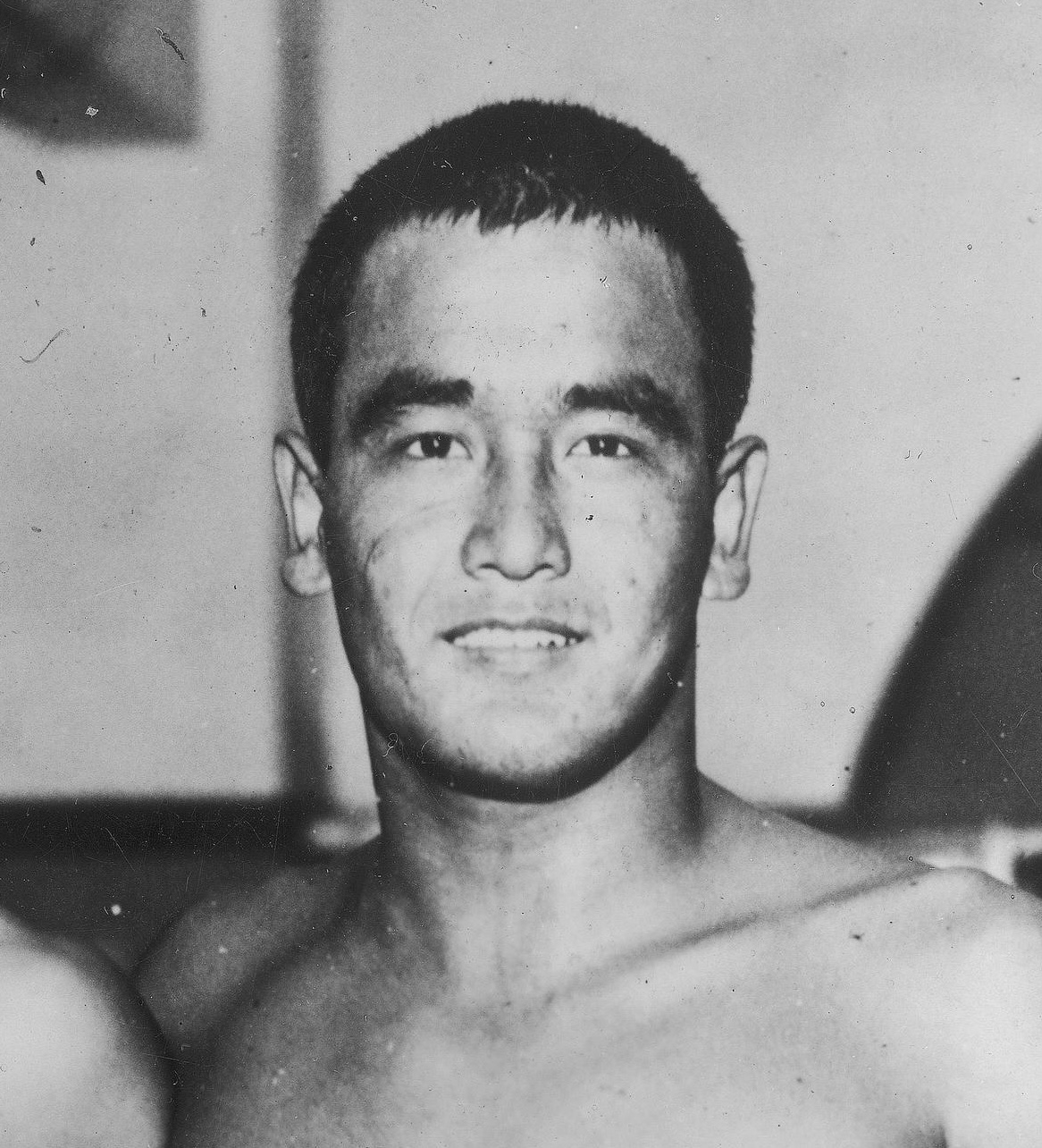

Personal information
- Nationality: Japanese
- Born: March 24, 1915 Kagoshima Prefecture, Japan
- Died: 1987 (aged 71–72)

Sport
- Sport: Swimming

Sunao Ishiharada (石原田 愿, Ishiharada Sunao; March 24, 1915 – 1987) was a Japanese freestyle swimmer who competed in the 1932 Summer Olympics and in the 1936 Summer Olympics. He was born in Kagoshima Prefecture. In 1932 he was eliminated in the semi-finals of the 1500 metre freestyle event. Four years later he finished fourth in the 1500 metre freestyle competition.
