= William Pearson (swimmer) =

English swimmer

Personal information
- Born: 10 December 1916
- Died: 29 February 2004 (aged 87) Doncaster, England

Sport
- Sport: Swimming

William Pearson (10 December 1916 – 29 February 2004) was a British swimmer. He competed in the men's 400 metre freestyle at the 1936 Summer Olympics.
