= João Havelange =

Brazilian businessman, athlete and football administrator (1916–2016)

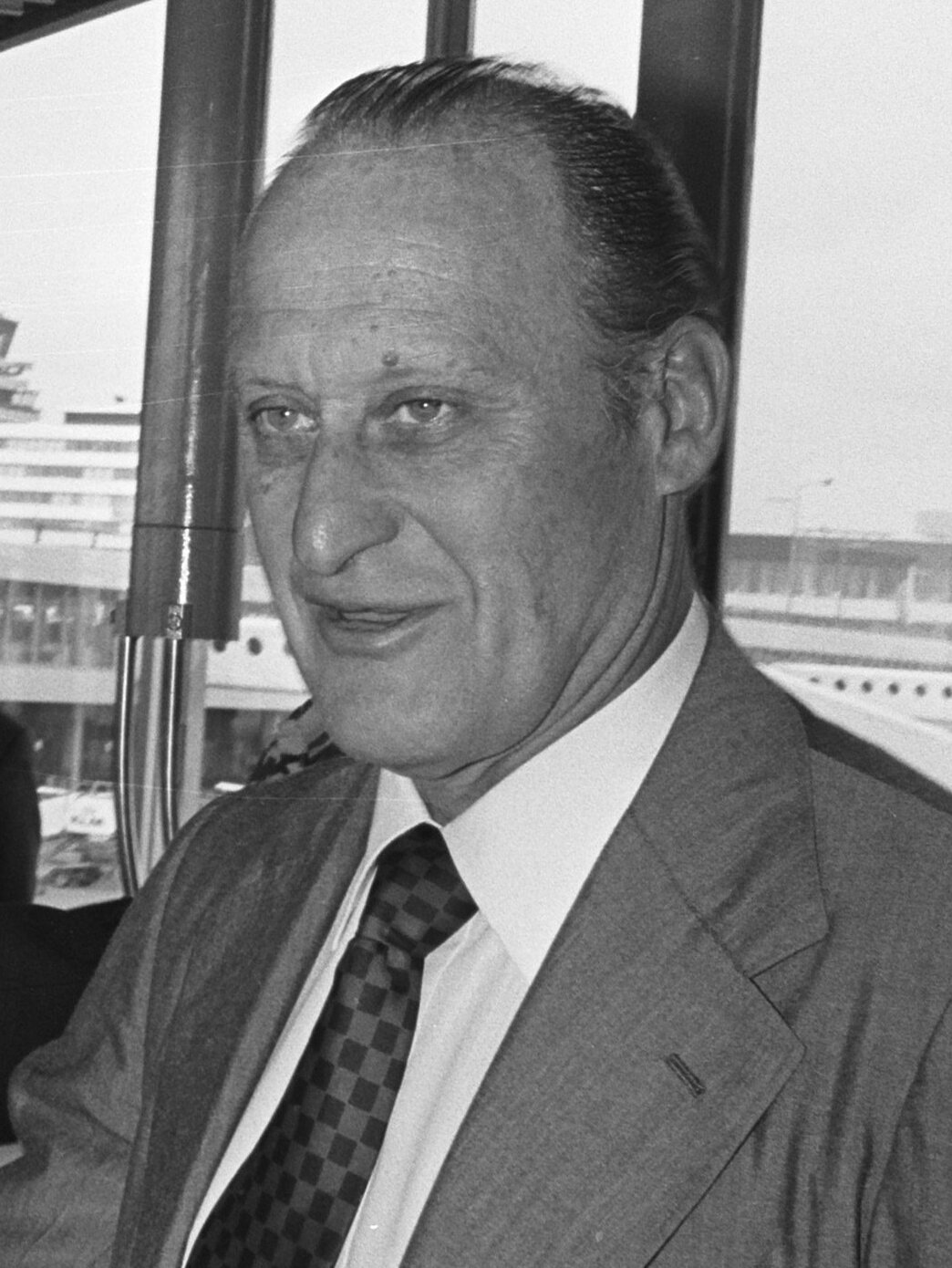
- Havelange in 1975

7th President of FIFA
- In office 8 May 1974 – 8 June 1998
- Preceded by: Stanley Rous
- Succeeded by: Sepp Blatter

President of CBD
- In office 11 January 1958 – 10 January 1975
- Preceded by: Sylvio Corrêa Pacheco
- Succeeded by: Heleno de Barros Nunes

Personal details
- Born: Jean-Marie Faustin Godefroid de Havelange; 8 May 1916 Rio de Janeiro, Brazil
- Died: 16 August 2016 (aged 100) Rio de Janeiro, Brazil
- Resting place: Cemitério São João Batista, Rio de Janeiro
- Education: Fluminense Federal University
- Occupation: Lawyer

João Havelange
Medal record

Men's Water polo

Pan American Games
Silver medal – second place	1951 Buenos Aires	Team

Jean-Marie Faustin Godefroid "João" de Havelange (Brazilian Portuguese: [ʒuˈɐ̃w aviˈlɐ̃ʒi], French: [ʒɑ̃ maʁi fostɛ̃ ɡɔdfʁwa də avlɑ̃ʒ]; 8 May 1916 – 16 August 2016) was a Brazilian lawyer, businessman, and athlete who was the seventh president of FIFA from 1974 to 1998. His tenure as president is the second longest in FIFA's history, behind that of Jules Rimet. He received the title of honorary president when leaving office, but resigned in April 2013. He was preceded by Stanley Rous and succeeded by Sepp Blatter. Havelange served as a member of the International Olympic Committee (IOC) from 1963 to 2011. He was the longest-serving active member upon his resignation. In July 2012, a Swiss prosecutor's report revealed that, during his tenure on FIFA's Executive Committee, he and his son-in-law Ricardo Teixeira took more than 41 million Swiss francs (£37M) in bribes in connection with the award of World Cup marketing rights.

== Early life, professional and Olympic career ==
Havelange was born on 8 May 1916, in Rio de Janeiro, to an affluent family coming from Belgium; his father, Faustin Havelange, had immigrated to Brazil from Liège, Belgium, worked as an arms dealer, and owned a large estate that stretched along the present-day districts of Laranjeiras, Cosme Velho and Santa Teresa. An excellent student at school, Havelange was accepted to the prestigious Law School of Fluminense Federal University, from which he graduated at the age of 24 with a BA in law. He worked as a legal advisor for bus company Auto Viação Jabaquara, and became president-director of another bus company, Viação Cometa S/A. He was also senior partner at chemical and metallurgical company Orwec Química e Metallurgia Ltda.

Interested in sports since his childhood years, at the age of 20 Havelange competed as a swimmer at the 1936 Summer Olympics in Berlin, but failed to go beyond the heats of the 400m freestyle and 1500m freestyle events. He was also part of the Brazilian team that tied for 13th in water polo at the 1952 Summer Olympics in Helsinki. He was the chef de mission of the Brazilian delegation at the 1956 Summer Olympic Games in Melbourne.

== Sports administrator ==
As president of the Metropolitan Swimming Federation in Brazil, Havelange became a member of the Brazilian Olympic Committee and joined the Union Cycliste Internationale in 1958. After becoming vice-president of the Brazilian Sports Confederation, he was president of the Confederation from 1958 to 1973.

== President of FIFA (1974–1998) ==
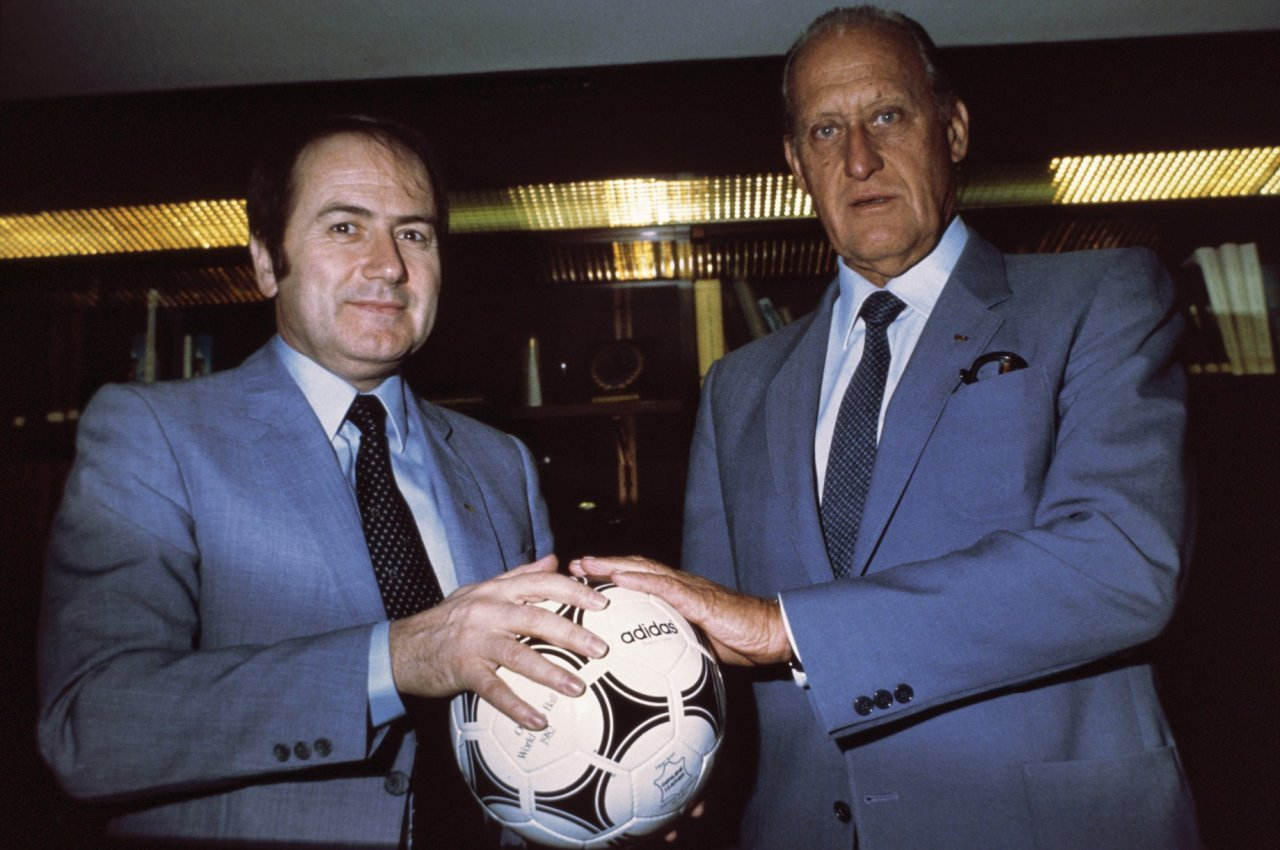
Havelange with Sepp Blatter in 1982

In 1974, Havelange defeated Englishman Stanley Rous for the presidency of FIFA, the governing body of world association football. Havelange became the first (and, to date, only) non-European to hold the post. He lobbied in 86 different countries for the presidency, often accompanied by Pelé. Sports marketer Patrick Nally said that "Havelange had seen the future...he knew that if he became the president of the only federation already running its own high-profile world championship then he would enjoy huge economic power". Appealing to developing nations, Havelange promised an expanded World Cup, and a youth World Cup that they might be able to host.

Threatened by Havelange's international campaign for the presidency, Rous asked Horst Dassler, then managing Adidas' French subsidiary to help his campaign. Dassler engaged in intense lobbying of the delegates at the 39th FIFA Congress, where the vote was to be held. The election went to a second round, and Havelange won by sixteen votes.

Havelange did not have sufficient money to fund his programme for FIFA, so he sought financial support from Dassler, who wished to supply Adidas branded equipment to the national federations. Supported by sports marketer Patrick Nally, Havelange enlisted Adidas and Coca-Cola as primary sponsors of FIFA tournaments.

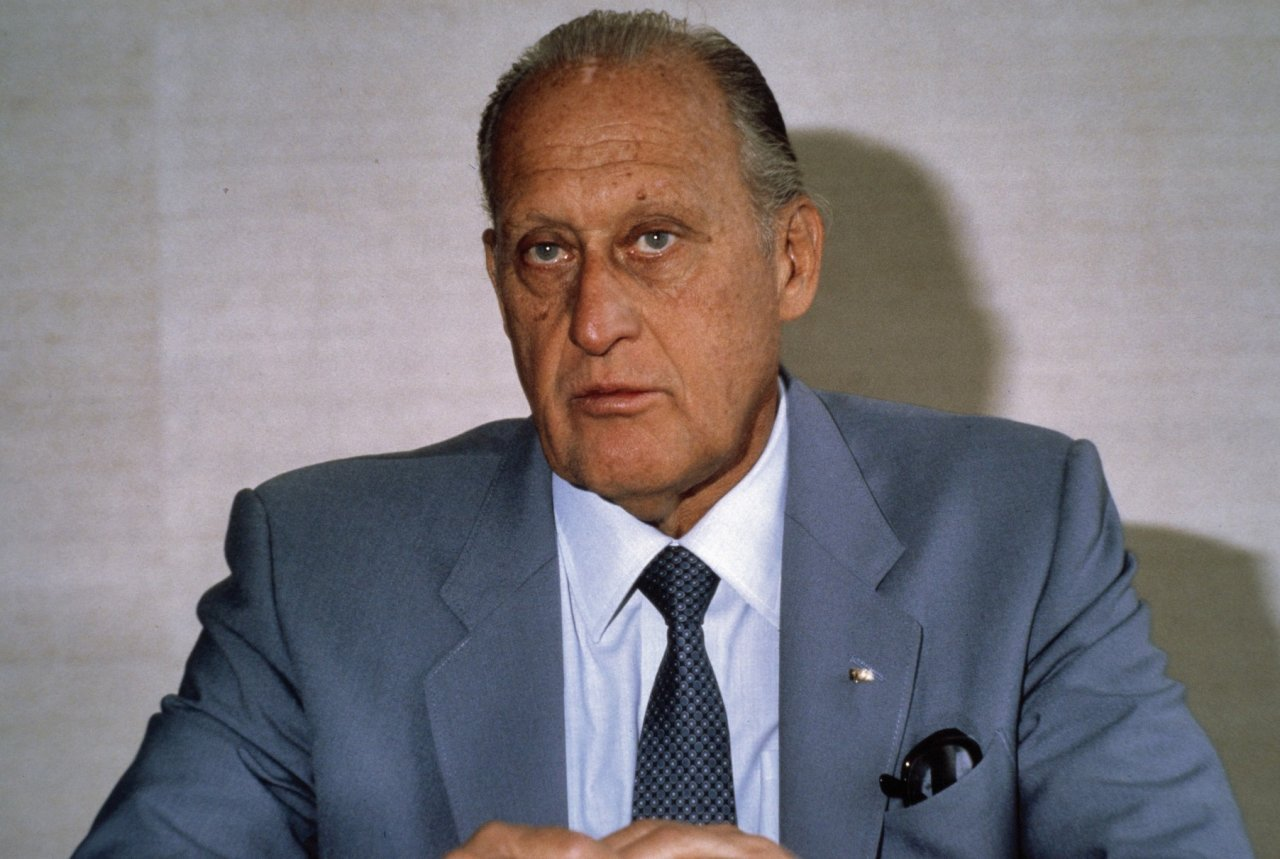
Havelange in 1982, during his presidency of FIFA

The support of commercial organizations was crucial to the future of Havelange and FIFA, and provided a model for global sporting federations. Nally stated that:

"The money we brought into FIFA through Coke was clearly changing the face of the federation. Havelange was building a new international headquarters in Zurich, appointing professional full-time staff and PR and finance people. FIFA was showing the way. Other federations were watching closely. Many others were eager to follow and quick to fall into the hands of Horst and myself"

The sale of television rights increased greatly under Havelange's leadership. In 1987 the European rights to the next three FIFA World Cups were sold for $440 million, the non-United States rights for the three tournaments from 1998 sold for $2.2 billion. Under Havelange's presidency the FIFA World Cup expanded from 16 to 32 teams, with Havelange overseeing six world cups during his time in office. The FIFA U-17 World Cup, FIFA U-20 World Cup, FIFA Confederations Cup and FIFA Women's World Cup were all introduced under his tenure.

=== Links with Carlos Lacoste and Castor de Andrade ===
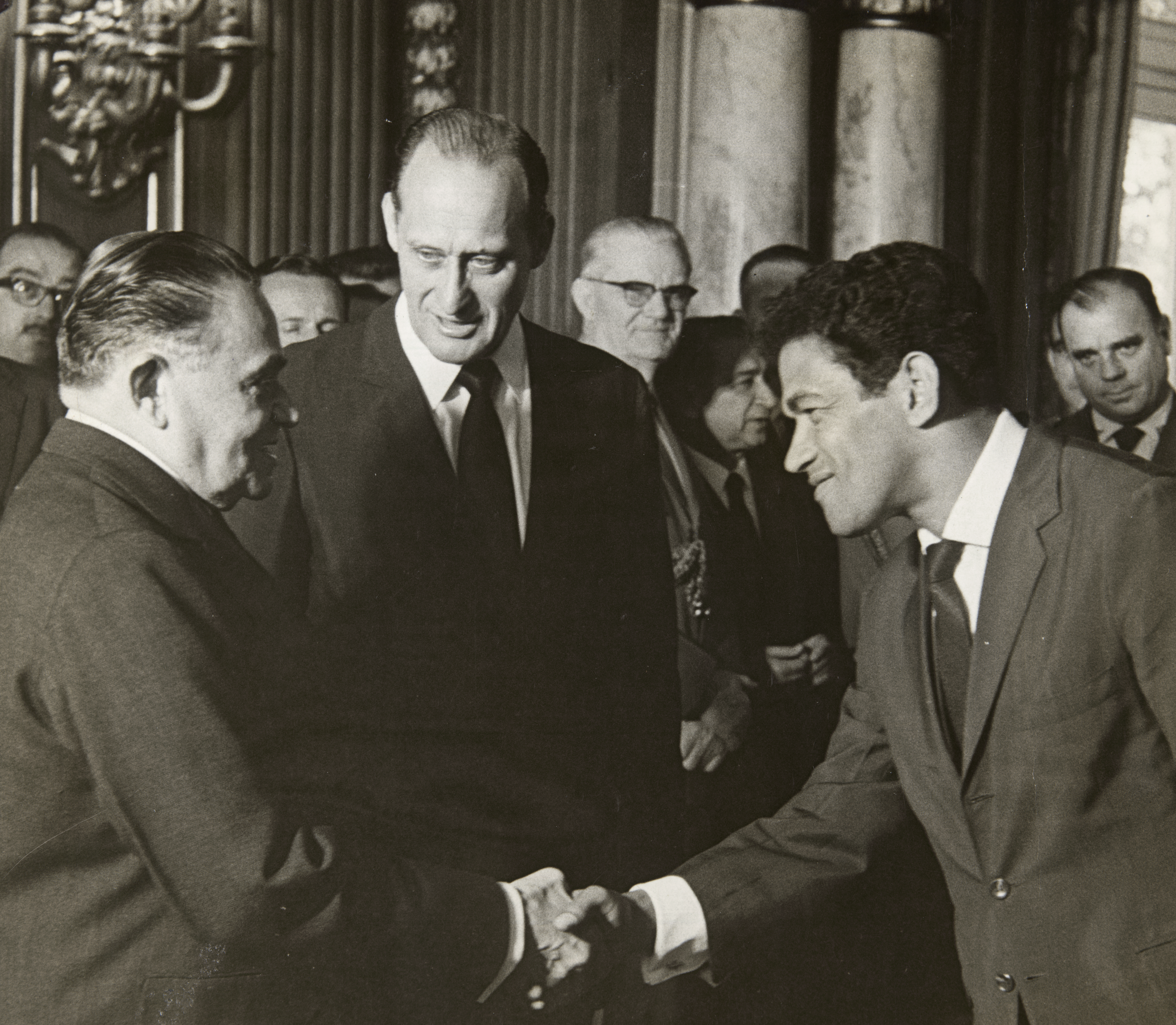
João Havelange with Brazilian president Humberto de Alencar Castelo Branco and Garrincha in 1966.

The head of the Argentina's 1978 FIFA World Cup organizing committee, Omar Actis, was assassinated in August 1976. FIFA chose Argentina to host the 1978 FIFA World Cup on 6 July 1966, during a meeting in London, England—a full decade before the military coup of 1976. Argentina did little to prepare for the event before the 1976 Argentine coup d'état that saw a military junta rule the country. In 1982 Carlos Lacoste, former de facto president of Argentina during the junta, became vice-president of FIFA. Lacoste had previously been head of the organising committee for the 1978 World Cup in Argentina and was cousin of former de facto president Jorge Rafael Videla. Democratic rule was restored to Argentina in 1983 and Lacoste was investigated for corruption.

Havelange was also an associate of Brazilian criminal Castor de Andrade, head of an illegal jogo do bicho operation. Andrade was sentenced to six years in prison in 1994 for racketeering. Havelange wrote a character reference for Andrade in 1987 as "amiable and pleasant ... predominant feature .. loyalty .. good family man, a devoted friend, and is admired as a sports administrator". "I authorize Castor de Andrade to use this statement as he deems appropriate". Police investigating Andrade found this reference and evidence that Andrade had provided Havelange with a box at the Rio Carnival.

=== Association with Pelé and Ricardo Teixeira ===
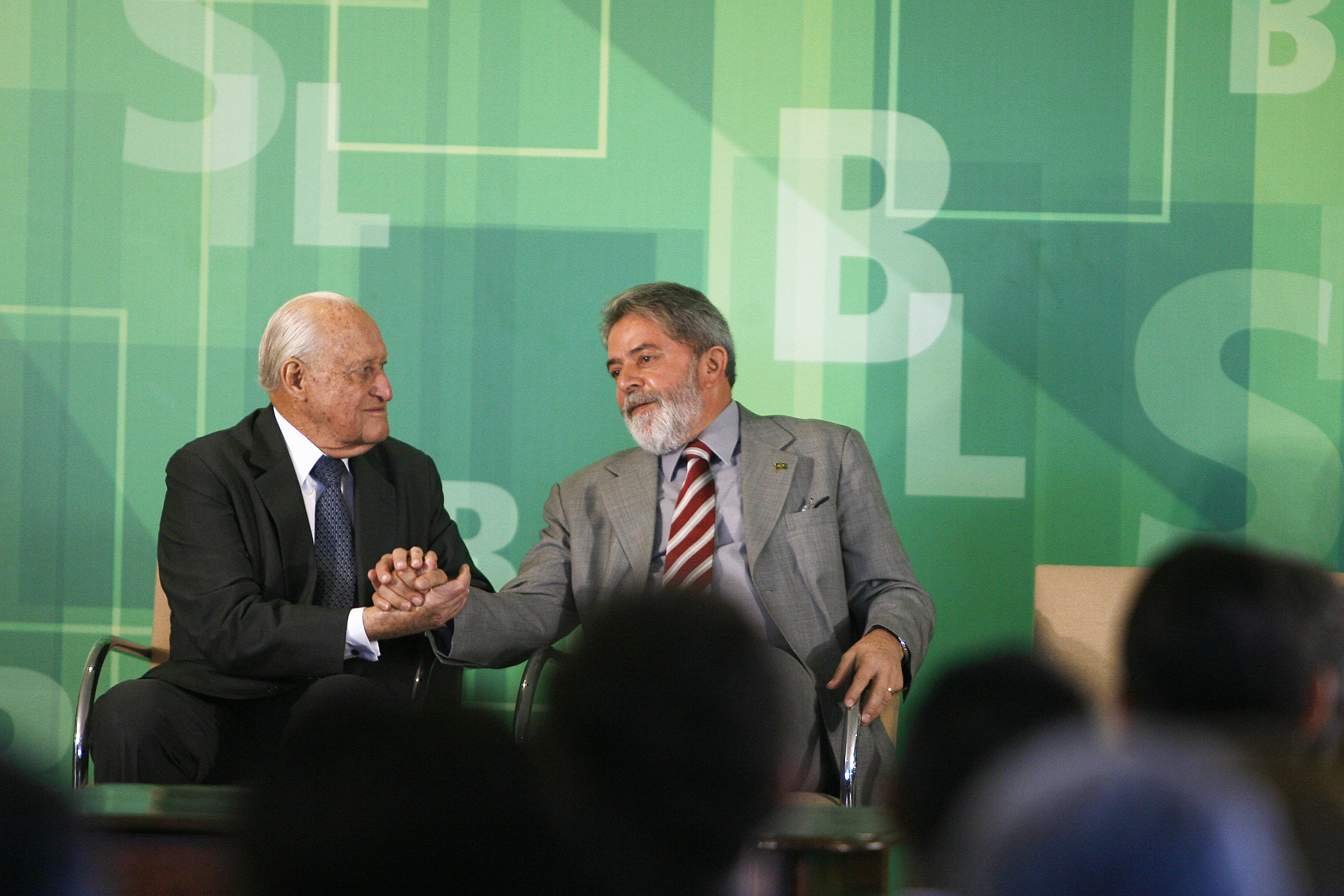
Havelange with Brazilian president Luiz Inácio Lula da Silva (June 15, 2007).

Havelange's daughter, Lucia, was married to the Brazilian football administrator Ricardo Teixeira for 30 years. They divorced in 1997. Teixeira was President of the Brazilian Football Confederation (CBF) between 1989 and 2012. A financier, Teixeira had no previous experience of sports administration.

In 1993, angry when his television company was rejected in a contest for domestic rights, Brazilian footballer Pelé accused Teixeira of corruption, resulting in an eight-year feud between Pelé and Havelange. Consequently, Havelange banned Pelé from the draw for the 1994 FIFA World Cup in Las Vegas. Criticisms over the ban were perceived to have negatively affected Havelange's chances of re-election as FIFA President in 1994. As in 1974, Havelange embarked on an intense lobbying mission, with the aim of securing votes from the Confederation of African Football (CAF), Asian Football Confederation (AFC) and the North American, Central American and Caribbean Football Confederation (CONCACAF). The loyalty of these "third world" football federations was rewarded by the expansion of the World Cup from 24 to 32 teams for the 1998 FIFA World Cup. As a result of the expansion and allocation of places, tension grew between the governing body of European football (UEFA) and the FIFA leadership.

As Brazilian Minister for Sports, Pelé drafted legislation approved as the Pelé law in December 1997 by the lower house of the Brazilian congress. Football clubs had to become companies within two years, giving players greater freedom of contract and limiting the power of the Brazilian Football Confederation. Havelange threatened to ban Brazil from the 1998 World Cup if the law passed.

=== FIFA Presidential elections ===
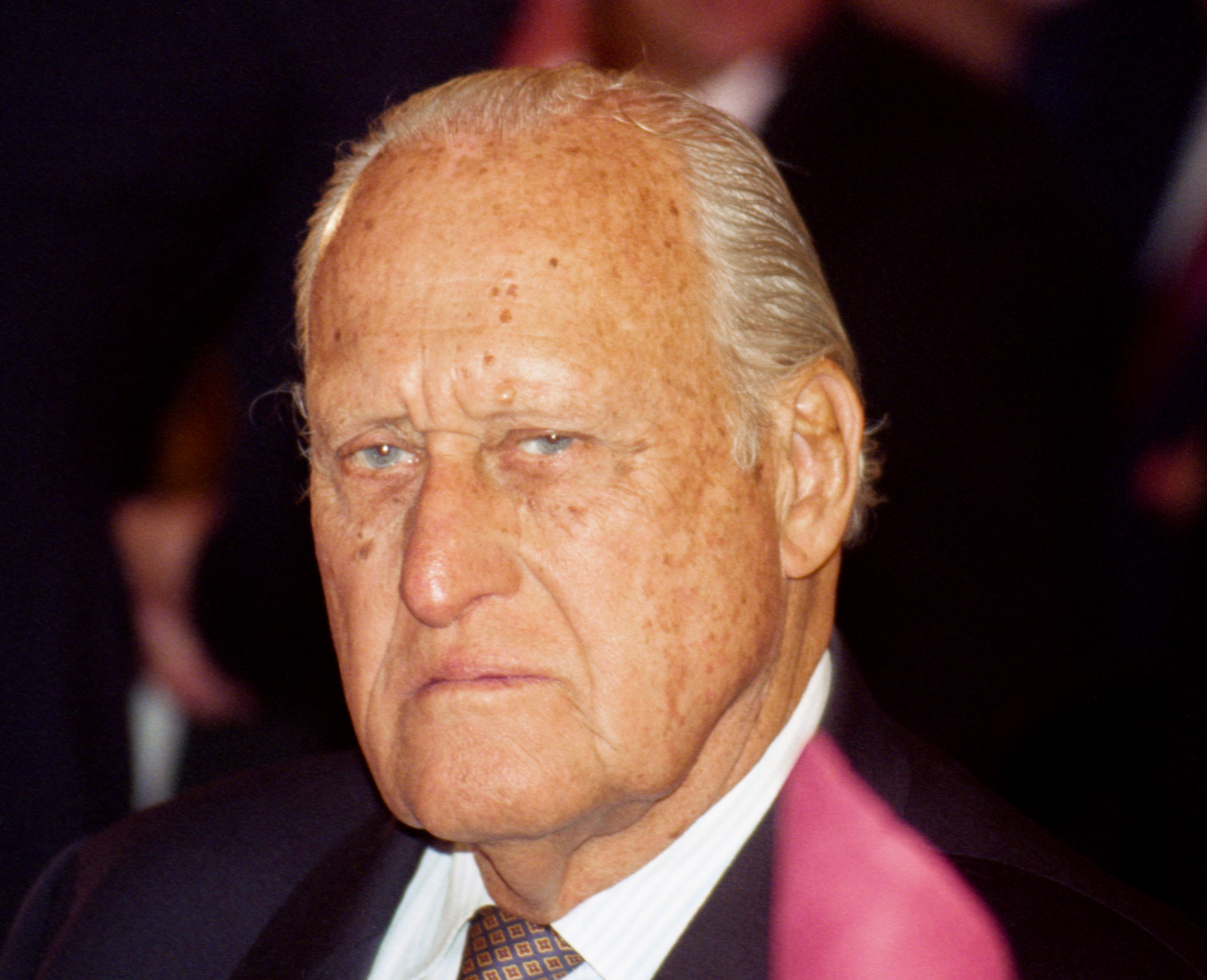
João Havelange in 1997.

At the 1994 meeting of the FIFA Executive Committee in New York, Havelange was criticized for his allocation of appointments to FIFA's standing committees. Havelange postponed a discussion on the appointments, distributed a list with the new composition of the committees, and declared the list passed without a vote. In 1998 Havelange announced that he would stand down as FIFA president after 24 years in charge. He told British Prime Minister Tony Blair he wanted England to host the 2006 FIFA World Cup. The English Football Association had pledged support to Lennart Johansson in the forthcoming FIFA Presidential election, whereas Havelange supported FIFA General Secretary Sepp Blatter. Johansson was in favour of honouring a "gentleman's agreement" between the English and German football associations, that Germany would not oppose England's bid for the 1996 European Football Championship, and England would not oppose Germany's bid for the 2006 World Cup.

Johansson said "The dumbest thing about breaking the agreement is that we're faced with an expensive competition. We would be better off spending the money on real soccer." Johansson criticized Havelange's financial decisions and "undemocratic behaviour". At a meeting of the FIFA Executive Committee, Johansson demanded Sepp Blatter resign as FIFA General Secretary if he planned to run for the presidency of FIFA. Havelange rejected the demand and ended the meeting before a vote could be taken, described as "a defeat for democracy" by Johansson. If elected, Johansson planned that an independent accountant would examine FIFA's business practices under Havelange. Blatter was elected by 111 to 80 votes, amid claims of bribery.

== Corruption ==
In 1999, De Telegraaf reported that Havelange accepted gifts of diamonds, bicycles, sports articles, Delft blue porcelain, paintings and art books, in connection with Amsterdam's failed bid for the 1992 Summer Olympic Games. "I remember it very well because he had special wishes, wishes which were in conflict with the IOC laws," said Peter Kronenberg, who headed the press office of the Amsterdam Olympic Games 1992 Foundation.

=== Collapse of ISL ===
Disagreements between Patrick Nally and Horst Dassler led to the foundation of International Sport and Leisure (ISL) in 1982. Dassler, French businessman André Guelfi, and Japanese advertising firm Dentsu established ISL to help market the rights for the 1986 FIFA World Cup in Mexico. Dassler's proximity to Havelange, and his support for Juan Antonio Samaranch, the President of the International Olympic Committee (IOC) enabled ISL to win lucrative future World Cup and Olympic contracts. Following Dassler's death in 1987, and the departure of key executives, ISL overpaid for sports rights in the 1990s, and was declared bankrupt in 2001. From 1989 to 2001, ISL paid 185 million Swiss francs (CHF) in "personal commissions" to sports officials and other people involved in the marketing of sports rights. In the 2008 fraud trial that arose from the collapse of ISL, a judge referred to the commissions as "schmiergeld", a German word for bribery.

In May 2006, British investigative reporter Andrew Jennings' book Foul! The Secret World of FIFA: Bribes, Vote-Rigging and Ticket Scandals implicated Havelange in the collapse of ISL, and revealed that some football officials were urged to secretly repay the commissions they received. In 2011, Jennings told Brazil's Senate that Havelange may have amassed $50 million or more in bribes through a front company called Sicuretta.

An IOC ethics committee was announced in June 2011 to investigate claims that Havelange received a bribe of $1 million in connection with ISL. The investigation was prompted by Jennings' claims in FIFA's Shame, an episode of Panorama broadcast on BBC One in May 2011. Days before the ethics committee was set to happen, Havelange resigned as a member of the IOC, citing health concerns. The investigation was closed, with reports that it would have suspended the membership of Havelange for two years. In November 2011 Jennings accused Havelange of being one of the people who collectively paid 5.5 million CHF to close the 2008 ISL fraud trial.

In July 2012, after protracted court proceedings, Havelange and Teixeira were named as beneficiaries of bribes from ISL. A prosecutor in the canton of Zug revealed a document saying that, from 1992 to 2000, Havelange and Teixeira were paid 41m CHF by ISL. Teixeira had resigned from FIFA in March 2012. In 2012 Sepp Blatter said that at the time of this payment, commercial bribery was not a crime in Switzerland. In 1997, as President of FIFA, Havelange had granted ISL FIFA's exclusive marketing rights, and exclusive TV and radio rights to the 2002 and 2006 World Cups in 1998. ISL paid FIFA 200m CHF for the marketing rights and $1.4 billion for the TV rights. After ISL's bankruptcy, its liquidators examined all payments made by the company.

=== FIFA involvement ===
FIFA, under the presidency of Sepp Blatter, was found to have known about the bribes, yet argued it did not need to have the money repaid. Prosecutions were mounted for alleged embezzlement against Havelange and Teixeira, but were stopped in May 2010, after Havelange and Texeira repaid CHF500,000 and CHF2.5m respectively. The repayments were considered reasonable, because bribes paid before 1995 were outside the statute of limitations and Havelange was now over 90 years old. The prosecutor also believed that Havelange and Teixeira were guilty of criminal breaches of their duties to serve FIFA as senior executives. Following the release of the report, Blatter vowed to strip Havelange of his honorary presidency at the next FIFA Congress.

== Health issues and death ==
In March and April 2012, Havelange was hospitalized for a seriously infected right ankle in Rio de Janeiro, which necessitated a period in intensive care. In April 2013 he resigned from his position as FIFA's Honorary President for "health and personal reasons". Havelange was again admitted to hospital in June 2014, for a lung infection, and in November 2015 with respiratory problems. He died at 5:00 BRT on 16 August 2016 at the age of 100 in Rio de Janeiro during the 2016 Summer Olympics which were being held there.

== Legacy and assessment ==
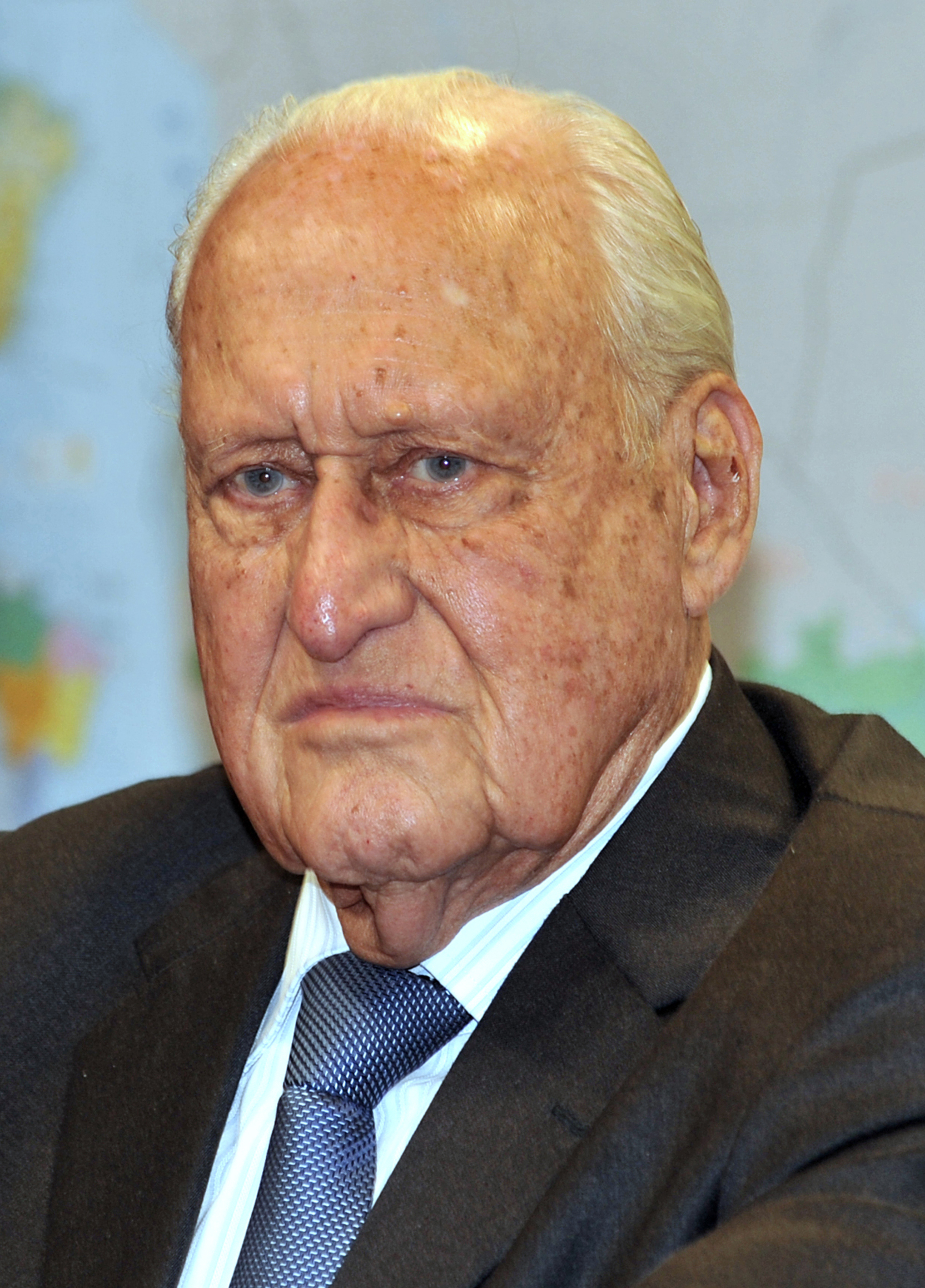
Havelange in 2010

Writing in June 1998, as Havelange was leaving FIFA, and before the eruption of most of the controversies surrounding him, The New York Times commented on Havelange's leadership:

"[Havelange] ran FIFA, as the world soccer federation is known, with a combination of autocratic rigidity and progressive reform. In 24 years as FIFA's president, Havelange was credited with building the Zurich-based organization from a fledgling operation in a private residence to a worldwide force that oversees a $250 billion-a-year international industry. With Blatter working by his side for 17 years and implementing his programs as FIFA's general secretary, Havelange increased the size of the World Cup from 16 to 32 teams, introduced a World Cup for women, gained a place for women's soccer in the Summer Olympics and built up marketing and television rights fees to the point that each of FIFA's 204 national federations will receive $1 million from the 1998 World Cup."

— The New York Times,

== Honors ==
Havelange was elected honorary president of FIFA in 1998, but resigned in 2013. On August 24, 2006, Havelange was named honorary Vice President of the Brazilian Ice Sports Federation (CBDG) for his support in the development of winter sports in Brazil.

=== Awards ===
- Austria: Grand Decoration of Honour in Silver with Star of the Decoration of Honour for Services to the Republic of Austria (2003)
- Brazil: Grand Cross of the Order of Rio Branco (2007)
- France: Grand Officer of the Légion d'honneur (1998)
- Italy: Grand Cross of the Order of Merit of the Italian Republic (1984)
- Morocco: Grand Cross of the Order of Ouissam Alaouite
- Portugal: Grand Cross of the Order of Merit (Portugal) (1991)
- Portugal: Grand Officer of the Order of Public Instruction (1963)
- Portugal: Commander of the Order of Infante D. Henrique (1960)
- Spain: Grand Cross of the Order of Isabella the Catholic (1982)
- Sweden: Knight 1st Class of the Order of Vasa

=== Distinctions ===
- Medal of the UEFA Order of Merit.
- FIFA Honorary Medal.
- Honorary Doctor of the University of Porto.

=== Eponyms ===
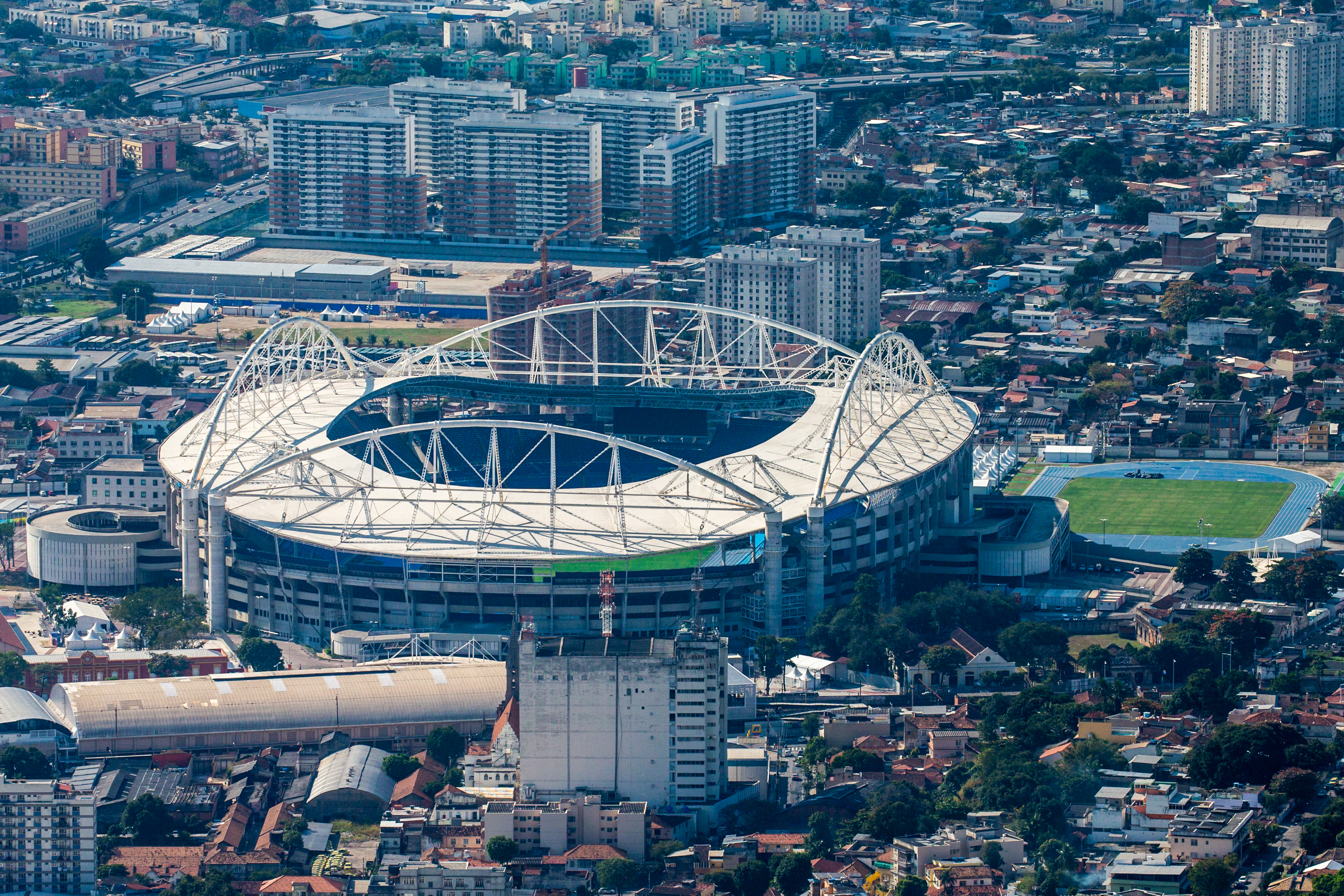
Aerial view of the Estádio Olímpico Nilton Santos, formerly named after Havelange

The following have been named after Havelange in his honor for his important contributions.

- The 2000 Brazilian Championship, won by Vasco da Gama, and organized by Clube dos 13 (an association of the Brazilian most traditional clubs), was called Copa João Havelange.
- A stadium built for the 2007 Pan American Games was named Estádio Olímpico João Havelange. The stadium hosted the athletics competitions at the 2016 Summer Olympics and the 2016 Summer Paralympics. On 10 February 2017, the stadium was renamed Estádio Olímpico Nilton Santos.
- The Estádio Parque do Sabiá's former name
- Trinidad's Dr. João Havelange Centre of Excellence

== Publication ==
- O Dirigente Esportivo Do Seculo XX, Rio de Janeiro, ed. Casa Da Palavra, 2015.
