= Shunpei Uto =

Japanese swimmer (born 1918)

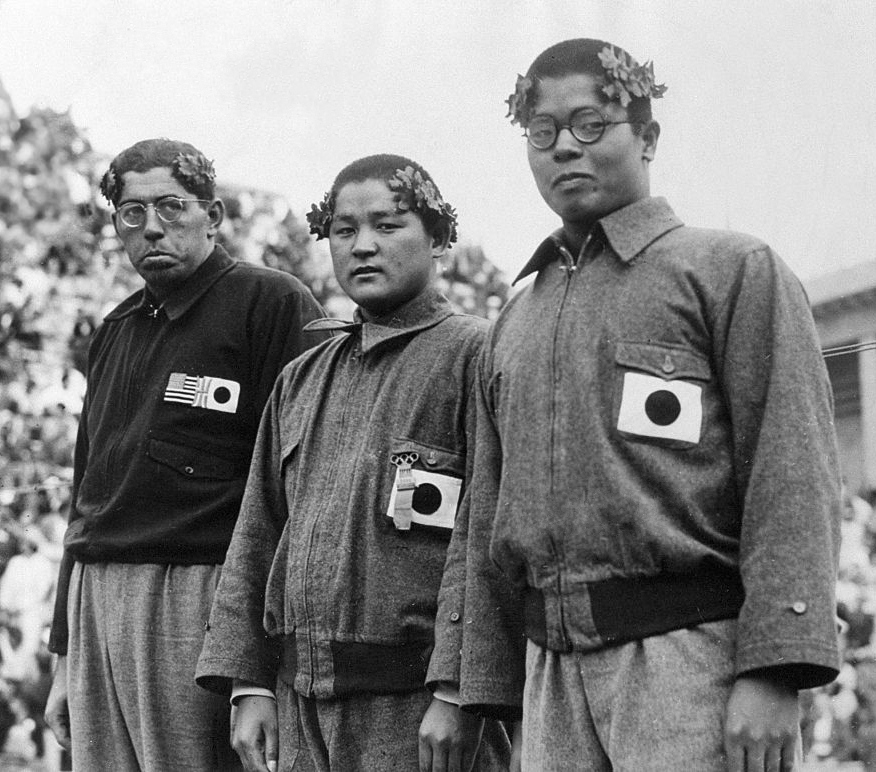
- Jack Medica, Noboru Terada and Shunpei Uto (right) at the 1936 Olympics

Personal information
- Born: 1 December 1918 Kakegawa, Shizuoka, Japan
- Education: Rikkyo University

Sport
- Sport: Swimming
Medal record
Representing Japan
Olympic Games
Silver medal – second place	1936 Berlin	400 m freestyle
Bronze medal – third place	1936 Berlin	1500 m freestyle

Shunpei Uto (鵜藤 俊平, Utō Shunpei; born 1 December 1918, date of death unknown) was a Japanese freestyle swimmer who won two medals at the 1936 Summer Olympics.

== Biography ==
Uto endured much hardship after World War II and deposited both his medals to a pawnshop to get some money for living. He later found a job in general affairs at the Niigata Nippo company.

After retiring he moved to Chiba Prefecture to do agriculture. Uto is deceased.
