= Patrick Nally =

British entrepreneur and specialist consultant (born 1947)

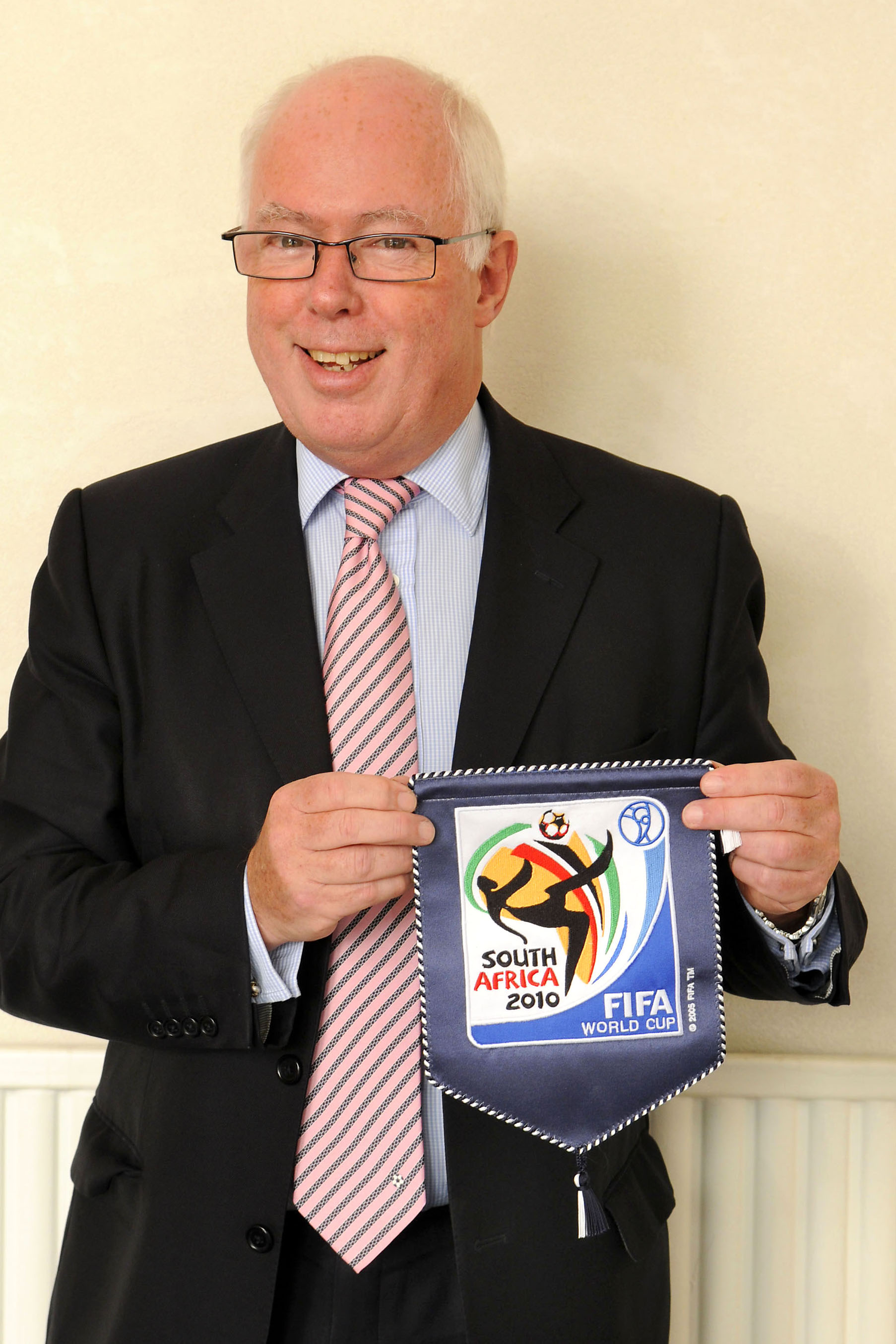
- Born: 1947 (age 78–79); London, England
- Occupation: Entrepreneur

Patrick Nally (born 1947) is a British entrepreneur and specialist consultant. He is widely acknowledged as the 'Founding Father' of modern sports marketing and a principal pioneer of today's sports business industry.

== Early life ==
Born in 1947 to parents who met while serving in the Royal Navy, Nally grew up in Clapham, south London, the youngest of three children born in consecutive years. A chess champion at Spencer Park School in Wandsworth, he gravitated towards his parents' professions of journalism and public relations, beginning his career in business as a messenger boy at Notley Advertising before joining the Erwin, Wasey & Company advertising agency as a junior accounts executive. His mother Margaret Nally, who was the first female chair of the National Union of Journalists' Press & P.R. department and the first female President of the Chartered Institute of Public Relations (CIPR), is commemorated each year at a Memorial Lecture given at Britain's House of Lords.

== West Nally ==
Having been introduced to the journalist, BBC presenter and sports commentator Peter West in 1969, Nally founded the West Nally Group the following year as a public relations agency with a specialised sporting events mandate. With West as chairman, and managing director Nally its driving force, the company would go on to redefine the sports business industry by pioneering the offering to 'blue chip' companies of exclusive, off-the-shelf packages of sponsorship rights to the world's largest sports tournaments on behalf of the world's leading sports federations. Early successes included securing investment to establish the Masters in snooker, the Squash World Open, and an annual one-day cricket competition which would run for three decades in the UK. In 1976, on brokering an agreement to sponsor the FIFA World Cup, the company assured its reputation as a leading innovator within the expanding sports marketing field. Employing over 400 staff in 14 offices across 11 countries in its heyday in the 1980s and 1990s, West Nally has served as partner to, among others, the International Olympic Committee, the International Federation of Association Football (FIFA), the Union of European Football Associations (UEFA), the Davis Cup and Federation Cup in tennis, the Hockey World Cup, the International Swimming Federation (FINA), the International Rowing Federation (FISA), the International Cycling Union (UCI) and the FIS World Ski Cup. The company helped secure the financial foundations of the first London Marathon, held in 1981, before playing an instrumental role in the inception of the International Association of Athletics Federations' Track and Field Program and in initiating the World Athletics Championships, first held in Helsinki in 1983. For the International Rugby Board (IRB), West Nally helped to commercially package and launch the Rugby World Cup, first held in 1987 in Australia and New Zealand. Known within the industry as the 'university of sports marketing' on account of its comprehensive training procedures responsible for cultivating a generation of leading sports business executives, the company's founder Patrick Nally was in 1988 described by Marketing magazine, along with Adidas owner Horst Dassler and IMG founder Mark McCormack, as one of the "three godfathers of sport" who at one time, between them, "controlled the commercial destinies of almost every major sports event in the world". Credited with first perceiving and harnessing sport's unique potential as a medium for global brand communication, Nally is today alternatively hailed as "the 'Founding Father' of sports marketing", "the father of modern sports marketing", "the founding father of the sports business industry", "the godfather of sports sponsorship" and the 'Dean' of the 'Sports Marketing University'. In 2009, his pioneer status within the industry was recognised with a nomination in the 'Outstanding Contribution' category at SportBusiness Magazine's annual Sports Event Management Awards.

=== Relationship with FIFA ===
After playing an instrumental role in João Havelange's successful 1974 bid for the Presidency of FIFA, Nally set out to fulfil the campaign's election promise to expand the federation's global development programme. Having restructured FIFA's rules and regulations and modernised its commercial structure, Nally conceived and designed the FIFA World Youth Championship, first held in Tunisia in 1977, for which he secured sponsorship from the Coca-Cola Company. The landmark agreement that followed, with which Coca-Cola became the primary sponsor of the 1978 World Cup in Argentina, would help set the cast for the future development of soccer globally, as the relationship between the FIFA World Cup and Coca-Cola matured to produce what has been described as "the biggest, most sustained corporate sponsorship programme in the world". Signed by West Nally in 1976, the original agreement is today considered a watershed moment within the evolution of the sports business industry. Nally himself has described it as "the best deal" he ever made.

==== The ‘InterSoccer4’ Program ====
After the 1978 World Cup, West Nally was awarded rights to all FIFA and UEFA competitions, including the European Cup Final, the European Nations Cup and the World Champions' Gold Cup, which the agency marketed together in a four-year package called the 'InterSoccer4'. Guaranteeing sponsors category exclusivity, advertising exposure, tickets and VIP access, after its successful implementation in the lead-up to the 1982 World Cup in Spain, the 'InterSoccer' model rapidly became the new industry standard by which sponsorship rights to international sporting events were administered. Signalling what has been called "sport's Big Bang Moment", the InterSoccer program's offer of a package of rights to multiple tournaments over several years is still today widely emulated across the sports business industry. According to SportBusiness International magazine, the concept became "the lingua franca of sports marketing for the next 20 years", confirming Patrick Nally as "in many respects, the man who made the World Cup what it is today". While the world's largest sports tournament grew to signify a multi-billion dollar sponsorship proposition, Nally oversaw the InterSoccer program's evolution through the 1986 and 1990 competitions, held respectively in Mexico and Italy, before helping to establish a dedicated company to host the 1994 World Cup in the US.

==== Support for Japan's 2022 World Cup Bid ====
In 2009, Nally teamed with the organising committee of Japan's 2022 World Cup bid which, on 2 December 2010 in a ceremony in Zürich was finally awarded to Qatar. Based around the slogan '208 smiles', the centerpiece of the Japanese offering was a proposal to broadcast the tournament via 360-degree, 3D free viewpoint television to over 400 fan sites across FIFA's 208 member-nations. In his vocal support for the innovative, technology-driven offering which would have brought the World Cup to Asia for the second time in two decades, Nally openly criticised FIFA for adhering to a development model he had himself been instrumental in originating. "It was almost part of our development programme brief to take it to Asia, as it was to take it to Africa," he told SportsPro Magazine in the lead-up to the decision:

“That stage of the whole evolution of development is now done… If you’re not going to embrace all those hyper-technological applications and opportunities to bring the excitement of a major live event like the World Cup into a local market, one, you’re not capturing where the world actually exists now; and two, your sponsors are not going to be too happy because activation is becoming a challenge. This responds to the sponsors’ activation needs, which is essential. It’s not a matter of FIFA wanting to do it, they have to do it.”

In the same article, Nally further admitted that he views the introduction of goal-line technology to the World Cup as all but "an inevitability".

=== Involvement with the International Olympic Committee ===
Having established relationships with the British and Australian Olympic Associations in the late 1970s, Nally began working with the International Olympic Committee (IOC) as an advisor to the organising committee of the 1980 Summer Games held in Moscow. Afterwards, he played a key role in laying the commercial foundations of the future of the Olympic Movement by adapting the InterSoccer program he'd devised for FIFA to the Olympic Games. The result was a package combining the rights of the IOC's organising committees and those of the national Olympic committees in one sponsorship deal. Initially rolled out for the 1984 Summer Games in Los Angeles, the concept would culminate the following year in the launch of the IOC's innovative TOP (The Olympic Partners) program.

==== Foundation of SportAccord ====
Through his decades-long association with the IOC and its longtime partner, the Japanese advertising and sponsorship agency Dentsu Incorporated, Nally has, over the course of his career, worked with an array of international Olympic and non-Olympic federations, helping them to ensure their commercial viability while also promoting enhanced global co-operation across the sporting world. His involvement with the General Association of International Sports Federations (GAISF) dates from 1976 when he was instrumental in re-establishing the organisation and securing for it a permanent home in Monte Carlo. He later devised the GAISF Calendar to assist international sports federations in avoiding conflicting event schedules.

==== Campaigns on behalf of new Olympic Sports ====
Having secured sponsorship for numerous international multi-sports tournaments over the years, including the 1979 Pan American Games held in San Juan, Puerto Rico, and the 1986 and 1990 Commonwealth Games held respectively in Edinburgh and Auckland, West Nally has also served non-Olympic world class sports federations with strategic advice, sponsorship procurement and by expanding their profiles at both single and multi-sports international championships. Of the 23 sports featured at the second quadrennial World Games, which West Nally was instrumental in staging across eight London venues in 1985, taekwondo would be introduced at the 1988 Summer Games in Seoul, netball would receive Olympic recognition within a decade and korfball would twice feature as a demonstration sport at the Summer Olympics. Having served the International Federation of Poker (IFP) since its foundation in Lausanne in April 2009, West Nally helped secure the federation membership within the International Mind Sports Association (IMSA) in April 2010.

=== Support for Sports Business Education ===
A respected authority on all aspects of sports marketing and sponsorship, Nally has since 2006 lectured as a Touring Fellow of the University of Manchester's World Academy of Sport and has, since March 2010, written a monthly column advising on sponsorship-related matters for the UK-based, sports business trade publication Platform. An impassioned advocate of the role of education within sport, he has advised UNESCO on the use of sport as a showcase to attract private sector support for educational and cultural programs, and has long been a vocal proponent of degree-based education tailored specifically to the sports business industry. In 2010 Nally became the Academic Director of IE Business School's Sports Management master's degree course.

==== Views on the Impact of New Media on the Sports Business Industry ====
Addressing the fourth annual Sports Marketing 360 conference in London in October 2010, Nally declared: “Conventional advertising is dead and conventional sports sponsorship is dead. The world is digital.” Having, for much of his career, seen the sports business come increasingly to be dominated by large advertising, marketing and talent representation agencies, Nally is outspoken in his anticipation of a future in which new media has replaced conventional controlling interests. “The era of dominant agencies is gone,” he told SportBusiness Magazine in 2003:

“The industry will inevitably undergo a major change over the next few years because it has to. The whole packaging and presentation of sport — the teams, the players, the dressing, the stadia, the corporate hospitality, the TV will all come together. It will be managed by high-quality, streamlined federations and professional leagues, with a lot more people in-house as opposed to a dominant agency like an ISL, IMG or Dentsu.”

As with Japan's 2022 World Cup bid, Nally is an ardent supporter of non-traditional sponsorship methods that enhance sport as a live-action experience. He has said before, “Sport has a tremendous ability to galvanise people. It is instant drama and instant theatre and it makes for the perfect live events... People want to be part of the event, they want instant connectivity and instant access.” As live events play an ever more crucial role in marketing, Nally argues that new media can provide opportunities to revolutionize traditional methods of activating brand-connection within its audience. Recalling his early success in transforming marketing strategies of sports federations, in a 2003 interview Nally lamented what he saw as the industry's failure to respond sufficiently to the needs of sponsors: “The creation of the product was what fascinated me and it fascinates me that it hasn’t really gone on much further,” he avowed, “but it could.”

=== Entertainment ===
Throughout his career, Nally has consulted on a range of aspects pertaining to sport as collective, immediate, live action experience, from stadia environment and venue design to the technological enhancement of audience appreciation systems. He helped popularise magazine-style sports TV programming, alongside pioneering the use of big screen technology within stadia by introducing Mitsubishi 'Diamond Vision' screens to Wembley Stadium in 1984. A decade later, he was involved in the planning stages of the watershed redevelopment of England's national stadium which reopened after a four-year reconstruction in March 2007. Alongside his sports marketing activities, Nally has also secured sponsorship for major music events including The Rolling Stones' 1982 European Tour, the David Bowie Serious Moonlight Tour, Duran Duran's 1984 UK Tour, Leonard Bernstein's 1986 series of Anniversary Concerts sponsored by Swiss watchmaker Ebel, The Three Tenors' 1990 concert in Rome, and the 2007 Tribute Concert to Maria Callas at the Acropolis. In addition to serving diverse companies in music, leisure and live entertainment, Nally has himself produced several theatrical musicals, notably Casper: The Musical based on the animated cartoon series Casper the Friendly Ghost, which ran at the Shaftesbury Theatre in London's West End from 1999 to 2000, and Theatre of Dreams, chronicling the history of Manchester United from the emergence of the Busby Babes to the Munich air disaster to the arrival of Alex Ferguson, which premiered in 2001 at Manchester's Bridgewater Hall and was a financial disaster.
