= Rainer Jacob =

German swimmer

Personal information
- Born: 15 September 1946 (age 79) Bremen, Allied-occupied Germany
- Height: 1.87 m (6 ft 2 in)
- Weight: 80 kg (180 lb)

Sport
- Sport: Swimming
- Club: Wasserfreunde Wuppertal
Medal record
Men's swimming
Representing West Germany
European Championships
Silver medal – second place	1970 Barcelona	4×100 m freestyle

Rainer Jacob (born 15 September 1946) is a retired German swimmer who won a silver medal in the 4 × 100 m freestyle relay at the 1970 European Aquatics Championships. He finished sixth in the same event at the 1972 Summer Olympics.

His mother, Gisela Jacob-Arendt, and uncle, Heinz Arendt, were German Olympic swimmers.
