= Ralph Flanagan (swimmer) =

American swimmer (1918–1988)

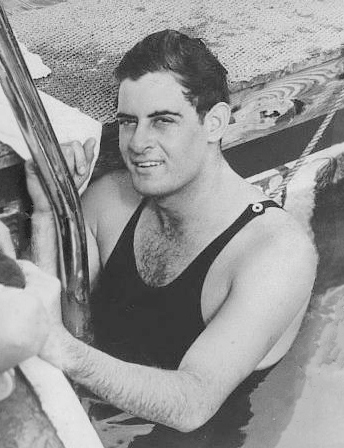
- Flanagan in 1938

Personal information
- Full name: Ralph Drew Flanagan
- National team: United States
- Born: December 14, 1918 Los Alamitos, California, U.S.
- Died: February 8, 1988 (aged 69) Los Alamitos, California, U.S.

Sport
- Sport: Swimming
- Strokes: Freestyle
- Club: Greater Miami Athletic Club
- College team: University of Texas
- Coach: Tex Robertson (U. Texas)
Medal record
Representing the United States
Olympic Games
Silver medal – second place	1936 Berlin	4×200 m freestyle

Ralph Drew Flanagan (December 14, 1918 – February 8, 1988) was an American competitive swimmer who competed for the University of Texas and represented the United States at two consecutive Summer Olympics during the 1930s, winning a silver medal in the 1936 Berlin Olympics.

== Olympics ==
As a 13-year-old at the 1932 Summer Olympics in Los Angeles, California, Flanagan competed in the semifinals of the men's 1,500-meter freestyle. Four years later at the 1936 Summer Olympics in Berlin, Germany, he won a silver medal as a member of the second-place U.S. team in the men's 4×200-meter freestyle relay. Individually, he finished fourth in the men's 400-meter freestyle and fifth in the men's 1,500-meter freestyle.

During the height of his training, he swam for the Miami Swim Club and the Miami Biltmore Aquatic Club. Flanagan won an unprecedented 20 American Athletic Union titles and set 26 American and two world records. During his career, he held every U.S. freestyle record ranging from the 220-yard event to the mile.

=== University of Texas ===
Flanagan swam for the University of Texas under Head Coach Tex Robertson. In his Senior year as a swimmer at Texas, Flanagan helped lead the Texas swim team to the Southwestern Conference team Championship. The 1939 University of Texas swim team featured 1936 Berlin Olympic 100-meter backstroke champion Adolph Kiefer, All-America backstroker Bob Tarleton, and team Captain freestyler Hondo Crouch.

=== Post-swimming careers ===
After his retirement from competitive swimming, he continued to serve the sport as a professional for the Red Cross, later serving as the director of safety programs for Los Angeles.

=== Honors ===
Flanagan was inducted into the International Swimming Hall of Fame as an "Honor Swimmer" in 1978.

== See also ==
- List of members of the International Swimming Hall of Fame
- List of Olympic medalists in swimming (men)
- List of University of Texas at Austin alumni
