= Tex Robertson =

American swimmer and swim coach

"Tex" Robertson
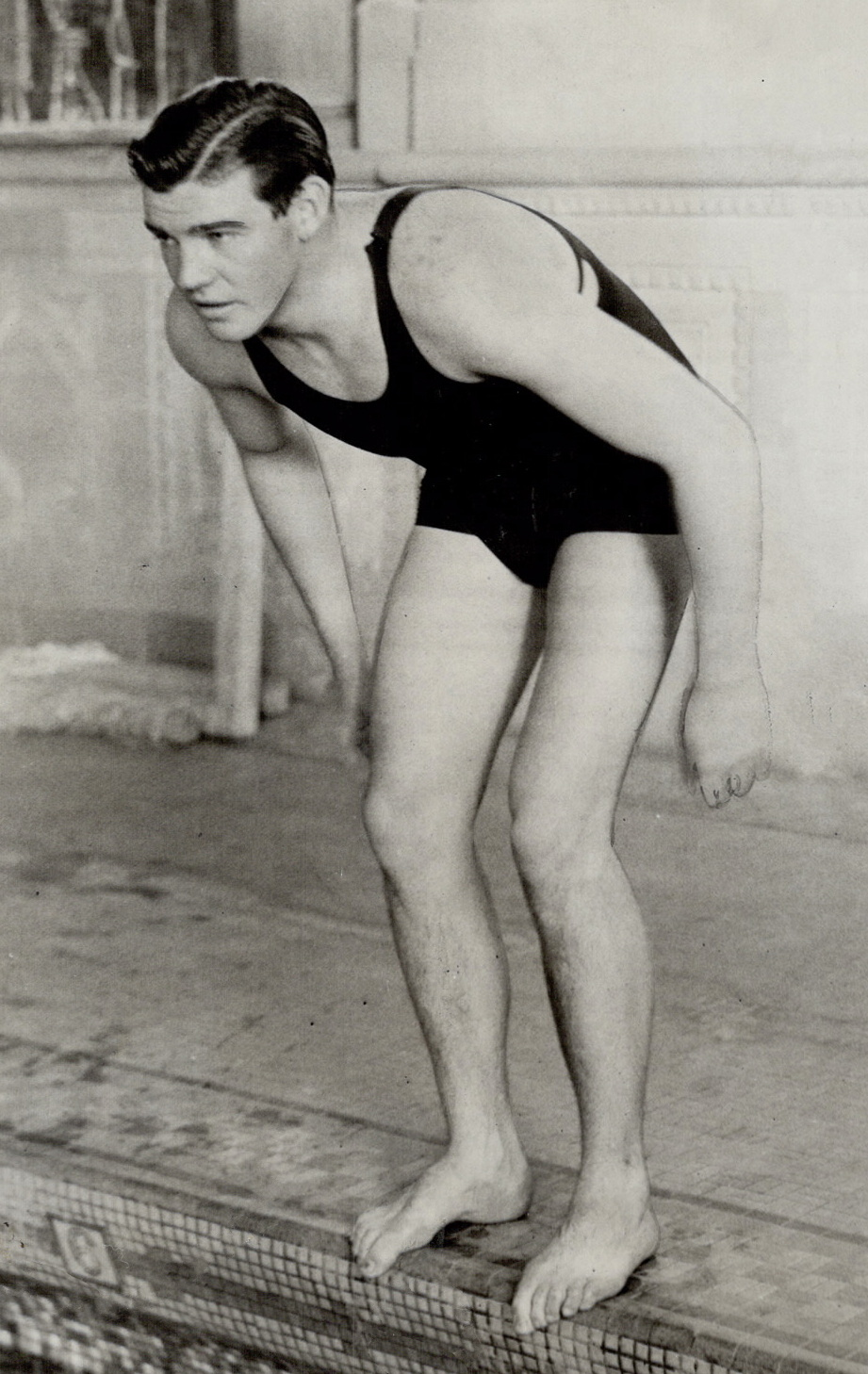
- Robertson as UT college competitor in 1935
- Born: Julian William Robertson; April 23, 1909; Sweetwater, Texas
- Died: August 27, 2007 (aged 98); Burnet, Texas
- Resting place: Sweetwater Cemetery; Sweetwater, Texas; 30.739785°N 98.384538°W
- Education: University of Michigan 1935 BA (Coach Matt Mann); University of Texas BS
- Occupation: U. Texas Swim Coach 1935-50
- Known for: 13 SEC Championships (UT Coach)
- Spouse: Pat Hudson
- Children: 5
- Awards: 1950 NCAA Coach of Year; International Swim. Hall of Fame; Tx. Swim & Dive Hall of Fame

Julian William "Tex" Robertson (April 23, 1909 – August 27, 2007) was an American swimmer and water polo player who competed for the University of Michigan and served as a Hall of Fame swimming coach for the University of Texas from 1935-1950. He founded Camp Longhorn, primarily a swim camp in Burnet, Texas, and later invented a flying disk game similar to the Frisbee.

== Early life ==
Julian Robertson was born April 23, 1909, in Sweetwater, Texas the youngest of four brothers to Frank G. Robinson, and Nancy Emmerson Robinson. He later moved to California receiving the nickname "Tex". When he was thirteen, he learned to swim in a nearby creek and often practiced his technique in a horse trough, winning his first race the following year.

=== University of Michigan ===
He attended the 1932 Summer Olympics as an alternate member of the U.S. Olympic Water Polo team that won a bronze medal. He first came to the attention of University of Michigan Coach Matt Mann while at the 1932 Olympics.

Robertson attended classes at the University of Southern California, and Los Angeles Junior College, then transferred to the University of Michigan, where he swam for Hall of Fame Coach Matthew Mann and graduated with a Bachelor of Arts in June 1935. While at Michigan, he excelled at the 220-yard and 440-yard freestyle, helping to lead the Wolverines to national championships in both 1934 and 1935. In their two national championship years, Robertson set new collegiate and Amateur Athletic Union records while continuing to win individual and team events for Michigan. He captured first place titles in both NCAA and Big 10 Conference championships.

== Coaching at U. Texas ==
From 1935-1950, Tex became the first full-time coach for the swimming team at the University of Texas. He broke from coaching at Texas to serve in WWII from 1943-1946. Tex had to convince UT that they needed a coach as the job was previously performed by a student volunteer. Though he was initially unsalaried, he worked as the lifeguard of the university pool, serviced Coke Machines, and worked summers at a camp in Michigan and at Camp Chikopi in Canada. He brought attention to the UT swim team by recruiting exceptional swimmers that became Olympic participants and medalists. While he coached from 1935 to 1950, the University of Texas swim team won thirteen consecutive Southwest Conference Swimming Championships. Robertson is also accredited with developing the "flip turn", which is used during freestyle and backstroke swimming events.

=== Outstanding UT swimmers ===
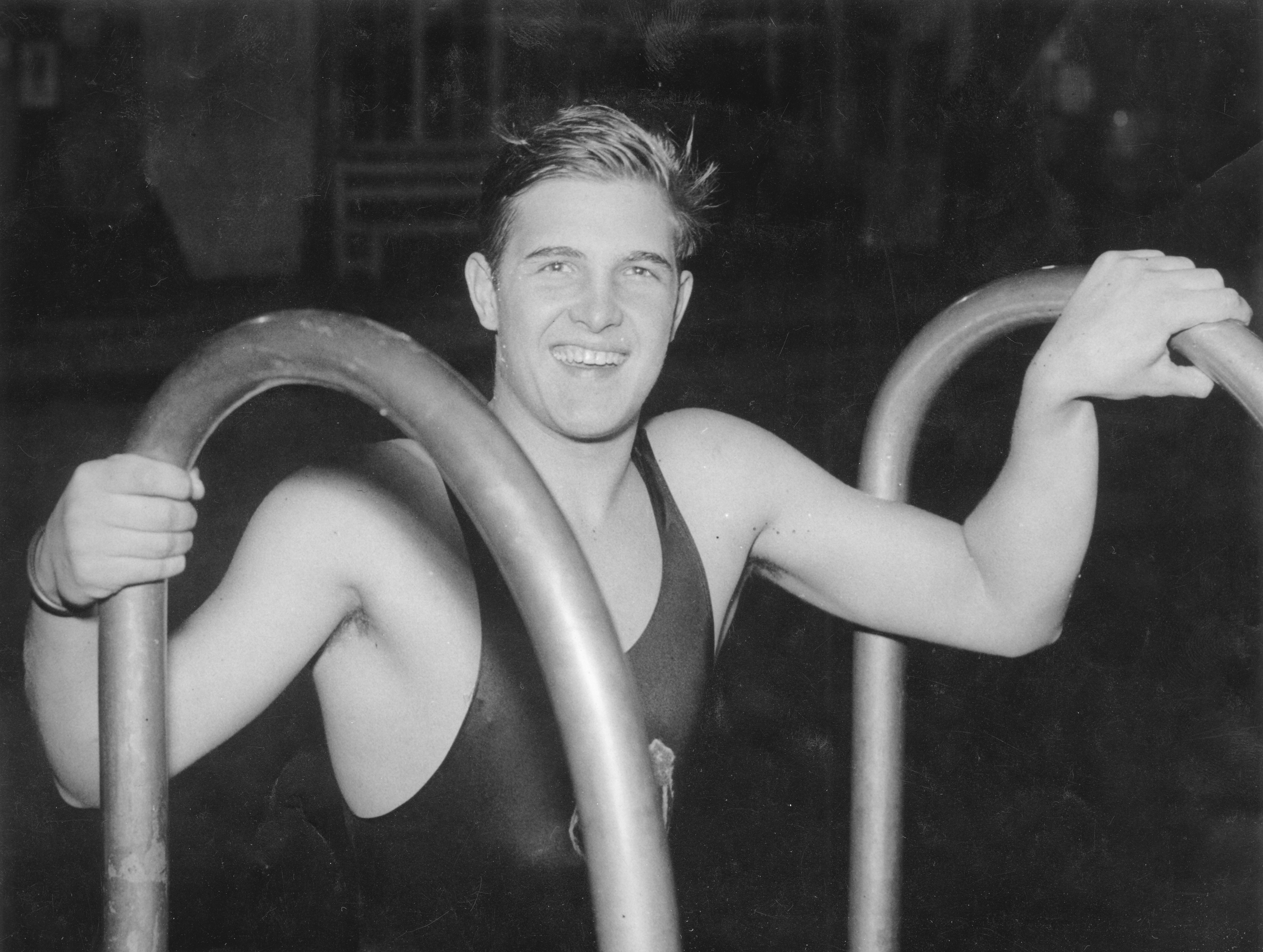
UT Swimmer, Olympian Adolph Kiefer in 1935

During his time at Texas, he trained backstroke world record holder Adolph Kiefer, who shortly before enrolling at the University of Texas, competed in the 1936 Summer Olympics, capturing a gold medal in the 100-meter backstroke. He coached 1932 Los Angeles and 1936 Berlin Olympian Ralph Flanagan, who won a silver medal at the 1936 Olympics in the 4x200 meter freestyle relay. 1938 All American breaststroker Mike Sojka was another talented swimmer coached by Robertson at Texas. The talented 1939 University of Texas swim team featured 1936 Olympic gold medalist Kiefer, freestyle distance world record holder Ralph Flanagan, All America breaststroker Mike Sojka, All-America backstroker Bob Tarleton, and team Captain freestyler Hondo Crouch, first UT Southwestern Conference Champion and future swim coach. Coach Robertson is credited with helping backstroke world record holder Kiefer adopt a more efficient hand entry for the backstroke that extended at an angle of around 45 degrees from the trunk of the body, rather than the earlier position directly in line with the trunk. He coached Zoologist Rollin Harold Baker, University of Texas's first swim team captain, and first All American.

Robertson later earned a Bachelor of Science degree from the University of Texas during his coaching tenure. In 1950 he retired as the UT Coach, but continued to improve Texas Swimming by creating WETS (Working Exes for Texas Swimming), and TAGS (Texas Age Group Swimming).

=== WWII service ===
During WWII, from 1943-46, he served with the U.S. Navy training Underwater Demolition Teams and survival swimming skills. He was stationed in San Diego and then transferred to Fort Pierce, FL where he began work with the Underwater Demolition Teams. Tex never quit coaching and led the Navy Swim Team to the National Navy Championships.

== Camp Longhorn ==
He started Camp Longhorn with his wife Pat Hudson in 1939 on Inks Lake in Burnet, Texas. He shut the camp down for three years from 1943-1945 when he served in World War II so he could join the United States Navy. When he returned from the war in 1945, he spent all his time coaching the Texas swimming team and running Camp Longhorn, using his swim athletes as counselors. The camp's primary objective was to teach children the importance of swimming and encourage children to make swimming an active role in their lifestyle.

Many popular camp objects were inspired from World War II. These included "the blob", a Vietnam-era, 40-foot long gasoline storage tank that was inflated and children jumped onto it while another flew off, along with ice cream lids children threw back and forth eventually becoming the Frisbee. Vic Malfronte, the World Frisbee champion, gives credit to Tex for creating the earliest organized sailing disc games. Tex grew up throwing metal can lids with neighborhood friends, and then introduced the game of throwing the "Sa-Lo" (which meant "sail it low") when he was a camper at Camp Wolverine in Michigan which is considered the birthplace of organized Frisbee. It was originally intended as a method for swimmers' times to be communicated to officials more quickly. Robertson then introduced the Frisbee to his camp in 1939.

=== Life after coaching retirement ===
Retiring in 1950 as the UT swim coach, Robertson focused entirely on Camp Longhorn with his wife Pat. The first year Camp Longhorn opened it had one camper and sixteen counselors, who consisted entirely of University of Texas swimmers. The camp spread into three different branches, with two located on Inks Lake (Camp Longhorn Inks Lake and C3) and the other, which opened in 1975, at Indian Springs, just a few miles east. Inks Lake is fed off the Colorado River and Indian Springs is fed off of two private spring-fed lakes, both located in the piney woods of Texas Hill Country. Tex came up with the term and famous slogan, "Attawaytogo" in 1939 to help campers encourage one another and realize that they are "somebody" at Camp Longhorn. Camp Longhorn has hosted as many as 4000 campers during the summer.

Robertson remained active as a swimmer with United States Masters Swimming, competing at the Masters level for many years, up to the age of 93. A few of his Masters world records still stand.

== Burnet accomplishments ==
Robertson influenced the Burnet community by bringing accessibility and the importance of swimming to Burnet, TX. For many years he taught youth how to swim in Inks Lake before creating his summer camp. In 1963, he brought the first public swimming pool to Burnet. For thirty years, the Burnet pool hosted Burnet's small high school state championships. In 1968, the girls' high school and college state championships were also held there. He also invented the Blob, a highly used toy in all water based summer camps.

Having suffered for years with congestive heart failure, Robertson died at the age of 98 on August 27, 2007 at his home on Inks Lake in Burnet, Texas, where he had founded Camp Longhorn. He continued to run the camp until he died at age 98, passing the camp to his five children: Nan, Sally, Robby, Bill, and John. He was buried at Sweetwater Cemetery, in Nolan County's Sweetwater, Texas, where he spent his early life.

=== Honors ===
He was inducted into the University of Texas Longhorn Hall of Fame in 1965, and later became a member of the International Swimming Hall of Fame where he received the Gold Medallion award in 2003. He was inducted into the Texas Swimming and Diving Hall of Fame in 1968, and was honored by the Lower Colorado River Authority, with inclusion in the LCRA Walk of Honor. In 2007, he received the United States Masters Swimming "Lifetime Achievement Award" for his contributions to his local masters swimming group and the national swimming community.
