= Noboru Terada =

Japanese swimmer (1917–1986)

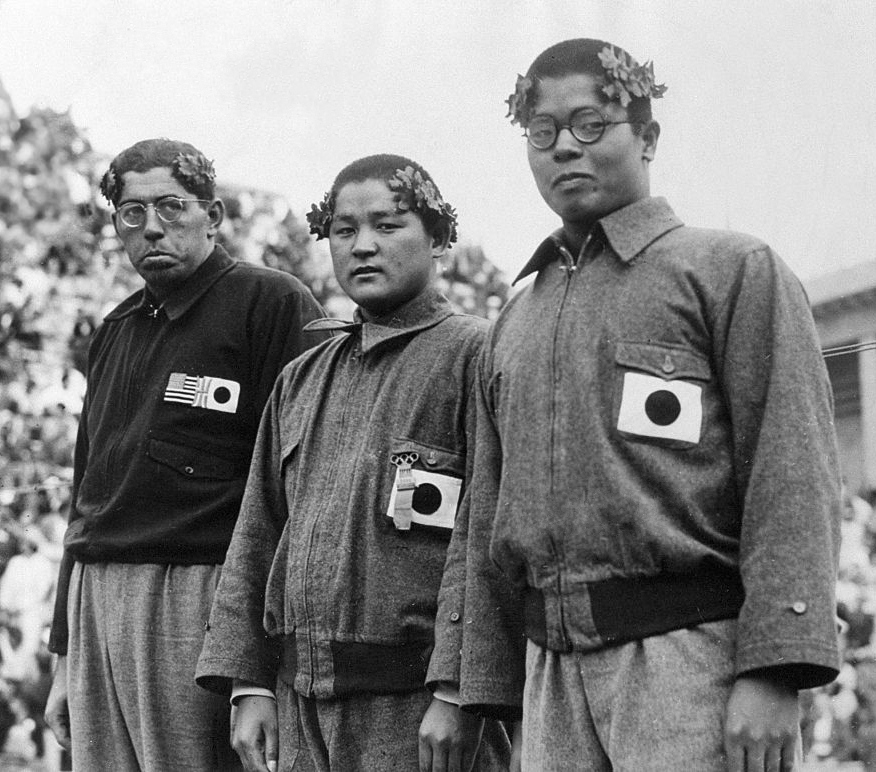
- Jack Medica, Noboru Terada and Shunpei Uto at the 1936 Olympics

Personal information
- Born: November 25, 1917 Shizuoka Prefecture, Japan
- Died: September 26, 1986 (aged 68)

Sport
- Sport: Swimming
Medal record
Representing Japan
Olympic Games
Gold medal – first place	1936 Berlin	1500 m freestyle

Noboru Terada (寺田 登, Terada Noboru; November 25, 1917 – September 26, 1986) was a Japanese freestyle swimmer. At the 1936 Olympics he won the gold medal in the 1500 m event with a margin of 10 seconds. In 1994 he was inducted into the International Swimming Hall of Fame.

== See also ==
- List of members of the International Swimming Hall of Fame
