= Swimming at the 1932 Summer Olympics – Men's 1500 metre freestyle =

Men's 1500 metre freestyle at the Games of the X Olympiad
- Venue: LA84 Foundation/John C. Argue Swim Stadium
- Dates: August 11, 1932 (heats); August 12, 1932 (semifinals); August 13, 1932 (final)
- Competitors: 15 from 8 nations
- Winning time: 19:12.4 OR

Medalists
1st place, gold medalist(s)		Kusuo Kitamura; Japan
2nd place, silver medalist(s)		Shozo Makino; Japan
3rd place, bronze medalist(s)		Jim Cristy; United States

The men's 1500 metre freestyle was a swimming event held as part of the swimming at the 1932 Summer Olympics programme. It was the sixth appearance of the event, which was established in 1908. The competition was held from Thursday 11 August 1932, to Saturday 13 August 1932.

Fifteen swimmers from eight nations competed.

== Records ==
These were the standing world and Olympic records (in minutes) prior to the 1932 Summer Olympics.

World record	19:07.2	(Sweden) Arne Borg	Bologna (ITA)	2 September 1927
Olympic record	19:51.8	(Sweden) Arne Borg	Amsterdam (NED)	6 August 1928

In the first semi-final Kusuo Kitamura set a new Olympic record with 19:51.6 minutes. Shozo Makino bettered this record in the second semi-final with 19:38.7 minutes. In the final Kusuo Kitamura again took the Olympic record with 19:12.4 minutes.

== Results ==
=== Heats ===
Thursday 11 August 1932: The fastest two in each heat and the fastest third-placed from across the heats advanced to the final. In the second heat Sunao Ishiharada and Boy Charlton tied for second place which allowed ten swimmers to advance to the semi-finals.

Heat 1

Place	Swimmer	Time	Qual.
1	Kusuo Kitamura (JPN)	19:55.2	QQ
2	Buster Crabbe (USA)	20:01.0	QQ
3	Jean Taris (FRA)	20:01.2	qq
4	Nalin Malik (IND)	23:52.4	

Heat 2

Place	Swimmer	Time	Qual.
1	Jim Cristy (USA)	19:58.4	QQ
2	Sunao Ishiharada (JPN)	20:09.5	QQ
2	Boy Charlton (AUS)	20:09.5	QQ

Heat 3

Place	Swimmer	Time	Qual.
1	Ralph Flanagan (USA)	20:06.0	QQ
2	Noel Ryan (AUS)	20:12.6	QQ
3	Giuseppe Perentin (ITA)	21:04.5	
4	Ignacio Gutiérrez (MEX)	22:39.2	

Heat 4

Place	Swimmer	Time	Qual.
1	Shozo Makino (JPN)	19:53.3	QQ
2	Paolo Costoli (ITA)	20:48.1	QQ
3	George Burrows (CAN)	22:19.6	
4	Manuel Villegas (MEX)	23:40.0	

=== Semifinals ===
Friday 12 August 1932: The fastest three in each semi-final advanced to the final.

Semifinal 1

Place	Swimmer	Time	Qual.
1	Kusuo Kitamura (JPN)	19:51.6	QQ OR
2	Jean Taris (FRA)	20:04.2	QQ
3	Jim Cristy (USA)	20:06.9	QQ
4	Sunao Ishiharada (JPN)	20:31.2	
5	Paolo Costoli (ITA)	20:58.7	

Semifinal 2

Place	Swimmer	Time	Qual.
1	Shozo Makino (JPN)	19:38.7	QQ OR
2	Buster Crabbe (USA)	19:51.8	QQ
3	Noel Ryan (AUS)	19:52.5	QQ
4	Boy Charlton (AUS)	19:53.1	
5	Ralph Flanagan (USA)	20:03.7	

=== Final ===
Saturday 13 August 1932:

Place	Swimmer	Time
1	Kusuo Kitamura (JPN)	19:12.4 OR
2	Shozo Makino (JPN)	19:14.1
3	Jim Cristy (USA)	19:39.5
4	Noel Ryan (AUS)	19:45.1
5	Buster Crabbe (USA)	20:02.7
6	Jean Taris (FRA)	20:09.7
