= Hiroshi Negami =

Japanese swimmer (1912–1980)

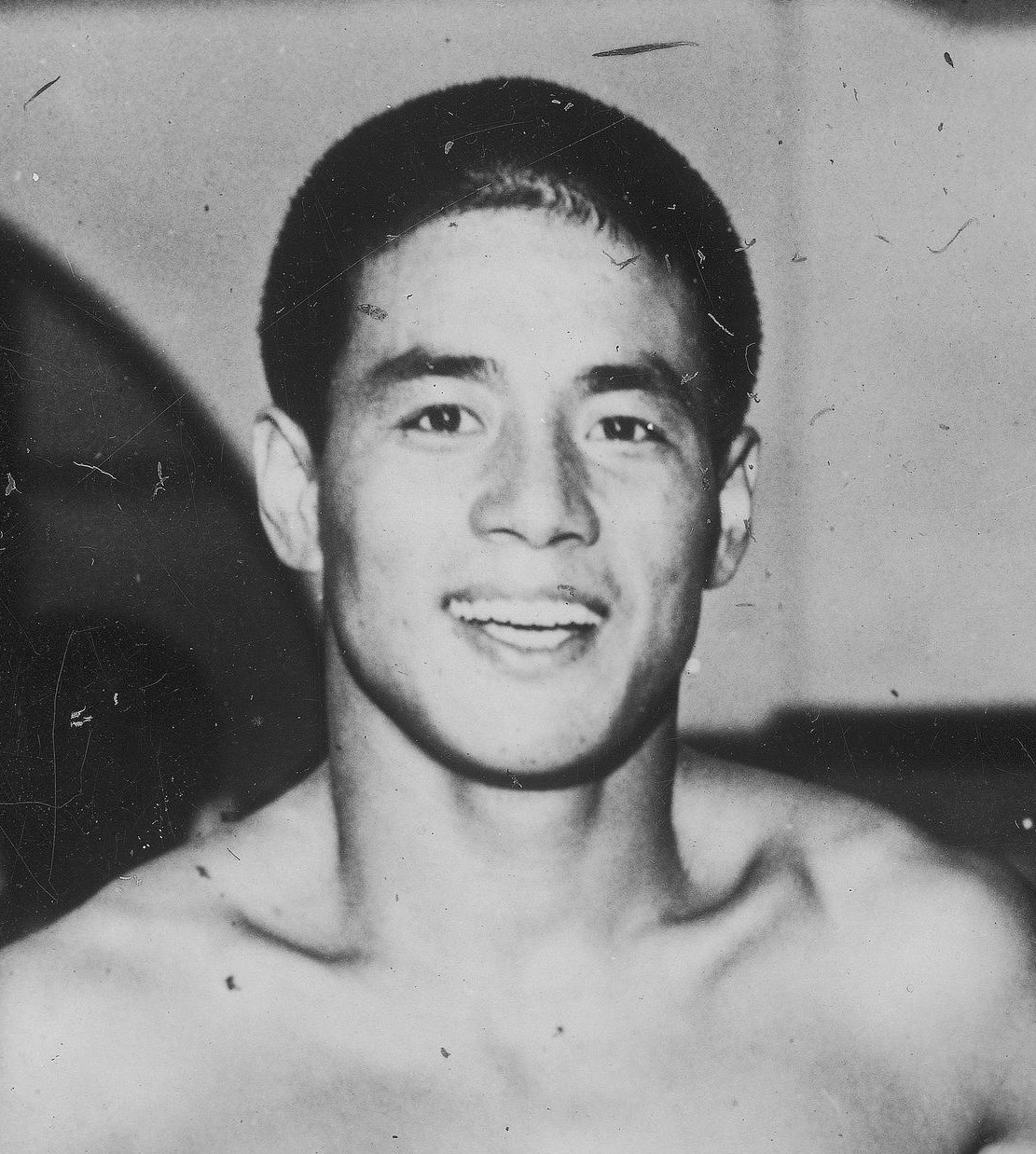
- Negami in 1935

Personal information
- Nationality: Japanese
- Born: 3 August 1912 Yoichi, Hokkaido, Japan
- Died: 1980 (aged 67–68)

Sport
- Sport: Swimming

Hiroshi Negami (根上 博, Negami Hiroshi; 3 August 1912 – 1980) was a Japanese swimmer. He competed in the men's 400 metre freestyle at the 1936 Summer Olympics.
