= Washington Guzmán =

Chilean swimmer

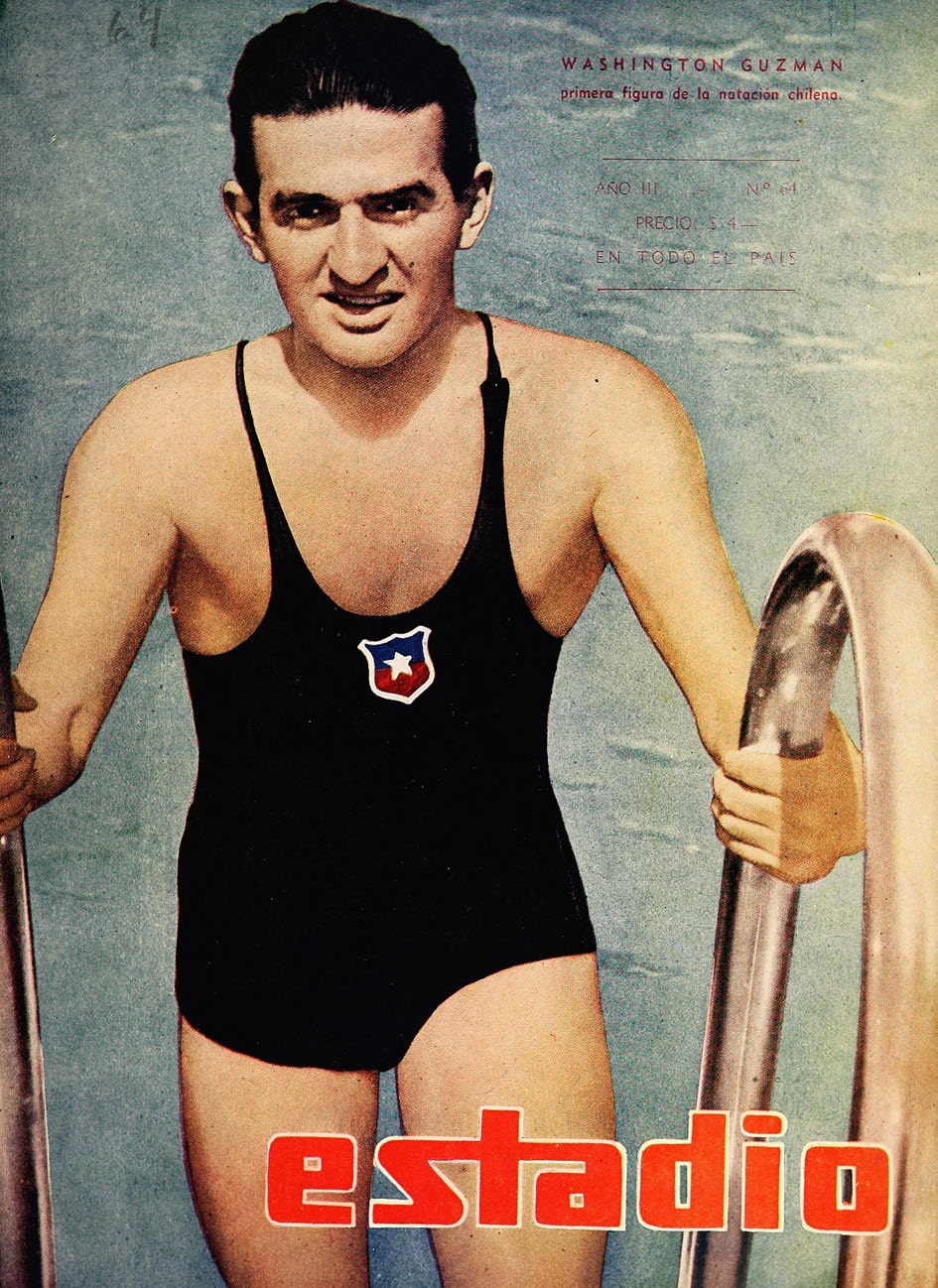

Personal information
- Born: 29 September 1918 Santiago, Chile
- Died: 2 February 1985 (aged 66) Valdivia, Chile

Sport
- Sport: Swimming

Washington Guzmán Soto (29 September 1918 – 2 February 1985) was a Chilean swimmer. He competed in the men's 400 metre freestyle at the 1936 Summer Olympics.
