= Werner Lehmann =

Swiss swimmer

Personal information
- Nationality: Swiss
- Born: 18 August 1915
- Died: October 1991 (aged 76)

Sport
- Sport: Swimming

Werner Lehmann (18 August 1915 – October 1991) was a Swiss swimmer. He competed in the men's 400 metre freestyle at the 1936 Summer Olympics.
