= Law School of Fluminense Federal University =

Fluminense Federal University Law School
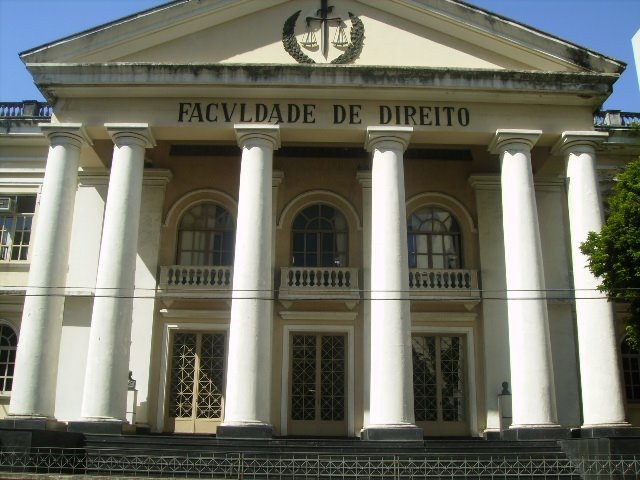
- Type: Public university
- Established: June 03, 1912
- Director: Prof. Dr. Wilson Madeira Filho
- Location: (Brazil) Niterói, Rio de Janeiro, Brazil
- Campus: Urban

The Fluminense Federal University Law School (Portuguese: Faculdade de Direito da Universidade Federal Fluminense) is a public legal education institution located at Rua Presidente Pedreira, 62, in the Ingá district of Niterói, Rio de Janeiro, Brazil. Founded in 1912 as the Faculdade Livre de Direito de Niterói (Free School of Law of Niterói), it became part of the Fluminense Federal University (UFF) following the 1960s university reform in Brazil.

Recognized as one of the oldest law schools in the country, the institution is known for its traditional doctrinal instruction, active academic research, and contributions to public service. In recent decades, the school has gained national recognition for its student engagement in legal theory, constitutional law, and social justice initiatives.

In the 14th Order of Attorneys of Brazil Bar Exam (OAB), the Fluminense Federal University Law School achieved a national Top 5 ranking, with an approval rate of 82.64%. This result reflected a historically strong performance in doctrinal instruction and legal examination readiness. The exam is a prerequisite for legal practice in the country and is considered one of the most rigorous professional licensure processes in Latin America. Performance in the OAB exam is commonly used as an informal benchmark for evaluating the quality of legal education institutions in Brazil.

== Bachelor ==
- Bachelor of Laws (LLB)

== Master ==
Titles: Master of Science in Law, Doctor of Science in Law

- Graduate Program in law and sociology
- Graduate Program in administrative justice
- Graduate Program in constitutional law

Title: Certificate in Law

- Certificate program in public administration
- Certificate program in private law
- Certificate program in civil procedure
- Certificate program in public finance and tax law

== PhD ==
- The Graduate Program in Law at Fluminense Federal University (UFF), located in Niterói, offers a doctoral degree. The program aims to train researchers and academic professionals with a strong theoretical and methodological foundation, capable of producing original contributions in the field of legal studies.

== Notable Alumni in Law, politics, and culture ==
=== Brazilian Presidents ===
- Ranieri Mazzilli, 25th President of the Brazil

=== Cabinet of Brazil ===
- Nelson Hungria, Minister Supreme Federal Court and former professor
- Oliveira Viana, Minister Federal Court of Accounts
- Waldemar Zveiter, Minister Supreme Federal Court
- João Augusto de Araújo Castro, Ambassador to the US and United Nations, and Minister of Foreign Affairs
- Brígido Fernandes Tinoco, Ministry of Education
- Ewald Sizenando Pinheiro, Minister Federal Court of Accounts
- Geraldo Montedônio Bezerra de Menezes, Minister and president Superior Labor Court
- Celso Barroso Leite, Minister Ministry of Social Security, also served as Officer of the National Social Welfare Department and hired by the ILO - International Labor Organization to structure the Social Security System of Angola in Africa.

=== Sport, Culture, and Arts ===
- João Havelange, Former President of FIFA
- Wisrah C. V. da R. Celestino, award-winning Brazilian artist living in Germany
