= Kusuo Kitamura =

Japanese swimmer (1917–1996)

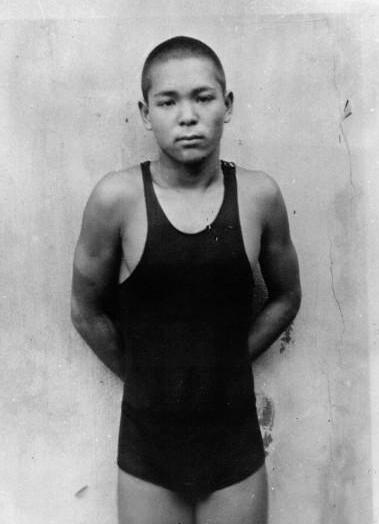
- Kusuo Kitamura in 1932

Personal information
- Full name: 北村 久寿雄
- Nationality: Japanese
- Born: October 19, 1917 Kōchi, Japan
- Died: June 6, 1996 (aged 78)

Sport
- Sport: Swimming
- Strokes: freestyle
Medal record
Representing Japan
Olympic Games
| Gold medal – first place | 1932 Los Angeles | 1500 m freestyle |

Kusuo Kitamura (北村 久寿雄, Kitamura Kusuo; October 9, 1917 – June 6, 1996) was a Japanese swimmer who competed at the 1932 Summer Olympics in Los Angeles, California.

Kitamura was born in Kōchi, Japan. Selected as one of the youngest members of the Japanese swimming team in the 1932 Los Angeles Olympics, he won the gold medal in the Men's 1500 meter freestyle swimming event. He was 14 years and 309 days old at the time, setting a record for youngest ever swimmer to win a gold medal at the Olympic Games. This record lasted until the 1988 Summer Olympics in Seoul, Korea, when Hungarian swimmer Krisztina Egerszegi won the gold in the Women's 200-meter backstroke event. However, Kitamaura still holds the record for the youngest male swimmer.

After the 1932 Olympics, Kitamura retired from competitive sports, and eventually graduated from Tokyo Imperial University, and obtained a job at the Japanese Ministry of Labor. He rose through the bureaucratic ranks, eventually becoming a department head, before retiring in 1984 to become a director at Sumitomo Cement.

== See also ==
- List of members of the International Swimming Hall of Fame
