= Hans Brenner (swimmer) =

Swiss swimmer

Personal information
- Born: 14 September 1912
- Died: 18 December 1977 (aged 65)

Sport
- Sport: Swimming
- College team: Swiss

Hans Brenner (14 September 1912 – 18 December 1977) was a Swiss freestyle swimmer. He competed in the men's 400 metre freestyle at the 1936 Summer Olympics.
