= Shozo Makino (swimmer) =

Japanese swimmer (1915–1987)

Makino Shōzō
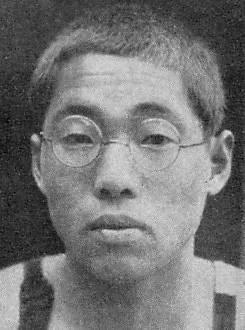

Personal information
- Native name: 牧野 正蔵
- Nationality: Japanese
- Born: May 15, 1915 Shizuoka Prefecture, Japan
- Died: February 12, 1987 (aged 71)

Sport
- Sport: Swimming
- Event(s): 400-meter Freestyle; 1500-meter freestyle
Medal record
Men's Swimming
Representing Japan
Olympic Games
Silver medal – second place	1932 Los Angeles	1500 m freestyle
Bronze medal – third place	1936 Berlin	400 m freestyle

Shozo Makino (牧野 正蔵, Makino Shōzō; May 15, 1915 – February 12, 1987) was a Japanese Olympic swimmer. He won a silver medal for the Men's 1500 meter freestyle event in the 1932 Summer Olympics in Los Angeles, and a bronze medal for the Men's 400 meter freestyle event in the 1936 Summer Olympics in Berlin.

Makino was born in Shizuoka Prefecture, Japan, and was a graduate of Waseda University. On August 30, 1931, while still a middle school student, he set a new world record for the Men's 800-meter freestyle with a time of 10 minutes 16.6 seconds.

== Competitive highlights ==
- 1932 Olympics 1500 m freestyle - 19:14.1
- 1936 Olympics 400 m freestyle - 4:48.1

== See also ==
- List of members of the International Swimming Hall of Fame
- World record progression 400 metres freestyle
- World record progression 800 metres freestyle
