= Hans Freese =

German swimmer (1918–1941)

Personal information
- Full name: Johann Heinrich Freese
- Nationality: German
- Born: 17 February 1918 Bremen, German Empire
- Died: 8 July 1941 (aged 23) Bremen, Nazi Germany

Sport
- Sport: Swimming
Medal record
Representing Germany
European Championships
Gold medal – first place	1938 London	4x200m freestyle relay

Johann Heinrich Freese (17 February 1918 – 8 July 1941) was a German swimmer who competed in the 1936 Summer Olympics. He was killed in action during the Second World War.

== Personal life ==
Free served in the German Army during the Second World War. He was severely wounded during the Siege of Leningrad, and died of his wounds in Bremen. Feldwebel in the German Army.
