= Heinz Arendt =

German swimmer (1917–2006)

Personal information
- Born: 16 May 1917 Berlin, Germany
- Died: 5 January 2006 (aged 88) Unkel, Germany

Sport
- Sport: Swimming
- Club: Poseidon Berlin
Medal record
Men's swimming
Representing Germany
European Championships
Bronze medal – third place	1938 London	1500 m freestyle

Heinz Arendt (16 May 1917 – 5 January 2006) was a German swimmer. He won a bronze medal in the 1500 metre freestyle at the 1938 European Aquatics Championships. He finished seventh in the same event at the 1936 Summer Olympics.

His sister Gisela Jacob-Arendt and nephew Rainer Jacob were German Olympic swimmers, and Gisela competed along with her brother at the 1936 Games.
