= Otto Przywara =

German swimmer

Personal information
- Born: 20 September 1914 Schwientochlowitz, Germany
- Died: 14 November 2000 (aged 86)

Sport
- Sport: Swimming

Otto Przywara (20 September 1914 – 14 November 2000) was a German swimmer. He competed in two events at the 1936 Summer Olympics. Because his surname sounded too Polish, he took the German name Kutz during World War II.
