= Luisa Strina =

Brazilian art collector and gallerist

- Born: Luisa Malzone Strina; 18 June 1943; São Paulo
- Occupation: Art collector, gallerist
- Employer: Galeria Luisa Strina (1974–)

Luisa Malzone Strina (born 18 June 1943) is a Brazilian art gallerist and art collector. Her gallery, Galeria Luisa Strina, is the oldest contemporary art gallery in Brazil.

== Early life ==
Luisa Malzone Strina was born on 18 June 1943 in São Paulo to Italian parents. Her father came from Northern Italy, and her mother came from Southern Italy. Strina started studying psychology, but dropped out. She also took a nursing course and worked in an insurance company.

== Art career ==
After these experiences, she took free courses, such as photography and painting, at Fundação Armando Alvares Penteado (FAAP), where she met Brazilian artists Carlos Fajardo and Luiz Paulo Baravelli, who were her professors at FAAP. If on one hand, she recognized that she had no skill to be an artist, she had found her vocation as a marchand (art dealer) and gallerist, scheduling exhibitions in museums and galleries for the artists she met.

In 1974, Baravelli, who had a studio at street Padre João Manuel, in Cerqueira César neighborhood in São Paulo city, complained about the prices of renting the place, so he suggested Strina open an art gallery there. Strina then founded Galeria Luisa Strina, with an inaugural exhibition that same year, with the participation of artists such as Carlos Fajardo, Edo Rocha, José de Moura Resende Filho, Luiz Paulo Baravelli, Nelson Leirner, Rubens Gerchman, Santuza Andrade, and Wesley Duke Lee. She sought to take Brazilian art to the broader world stage, later telling the Financial Times, “Until 1985, the country was closed to export. We were so isolated. It wasn’t just about women artists, it was any artists.”

In the same year, she brought to Brazil for the first time works by American pop artists Roy Lichstenstein, James Rosenquist, Jim Dine, and Andy Warhol.

In an interview for the magazine Valor Econômico, Strina recognizes her role as an agent for the artists she works with. Instead of buying art and waiting for it to appreciate in the private market, she tries to promote the artists she works with, placing the works in museums and relevant collections in the art world. She also has a preference for selling the works to art museums, thus giving the works more visibility. She is particularly known for her role in promoting women artists from Brazil like Lygia Pape.

ArtReview, a London-based magazine, makes an annual list of the most powerful and influential people in the international art field. In 2012, Strina was ranked 61st in the British magazine's ranking, ahead of artists and art collectors like Takashi Murakami, John Baldessari, Yayoi Kusama, and Brazilian businessman Bernardo Paz, founder of the Inhotim Institute. Since 2012, her position in the ranking has fluctuated, peaking in 2017 at 49th.

== Personal life ==
Strina was married to Wesley Duke Lee for eight years. She lives in Higienópolis neighborhood in São Paulo.
