= Clarissa Tossin =

Brazilian-American artist

- Born: 1973 (age 52–53); Porto Alegre, Rio Grande do Sul, Brazil
- Education: California Institute of the Arts (MFA 2009)
- Known for: Video, Installation, Sculpture, Amazon delivery box weavings
- Website: clarissatossin.com

Clarissa Tossin (born 1973) is a visual artist from Brazil and based in Los Angeles. Her collaborative, research-based practice develops alternative narratives found in the built environment, using elements of installation, sculpture, and moving image to explore intersections of place, history, and aesthetics.

== Early life and education ==
Born in Porto Alegre in southern Brazil, Tossin grew up in the capital city of Brasília. She attended college in São Paulo at Fundação Armando Álvares Penteado (FAAP), then moved to Los Angeles in 2006 to pursue graduate study at CalArts, receiving her MFA in 2009.

== Work ==
Tossin's work upon moving to Los Angeles often referred back to her previous life in Brasília, using her own migration as a mode of understanding modernity, urban development, and globalization. Her installation Brasília, Cars, Pools and Other Modernities (2009–2013) establishes an architectural bridge between the two cities: Oscar Niemeyer, responsible for Brasília's urban plan, also designed the Strick House in Santa Monica. Through videos, sculptures, photographs, and ephemera, including a 1973 Volkswagen Brasília loaded with pool-cleaning equipment, the work brings out the cities' shared architecture, swimming pools, and car culture, as well as their convergent histories of urbanization alongside the burgeoning auto industry and highway infrastructure, elaborating their paradoxically utopian and dystopic place in the global imagination.

Tossin's next major body of work focused on the Amazon region and its histories of industrial incursion and architectural displacement. The video and sound installation Streamlined: Belterra, Amazónia/Alberta, Michigan (2013) deal with Belterra, a rubber plantation in the Brazilian Amazon, and Alberta, Michigan, an Upper Peninsula sawmill town, both modeled on New England villages and built concurrently in 1935 to source materials for auto manufacturing in the United States. Encontro das Águas / Meeting of Waters (2018), an installation investigating the manufacture of electronics in the Free Economic Zone of Manaus, includes terra cotta casts of electronics produced in Manaus, woven satellite images from the region sourced from Google Earth, and cut down Amazon.com delivery boxes woven into baskets.

=== Climate crisis and space exploration ===
Much of Tossin's most recent work examines the origins and impacts of the climate crisis, increasingly through the lens of 21st century space exploration. These works connect plans for mining and settlement of the Moon and Mars with terrestrial legacies of resource extraction, colonialism, and environmental degradation on Earth. According to curator Sandrine Wymann, "Tossin contemplates the day, not far off, when we exhaust this planet's resources and flee to Mars to begin anew, as an extra-terrestrial civilization with no choice but to continue elsewhere or perish."

The suspended, double-sided circular weavings in A Queda do Céu (The Falling Sky) (2019) interlace satellite views of the Amazon River and 2019 fires in Amazônia with NASA images of the great Martian plain Amazonis Planitia and the Milky Way, comprising woven patterns that resemble agricultural land partitions viewed from space. Similarly, Tossin's Future Geography (2021) weavings combine strips of Amazon.com delivery boxes with NASA images of Shackleton Crater on the Moon (proposed site of the first US lunar ice mining facility), Jezero Crater on Mars (landing site of NASA's Perseverance rover), and the Hyades star cluster (the nearest to the Solar System), highlighting the intersection of scientific and commercial interests in space exploration.

The 8th Continent (2021), a triptych of large-scale jacquard tapestries commissioned by Rice University, represents the culmination of Tossin's interest in science and commerce converging in outer space. Working with Rice's Space Institute and Houston's Lunar and Planetary Institute, Tossin sourced NASA images surveying the Moon's permanently shadowed polar craters for concentrations of water ice, to be mined for use in making hydrogen fuel for deep space ventures, including NASA's proposed Artemis missions. Mapmaking has long been used to establish and project territorial sovereignty, and NASA's surveys of lunar resources are no exception. Harking back to the gilt and silk threaded tapestries of the medieval and Renaissance periods, Tossin recontextualizes these images within a regal tradition of showcasing sovereign wealth and power; metallic gold threading indicates likely stores of lunar ice—the gold of the future.

Death by Heat Wave (Acer pseudoplatanus, Mulhouse Forest) (2021) ponders the demise of all life in the death of a single tree. A silicone cast of a decomposing sycamore from the Mulhouse forest signals the mass die-off of sycamores across the region due to rising temperatures, while measuring the pace of human activity against much slower natural cycles of decay and regeneration. Another work, Rising Temperature Casualty (Prunus persica, home garden, Los Angeles) (2021), features a silicone cast of a peach tree from Tossin's garden in Los Angeles. Taken together, they register both the global reach of climate change and the similarity of its effects for disparate species in widely separated places. Vulnerably Human (2022), a silicone-based skin-shed cast of an astronaut suit incorporating meteorite powder, tree bark, and soil, evokes the precarious next stage of human civilization, bridging the vulnerability of human bodies in space with the fragility of life on Earth.

=== Reclaiming the Mayan Revival ===
Another important focus in Tossin's recent work involves 1920s Mayan Revival architecture, which co-opted the architecture and iconography of pre-Columbian Mesoamerica.

The single-channel video Ch'u Mayaa draws out the suppressed influence of Maya architecture on Frank Lloyd Wright's Hollyhock House (1919–1921), foregrounding the building's Indigenous symbology through a dance performance by Crystal Sepúlveda based on gestures and postures found in ancient Maya ceramics and murals, thus reclaiming the building to the Maya architectural lineage. A series of sculptures based on the Mayan Theater (1927), a landmark movie palace in Los Angeles, form the basis of Tossin's installation The Mayan (2017). The theater's interior design by Francisco Cornejo directly appropriates motifs found in several Maya sites: Quiriguá and Piedras Negras in Guatemala, and Yaxchilán in Mexico. Tossin exposes this mimicry with skin-like silicone imprints of the reliefs that decorate the theater's doors and walls, combined with plaster casts of hands and feet sourced from the archeological sites, and bits of faux jaguar fur, quetzal feather, and serpent skin.

Tossin's collaborative film Mojo'q che b'ixan ri ixkanulab' / Antes de que los volcanes canten / Before the Volcanoes Sing (2022) presents an immersive sensory journey across languages, music, and architectural spaces that are variously imagined and real, cosmological and colonized. Commissioned by EMPAC, the work centers on 3D printed playable replicas of ancient Maya musical instruments, 3D scanned and modeled by archaeologist and curator Jared Katz, exploring their capacity to voice alternative modes of knowledge. The film's narrative follows the personal histories of its Maya protagonists, including K'iche'-Kaqchiquel poet Rosa Chávez, Ixil Maya artist Tohil Fidel Brito Bernal (who appears inside the Mayan Revival Sowden House in Los Angeles), and Mexican flautist Alethia Lozano Birrueta, featuring music and sound design by Brazilian composer Michelle Agnes Magalhães and cinematography by Jeremy Glaholt.

As art historian Susanna Phillips Newbury observes:

"Whether reinserting figurative traditions and ritual practices of Mayan motifs in early twentieth-century Los Angeles architecture, as in her 2017 video Ch'u Mayaa, or more broadly examining a grotesque, postlapsarian world, [Tossin] employs the future perfect language of speculative science to propose ways of seeing our devastated present."

== Exhibitions ==
Tossin's solo exhibitions include:

- to take root among the stars at the Frye Art Museum, Seattle (2023)
- Vulneravelmente Humano / Vulnerably Human at Galeria Luisa Strina, São Paulo (2023)
- Falling From Earth at Museum of Contemporary Art Denver (2022)
- Disorientation Towards Collapse at Commonwealth and Council, Los Angeles (2022)
- Circumnavigation towards exhaustion at La Kunsthalle Mulhouse, France (2021)
- Off the Wall: Clarissa Tossin, The 8th Continent at Rice University, Houston (2021)
- Future Fossil at the Harvard Radcliffe Institute, Cambridge (2019)
- 21st Century Wisdom: Healing Frank Lloyd Wright's textile block houses at the 18th Street Arts Center, Santa Monica (2019)
- Encontro das Águas / Meeting of Waters at the Blanton Museum of Art, Austin (2018)
- Azul Maia / Maya Blue at Galeria Luisa Strina, São Paulo (2018);
- The Mayan at Commonwealth and Council, Los Angeles (2017);
- Stereoscopic Vision at Wesleyan University (2017);
- Streamlined: Belterra, Amazónia/Alberta, Michigan at the Museum of Latin American Art, Long Beach (2015);
- Brasília Teimosa at Fundação Joaquim Nabuco, Recife, BR (2015);
- Transplantado (VW Brasilia) at Galeria Luisa Strina, São Paulo (2014);
- Brasília, Cars, Pools & Other Modernities at Artpace, San Antonio (2013);
- Blind Spot at the Blaffer Art Museum, University of Houston (2013); and Gasto / Spent at Galeria Luisa Strina, São Paulo (2011).

Her group exhibitions include:

- Born in Flames: Feminist Futures at the Bronx Museum of the Arts (2021)
- the Dhaka Art Summit, Bangladesh (2020)
- Pacha, Llaqta, Wasichay: Indigenous Space, Modern Architecture, New Art at the Whitney Museum of American Art, New York (2018)
- the 12th Gwangju Biennale, South Korea (2018)
- Made in L.A. at the Hammer Museum, Los Angeles (2014).

== Awards & recognition ==
Tossin's work has been supported by grants from the Graham Foundation (2020) and the Foundation for Contemporary Art (2019), a Fellowship Award from Fellows of Contemporary Art (2019), an Artadia Los Angeles Award (2018), a Fundación Jumex grant (2018), a California Community Foundation Fellowship for Visual Artists (2014), and a Center for Cultural Innovation grant (2012).

Tossin was a Fellow at the Harvard Radcliffe Institute (2017–18), a CORE Program Fellow at the Museum of Fine Arts, Houston (2010–12), and was artist-in-residence at Fundação Joaquim Nabuco, Recife, BR (2015); Artpace San Antonio (2013); and the Skowhegan School of Painting and Sculpture (2009), among others.

== Collections ==
- Art Institute of Chicago, Chicago, IL
- Hammer Museum, Los Angeles, CA
- Harvard Art Museums, Cambridge, MA
- Kadist Art Foundation, San Francisco, CA
- Los Angeles County Museum of Art, Los Angeles, CA
- Museum of Fine Arts, Houston, TX
- MSU Broad At Museum, Michigan State University, East Lansing, MI
- New Orleans Museum of Art, New Orleans, LA
- Smith College Museum of Art, Northampton, MA
- Whitney Museum of American Art, New York, NY
- Casa Niemeyer, Universidade de Brasília, Brazil
- Inhotim Institute, Brumadinho, Brazil

== Publications ==
Tossin, Clarissa. Unmapping the World / Desmapeando O Mundo. Edited by Teté Martinho, with essays by Moacir dos Anjos, Michael Ned Holte, and Guilherme Wisnik. 2015. (ISBN 978-0-692-45968-3)
