= Galeria Luisa Strina =

Art gallery in São Paulo, Brazil

- Established: 1974
- Location: São Paulo, Brazil
- Coordinates: 23°33′51″S 46°39′51″W
- Type: art gallery
- Founder: Luisa Strina
- Website: www.galerialuisastrina.com.br
- Location of Galeria Luisa Strina

Galeria Luisa Strina is an art gallery founded by art collector Luisa Malzone Strina. The main gallery and its annex are located in São Paulo, Brazil. It is the oldest art gallery of contemporary art in Brazil.

== History ==
The gallery opened in 1974, with an inaugural exhibition in the same year, with the participation of artists such as Carlos Fajardo, Edo Rocha, José de Moura Resende Filho, Luiz Paulo Baravelli, Nelson Leirner, Rubens Gerchman, Santuza Andrade, and Wesley Duke Lee.

Galeria Luisa Strina was the first Latin American gallery to be invited to the art fair Art Basel, located in Basel, Switzerland, em 1992.

== Artists ==
In the 1990s, the gallery started working with Brazilian artists, such as Alexandre da Cunha, Fernanda Gomes and Marcos Reis Peixoto (known as Marepe). Currently, the gallery represents 40 artists, including:

- Leonor Antunes
- Olafur Eliasson
- Fernanda Gomes
- Alfredo Jaar
- Renata Lucas
- Cildo Meireles

In addition, the gallery manages various artist estates, including:

- Robert Rauschenberg

== Administration ==
The museum's directors are Marli Matsumoto and Thamy Echigo. The gallery is represented internationally by María Quiroga.
