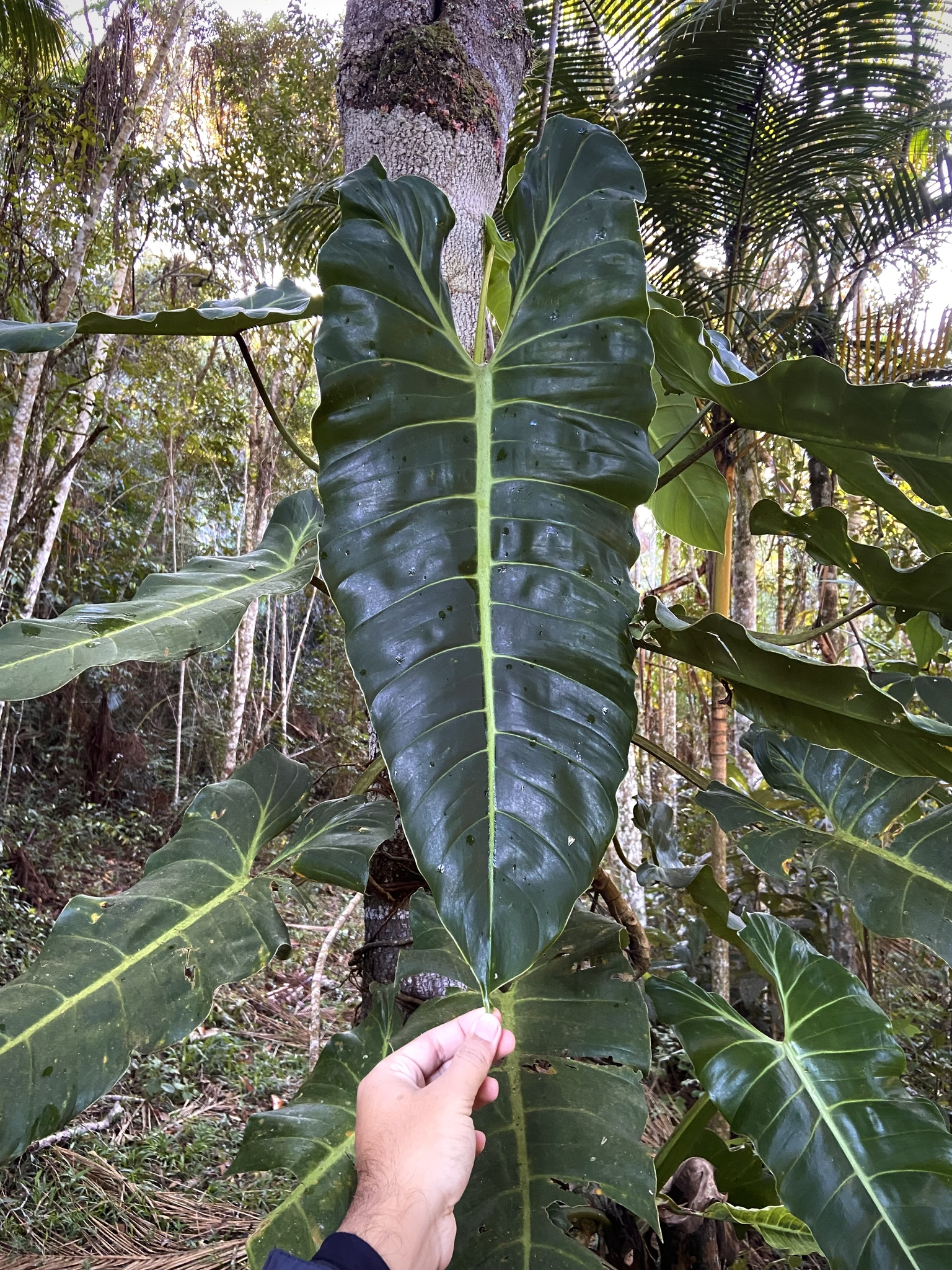

Scientific classification
- Kingdom: Plantae
- Clade: Tracheophytes
- Clade: Angiosperms
- Clade: Monocots
- Order: Alismatales
- Family: Araceae
- Genus: Philodendron
- Species: P. bernardopazii

Binomial name
- Philodendron bernardopazii E.G.Gonç.

= Philodendron bernardopazii =

Species of plant

Philodendron bernardopazii is a species of plant in the genus Philodendron native to Espírito Santo in Brazil. The species is relatively well known in cultivation since originally being grown by Roberto Burle Marx and in Brazilian botanical gardens, but its precise habitat in the wild is not known and thought to be rare. Its common name has historically been "Philodendron Santa Leopoldina" for the village where it has been collected, or "Philodendron superbum" whereas its scientific name refers to Bernardo Paz, founder of Inhotim. A hemiepiphytic member of Philodendron sect. Macrobelium, it is most closely related to Philodendron tenuispadix.

== See also ==
- List of Philodendron species
