= Destricted =

- Poster of the UK release
- Directed by: Marina Abramović; Matthew Barney; Marco Brambilla; Larry Clark; Gaspar Noé; Richard Prince; Sam Taylor-Wood; Marilyn Minter; Cecily Brown; Sante D'Orazio; Tunga
- Written by: Matthew Barney; Richard Prince; Sam Taylor-Wood
- Produced by: Mel Agace; Fredrik Carlström; Mark Fletcher; Andrew Hale; Andrew Herwitz; Igor Kecman; Jelena Mitrović; Sigurjón Sighvatsson; Neville Wakefield
- Starring: see below
- Cinematography: Aleksandar Ilić; Seamus McGarvey; Peter Strietmann; Eric Voake
- Edited by: Alex Blatt; Marco Brambilla; Akiko Iwakawa-Grieve; Michael D. Thomson
- Music by: Jonathan Beblar; Andrew Hale; Matmos; Richard Prince
- Production company: Offhollywood Digital
- Distributed by: Revolver Entertainment
- Release dates: January 2006 (Sundance); 22 May 2006 (Cannes); 15 September 2006 (UK); 2 November 2010 (US)
- Running time: 112 minutes (UK version); 129 minutes (US version)
- Countries: United Kingdom; United States
- Language: English

Destricted is a 2006 anthology film that explores the line where art and pornography intersect. The United Kingdom and United States film releases had overlapping but different short art-house erotic films. The film collection won awards at a range of international film festivals.

== Releases ==
The UK version released in 2006 runs at 114 minutes and includes seven short films:

- Balkan Erotic Epic (Marina Abramović, 14:04) - An erotic comedy about myths from the Balkans about sex organs.
- Sync (Marco Brambilla, 02:15) - Consists of very fast cuts from different porn films.
- Impaled (Larry Clark, 38:28) - A casting for a porn film, but not with the insecure women often displayed; instead, the young men are the insecure ones.
- Death Valley (Sam Taylor-Wood, 08:25) - A man masturbates in the desert.
- House Call (Richard Prince, 12:29) - A vintage sex scene recontextualized with edits and music.
- Hoist (Matthew Barney, 14:38) - A juxtaposition of sexuality and industrial machinery.
- We Fuck Alone (Gaspar Noé, 23:31) - A man and a woman masturbate to the same porn film in different rooms.

The US version (2010) runs at 129 minutes and includes eight shorts, four from the earlier plus four new ones: Marilyn Minter's Green Pink Caviar, Cecily Brown's Four Letter Heaven, Clark's Impaled, Noé's We Fuck Alone, Prince's House Call, Sante D'Orazio's Scratch This and Tunga's Cooking. It excludes Balkan Erotic Epic, Sync and Death Valley.

== Reception ==
Upon release Destricted received a negative to mixed reception from critics, on Rotten Tomatoes the film has an approval rating of 17% out of 12 critics, with an average score of 4.80/10.

== Cast ==
Impaled

- Daniel as himself
- August as herself
- Jasmine Byrne as herself
- Destiny Deville (uncredited) as herself
- Dillan Lauren as herself
- Sativa Rose as herself
- Angela Stone as herself
- Nancy Vee as herself

House Call

- Kora Reed as the Patient
- John Saint John as the Doctor

Hoist

- Vincente Pinho Neto as Blooming Greenman

Death Valley

- Chris Raines

We Fuck Alone

- Shirin Barthel
- Richard Blondel
- Manuel Ferrara
- Katsuni
