= Tunga (artist) =

Brazilian sculptor and performance artist

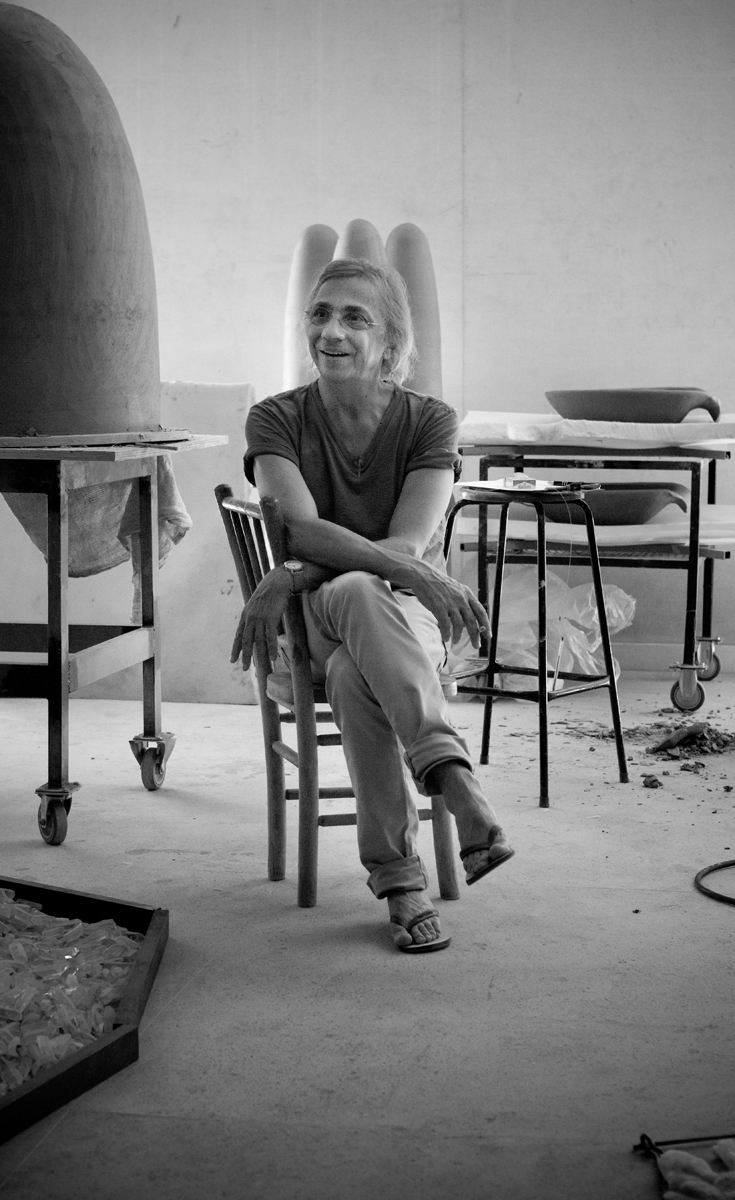
- Born: February 8, 1952; Palmares, Pernambuco, Brazil
- Died: June 6, 2016; Rio de Janeiro, Brazil
- Known for: Installation art, sculpture, performance, drawing
- Website: www.tungaoficial.com.br/en/

Antonio José de Barros Carvalho e Mello Mourão (February 8, 1952 – June 6, 2016), known professionally as Tunga, was a Brazilian sculptor and performance artist. Tunga was born in Palmares, Pernambuco, Brazil.

== Career ==
The Art Newspaper called him "One of Brazil's best-known contemporary artists." As early as he became aware of Brazilian modernism in 1970, he began his career by making sculptures and drawings.

In 1974 he completed a course in architecture and urbanism at Santa Ursula University, in Rio de Janeiro.

In 2005, Tunga became the first contemporary artist to exhibit his work at the Louvre in the museum's history during an installation called "A la Lumiere des Deux Mondes" ("The Meeting of Two Worlds"). One of Tunga's favorite practices was drawing, and he made his first solo show in 1974 at Museum of Modern Art, Rio de Janeiro entirely dedicated to this medium.

He died in Rio de Janeiro on June 6, 2016, at the age of 64, of cancer.

== Collections (selection) ==
The artwork of Tunga is featured in the permanent collections of museums and institutions around the world. These include the Museum of Modern Art in New York, the Art Institute of Chicago, the Museum of Contemporary Art in Los Angeles, the Museum of Fine Arts in Houston, Pérez Art Museum Miami, Tate Modern in London, Museo Nacional Centro de Arte Reina Sofía in Madrid, Moderna Museet in Stockholm, Museu de Arte Moderna de São Paulo, Pinacoteca do Estado de São Paulo, and the Instituto de Arte Contemporânea Inhotim in Brumadinho, which features two major pavilions permanently dedicated to his work.

In Inhotim, Tunga's work has been presented alongside international artists Olafur Eliasson, Hélio Oiticica, Adriana Varejão, and Rivane Neuenschwander, among others. Some private collections also display his works, such as the V+R Sapoznik Art Collection.

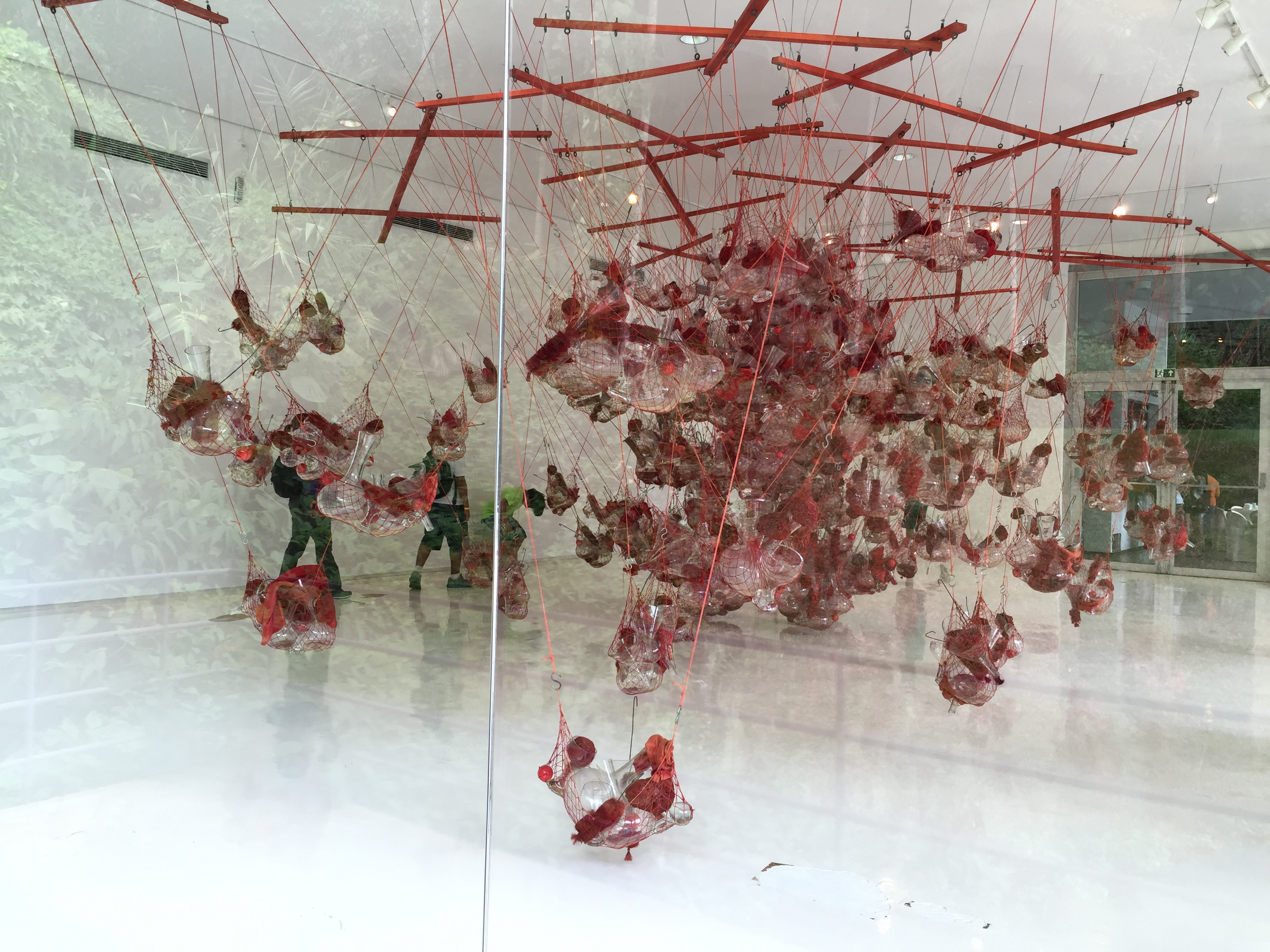
Internal view of Tunga's gallery in Inhotim, Belo Horizonte, Brazil

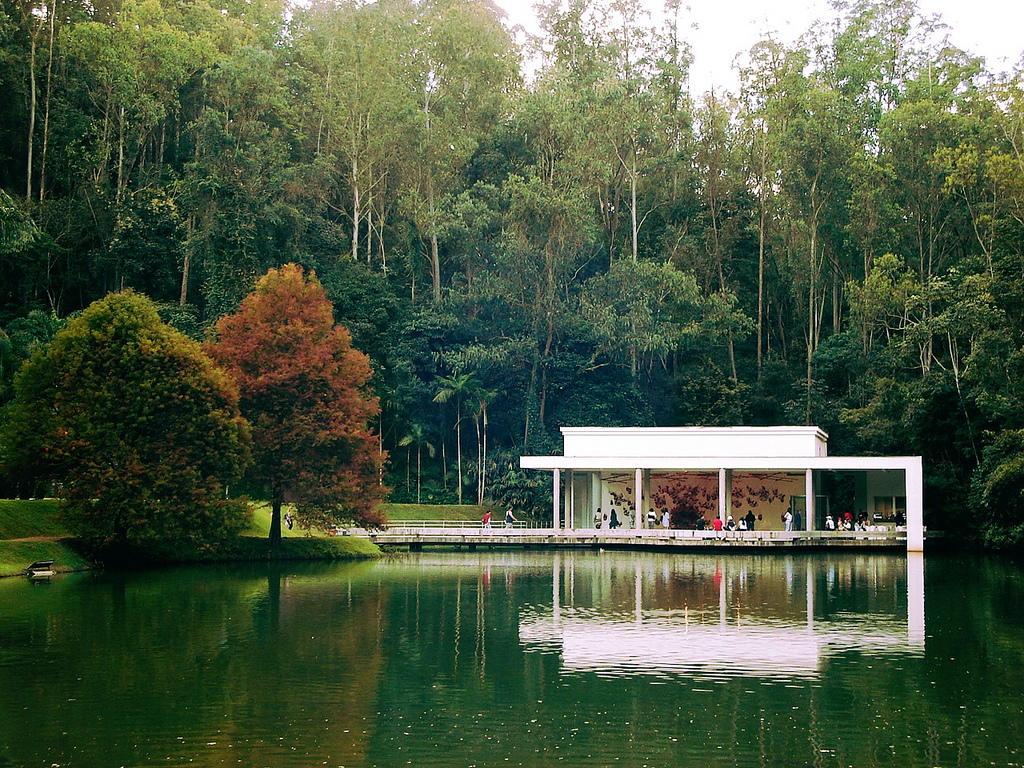
View of Tunga's gallery in Inhotim, Brazil
