= Marco Brambilla =

Italian-Canadian director

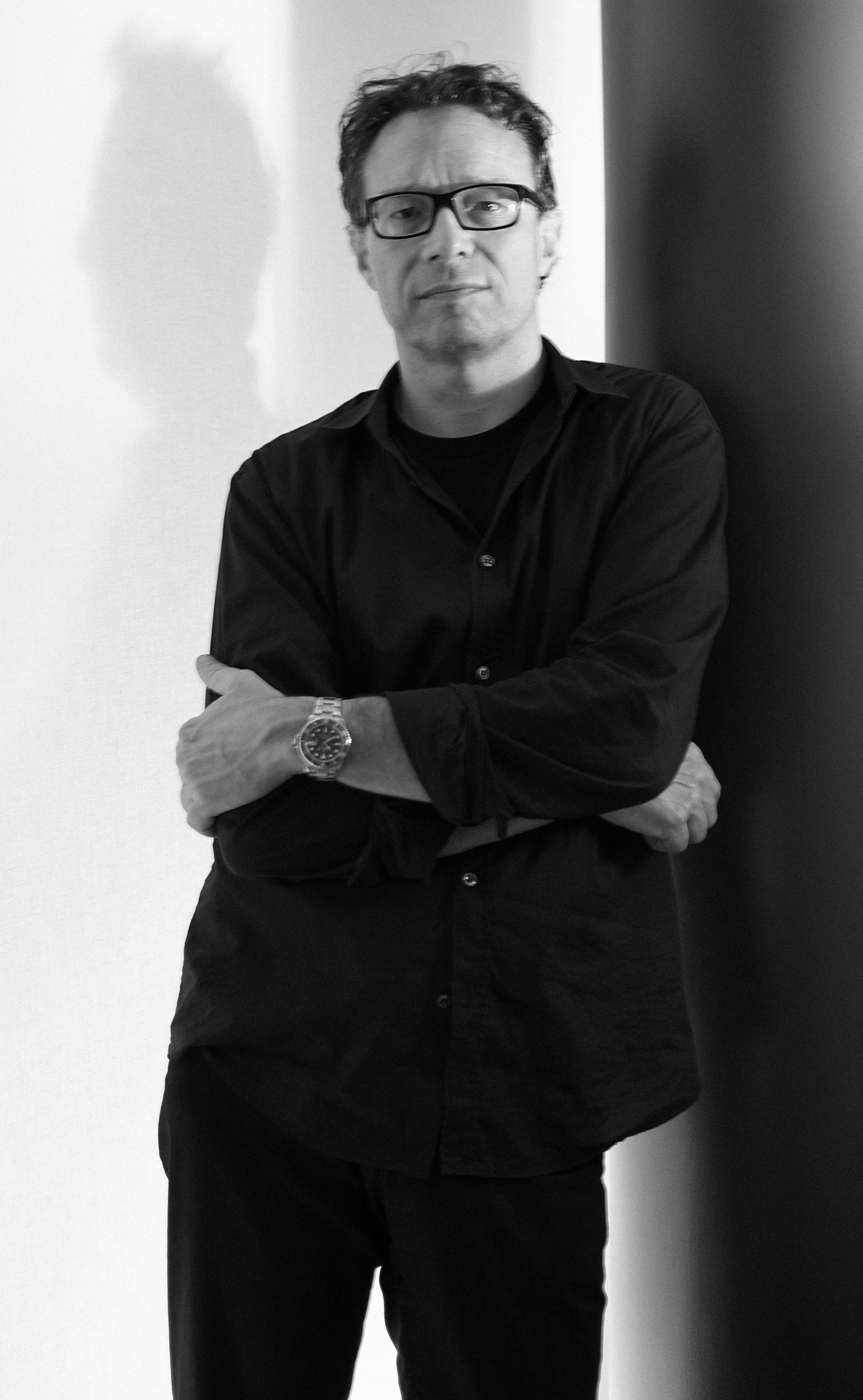
- Born: 25 September 1960 (age 66); Milan, Italy
- Known for: Video artist Filmmaker
- Awards: The Louis Comfort Tiffany Foundation
- Website: marcobrambilla.com

Marco Brambilla (born 25 September 1960) is an Italian-born Canadian contemporary artist and film director, known for directing the film Demolition Man and episodes of the TV series Dinotopia as well as re-contextualizations of popular and found imagery, and use of 3D imaging technologies in public installations and video art.

His work is in the collections of the Museum of Modern Art, New York; Solomon R. Guggenheim Museum, New York; SFMOMA, San Francisco; Borusan Contemporary, Istanbul; the Museum of the Moving Image, New York; Metronóm Foundation for Contemporary Arts, Barcelona, Spain and the Corcoran Gallery of Art, Washington D.C.

== Career ==
=== Style and themes ===
==== Pop culture as spectacle ====
Jumping off from his experience in Hollywood filmmaking, Brambilla's work explores the history and influence of pop culture through the lens of Guy Debord's "spectacle," or how images commodify human experiences by oversaturation.

In an interview with 032c, Brambilla discussed how Hollywood film has "largely become an exercise in spectacle," hyper-saturating the media landscape with pop-culture imagery. In doing so, his work comments on "our ability to absorb images, our ability to be distracted, our ability to be entertained - our ability to be confronted with all those things simultaneously."

While the theme of pop culture as spectacle is particularly prominent in his Megaplex series — using scenes, characters and images from films to create elaborate "video collages" — his work broadly deals with "transition, our culture's constant acceleration and emotional connection and disconnection through technology." In this respect, Brambilla satirizes mass media, which "can be interpreted as apocalyptic or Utopian in nature."

==== Metaverse ====
Marco Brambilla has explored the concept of the Metaverse, whose term was coined by Neal Stephenson in Snow Crash. Brambilla's work, Halflife, juxtaposes gamers in cyber-cafés with their virtual Counter-Strike world, referencing concepts from Stephenson and Jean Baudrillard on hyperreality. In 2016, he adapted part of his Megaplex series into virtual reality (VR), emphasizing it as a medium of immersive, emotional experience. Another VR adaptation was Heaven's Gate, presented at the Pérez Art Museum Miami in 2021. Brambilla has likened the Metaverse to the disruptive Dada movement, and in 2021 curated an NFT collection by Simon Denny, Rachel Rossin, and Willem de Rooij, combining Sculpture, VR, and Blockchain technology.

=== Artwork ===
==== Megaplex series ====
Brambilla's Megaplex is his first series of virtual reality artworks, set between the birth and death of the universe and all that pop culture created during its existence. Each piece explores with the idea of hyper-saturation in media and film as a spectacle.

In May 2011, Brambilla's Megaplex series was part of his first major retrospective at the Santa Monica Museum of Art, featuring eight other works produced since 1999.

In 2024 and 2025, Brambilla presented Double Feature, an exhibition showcasing Civilization (2008) and Heaven’s Gate (2022), part of his Megaplex series at Fotografiska Berlin, Fotografiska Shanghai, and Fotografiska Stockholm.

===== Civilization (2008) =====
Civilization (2008) depicts hundreds of characters and scenes sampled from Hollywood cinema, populating a vertical scroll depicting an endlessly ascending journey from hell to heaven. This religious-themed tableau contains three distinct visual environments offering a pop-culture reinvention of the volcanic landscape of Hades and the lofty clouds of Heaven. Civilization was presented at Toronto International Film Festival and the Fondation Beyeler in Basel, Switzerland.

It was a permanent installation at The Standard in New York City until 2021 when it was replaced with Heaven's Gate, the latest of Brambilla's Megaplex series.

===== Evolution (2010) =====
Evolution illustrates the history of humankind in a vast side-scrolling video mural depicting the spectacle of human conflict across time through the lens of cinema. Evolution was part of the "Official Selection" at the 68th Venice International Film Festival in 2011 and the Sundance Film Festival in 2012.

===== Creation (2012) =====
Set between the birth and death of the universe, Creation presents an abstract cycle of life, depicted within spiraling DNA strands in the form of a cosmic pull back. The big bang is followed by embryonic inception, an idyllic Garden of Eden, then decadent urban sprawls eventually giving way to a landscape of annihilation before reconstituting itself as the spiral loops back to the moment of origin. Creation was presented at Fondation Beyeler in 2015, SITE in Santa Fe, New Mexico, as well as inside St. Patrick's Old Cathedral in New York City.

===== Heaven's Gate (2021) =====
The title alludes to Michael Cimino’s 1980 film of the same name, whose extravagant production costs bankrupted United Artists, opening the path for a new and lasting era of studio domination of the medium, which has continued to prevail.

In May 2021, Heaven's Gate premiered at The Shed, Hudson Yards, New York City. Heaven's Gate was a major exhibition at the Pérez Art Museum Miami, which opened in June 2021. In October 2021, Heaven's Gate replaced the permanent installation of Civilization (Megaplex) at The Standard in New York City.

==== Public installations ====
In 2001, Brambilla was commissioned by Creative Time to present on the Jumbotron screen in Times Square, New York City, titled Superstar. Inspired by Yves Klein’s photograph Leap into the Void (1960), Superstar presents a subject appearing perpetually frozen in time while the document of the moment itself slowly descends. Filmed in a pre-Matrix era, the performance in Superstar was captured with 180 cameras mounted in a 360-degree ring that show a 1/500 second wedge of time.

In 2013, as part of the Art Production Fund, Brambilla presented his site-specific video installation at Time Warner Center titled Anthropocene, which uses LiDAR scanning technologies to track the terrain from the southwest corner to the northeast corner of New York's Central Park, displayed on two intersecting cinematic channels. In March 2015, he presented Apollo XVIII at Times Square – a video-installation of countdown to a fictitious flight to the Moon using archival footage from real NASA missions and computer-generated imagery.

In 2019, Creative Time and Art Production Fund commissioned Brambilla to create Nude Descending a Staircase No.3, which was screened at World Trade Center station. Nude Descending a Staircase No.3 reimagines the iconic Marcel Duchamp painting, Nude Descending a Staircase No. 2, into the dimension of time using machine-learning technology. The installation was also at the Biennale Némo in Paris, France, as well as the Maison Margiela stores in SoHo, New York, and Miami, Florida.

In the same year, Brambilla created an art-video backdrop for the opera Pelléas et Mélisande by Claude Debussy at the Opera Vlaanderen – a collaborative performance piece with artists Marina Abramović, Damien Jalet, Sidi Larbi Cherkaoui, and Iris van Herpen. The backdrop was created using archival footage from NASA to "create a 'symbolist' journey through the cosmos which unfolds onstage."

In 2020, Brambilla also produced the "visual intermezzos" for Abramović's opera 7 Deaths of Maria Callas. Inspired by cloud tank photography used in films like Kwaidan, 2001: A Space Odyssey and Breaking The Waves, Brambilla employed particle simulations to create impressionistic yet hyper-realistic skies that "set the tone for aria Callas’ psychological condition, or her characters in the seven different operas she played in. Each intermezzo represented a specific state of mind as she reached the end of her life."

==== Other projects ====
In 2010, Brambilla was commissioned by Kanye West to direct his music video for 'Power'. In an interview with Vulture, he described the work as a "video portrait of Kanye," depicted in a reinvention of a neoclassical painting. During the same year, he directed a trailer for the third-person shooter Spec Ops: The Line, developed by Yager Development. In 2020, Brambilla created The Four Temperaments where Cate Blanchett performs four sets of distinct character types divided according to a personality classification first defined by the Greek philosopher, Galen. In November 2021, The Four Temperaments was part of a group exhibition on augmented reality at the Phi Centre in Montreal, Quebec.

During the same year, he also participated in the group-show Terminal in City Gallery Wellington, New Zealand, with his video installation Approach (1999). Filmed at John F. Kennedy Airport, passengers arriving from long-haul flights enter the terminal looking for contact with someone familiar. The footage was shot on camcorders equipped with telephoto lenses and slowed down to emphasize the moment of transition that each subject experiences as they arrive. Similarly to Approach, Transit, a collection of photographs Brambilla took in and around airports, was published by Booth-Clibborn Editions in 2000.

=== Film ===
==== "Sync," Destricted ====
His short film Sync (2005) was screened at the 2006 Cannes Film Festival and at the Sundance Film Festival as part of film anthology Destricted. Sync is Brambilla’s first sampled video work and is a reflection of the rising threshold to graphic sex and brutality in contemporary popular culture and film.

==== Demolition Man ====
Brambilla made his directorial debut with the futuristic action film Demolition Man, premiered October 8, 1993, starring Sylvester Stallone, Wesley Snipes and Sandra Bullock. The film debuted at No. 1 on the box office. and grossed $58,055,768 by the end of its box office run in North America and $159,055,768 worldwide.

== Awards and recognition ==
Brambilla received the Tiffany Comfort Foundation Award for Film and Video in 2002 and the Colbert Foundation award in 2000.

== Selected projects ==
- Heaven's Gate, 2021, single-channel 8K video installation
- Creation (Megaplex), 2020, single-channel high-definition video installation
- "The Seven Deaths of Maria Callas", 2020, visual intermezzos for Marina Abramović's opera
- "Pelléas et Mélisande (opera)", 2019
- Nude Descending A Staircase No. 3, 2019, 3-channel high-definition video installation
- The Master Builder, 2019, single-channel 3D video installation
- Lunar Atlas, 2016, multi-channel high-definition video installation
- Crystal Observatory, 2015, high-definition video installation
- Constellation, 2015, high-definition video projection
- Apollo XVII, 2015, 4K ultra-high definition, dual-screen video tile display in custom enclosure
- Echo, 2014, ultra high-definition video installation
- Anthropocene, 2013, 3-channel video installation
- Creation (Megaplex), 2012, single-channel high-definition video installation. Collection Borusan Contemporary, Istanbul
- Civilization (Megaplex) 3-D, 2011, single-channel high-definition video installation. Collection Borusan Contemporary, Istanbul
- Evolution (Megaplex) 3-D, 2010, single-channel high-definition video installation. Collection Albright-Knox Art Gallery, Buffalo and Borusan Contemporary, Istanbul
- Civilization (Megaplex), 2008, single-channel high-definition video installation
- "Power", 2010, music video performed by Kanye West. Collection Museum of Moving Image, New York
- Cathedral, 2007, single-channel high-definition video installation
- Sync, 2005, 3-channel video installation
- Half-Life, 2002, 3-channel video installation
- Wall of Death, 2001, single-channel video installation. Collection Museum of Modern Art (MOMA), New York
- Approach, 1999, 4-channel video installation suspended in custom enclosures with ceiling mounts. Collection Corcoran Gallery of Art, Washington D.C.
- Getaway, 1999, single-channel video installation
- Cyclorama, 1999, 9-channel video installation. Collection San Francisco Museum of Modern Art (SFMOMA)

== Filmography ==
- Demolition Man (1993)
- Excess Baggage (1997)
- Dinotopia (2002)
- Destricted (segment "Sync") (2006)
