= Rivane Neuenschwander =

Brazilian artist (born 1967)

- Born: 1967; Belo Horizonte, Minas Gerais, Brazil
- Education: Royal College of Art (MFA, 1998); Federal University of Minas Gerais (BFA, 1993)
- Known for: Installation art, Painting, Video art, Participatory art

Rivane Neuenschwander (born 1967) is a Brazilian artist. She is known for work that explores language, nature, geography, the passing of time and social interactions. At times her works are interactive, involving viewers in spontaneous and participatory actions. In her installations, films and photographs, Rivane Neuenschwander employs fragile unassuming materials to create aesthetic experiences, a process she describes as "ethereal materialism". While her work in the 1990s focused mainly on various forms of mapping and the use of "simple, ephemeral materials familiar to people living in Brazil" such as garlic peels, ants, dried flowers, soap bubbles, spice, dust, coconut soap, water, and slugs, her more recent works have dealt more directly with politics, sexuality, and subjectivity, particularly as an expression of the "pain and indignation that accompanies life in Brazil" under the government of Jair Bolsonaro.

== Early life and education ==
Neuenschwander was born in 1967 in Belo Horizonte, Minas Gerais. She graduated from the Federal University of Minas Gerais in 1993 and completed her MFA at the Royal College of Art in London 1998. After graduation she traveled to Italy, Germany, Spain and Sweden. She is the sister of Sergio Neuenschwander, with whom she collaborates. She is of Swiss descent. She lives in Brazil.

== Work ==
In 2004, she was short-listed for the Hugo Boss Prize. In 2013 she received the Yanghyun Prize.

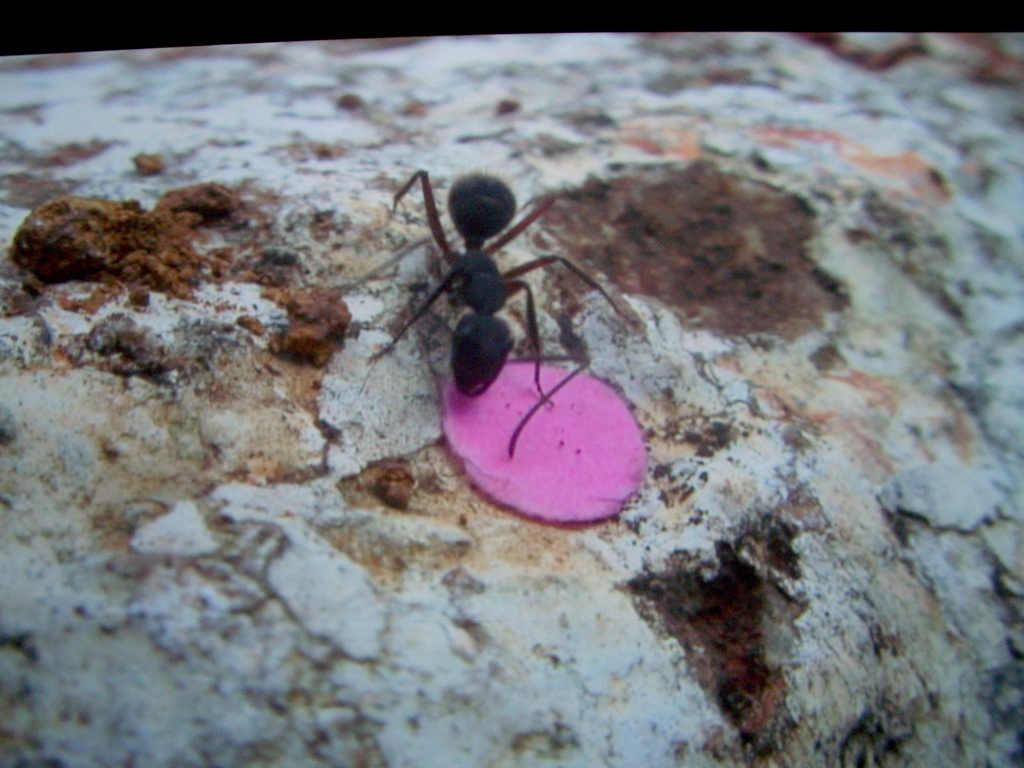
still image from Quarta-Feira de Cinzas-Epilogue (Ash Wednesday), Rivane Neuenschwander with Cao Guimarães (2006)

Neuenschwander has exhibited her work internationally throughout the past twenty years. In 2010, the New Museum in New York presented Rivane Neuenschwander: A Day Like Any Other, a survey exhibition that traveled to the Mildred Lane Kemper Art Museum in St. Louis, followed by the Scottsdale Museum of Contemporary Art in Arizona, Miami Art Museum, and the Irish Museum of Modern Art in Dublin through 2012.

She has participated in the 2008 Carnegie International, the 1997 Istanbul Biennial, the 1998, 2006, and 2008 São Paulo Art Biennial, and the 2003 and 2005 Venice Biennale.

Her work Watchword was included in the group show Playtime at Peabody Essex Museum, Salem in Massachusetts in 2018. In 2020, Rivane Neuenschwander had presentations at MoMA, New York and Tanya Bonakdar Gallery. Neuenschwander embark on the 15 Seconds public art project, initiative organized by Inhotim, which exhibited her work in bus stops around the city of Belo Horizonte, Brazil, in 2021. In 2022, the Institute of Contemporary Art, Boston featured one of her video installation works in To Begin Again: Artists and Childhood.

The Pérez Art Museum Miami is presenting Quarta-Feira de Cinzas (Ash Wednesday) (2006) for PAMMTV's 2024 programming showcasing the museum's video art collection as part of The Days That Build Us group exhibition. In tandem, the Institute of Contemporary Art, Boston is presenting the participatory installation Zé Carioca e amigos (Um festival embananado) / Joe Carioca and Friends (The Festival Went Bananas) (2005) in the exhibition Wordplay, about the relationship between visual arts and language.

== Collections ==
Neuenschwander's work is included in international collections in Latin America, the United States, and Europe such as Inhotim Institute, Minas Gerais; Pérez Art Museum Miami, Florida; Institute of Contemporary Art, Boston, Massachusetts; the Museum of Modern Art, New York; Solomon R. Guggenheim Museum, New York; Kadist, San Francisco; Tate, London; among others.
