= Commonwealth and Council =

Los Angeles art gallery

Coordinates: 34.0597°N 118.2893°W

Commonwealth and Council is an American contemporary art gallery located in Koreatown, Los Angeles.

== History ==
The gallery was founded in 2010 by artist and curator Young Chung. It began in his apartment on Commonwealth Avenue and Council Street in Historic Filipinotown, where it operated as an informal residency program for emerging artists and a gallery during weekends. The influx of visitors forced Chung to relocate the gallery to its current location Koreatown in 2011, but the gallery kept the name derived from its former address. In 2016, W Magazine named it one of "The Best Alternative Art Galleries in Los Angeles." In 2018, art lawyer and writer Kibum Kim joined the gallery as co-director.

Commonwealth and Council shares a building with the project space Visitor Welcome Center.

Commonwealth and Council began to represent artists formally in 2016.
