= Adriana Varejão =

Brazilian artist

- Born: 1964 (age 61–62); Rio de Janeiro, Brazil
- Website: www.adrianavarejao.net

Adriana Varejão (born 1964, Rio de Janeiro) is a Brazilian artist. She works in various disciplines including painting, drawing, sculpture, installation and photography. She was an artist-in-resident at the Isabella Stewart Gardner Museum in 2004. Varejão lives and works in Rio de Janeiro.

== Background ==
In the 1980s, Varejão was an engineering student. However, it was thanks to a bohemian artist Elizabeth Taylor's performance in The Sandpiper (1965) that she decided to also pursue a career in art. She then quit university and achieved global recognition as a well established contemporary artist. Varejão appropriates stylistic traditions that were introduced to Brazil upon colonial encounter. Since Brazil is one of the most ethnically diverse countries in the world, it has undoubtedly informed her style as an artist. Over the course of her 30-year career, Varejão has created a number of series which represent the identity, culture and race, and by implication, also the construction of her own identity. Her work is now included in numerous collections worldwide, some of which are the Solomon R. Guggenheim Museum in New York, the Tate Modern in London, and the Museum of Contemporary Art San Diego, among others. In her January 2016 interview with Ocula Magazine, the discussion about art as a way of being in the world is brought up, she says, 'It's a collective way of seeing the world, not individual. It's a point of view that's inserted within a culture. It's sociological.'

Varejão attended the Escola de Artes Visuais do Parque Lage from 1983 to 1985. In 1986 she started to work with the medium of oil painting, recreating in thick impasto the ornate Baroque frescoes and religious relics of the eighteenth-century churches in Ouro Preto, Minas Gerais, Brazil. In 1992, Varejão spent three months traveling in China, where she was able to learn Song dynasty (960–1279 CE) ceramics and classical Chinese landscape painting. She then began to realize how European narratives were altering pieces of history that were told through art, which signaled the start of a series of subversions of well known imageries disrupted by bloody gashes and fleshy extrusions. Her work from this period demonstrates the violence and eroticism of Brazilian history in relation to antropofagia, a key concept in Brazilian modernism that reclaims the rituals of the Tupi people, transforming the taboo of cannibalism into a symbolic totem of cultural absorption in postcolonial Brazil.

In 1999, she uses a similar approach where her works suggest that familiar spaces are haunted by violent specters through freestanding sculptures that represent in a way the spatial drama of the Baroque. In 2001, she continues the theme of hidden mysteries with The Saunas and Baths series where tiled interiors painted in intricate monochromatic gradations appear to be psychologically charged. In these complex labyrinths, light beams from an imperceptible source and traces of the human body appear, in the form of stray hairs or blood.In recent years, Varejão has developed an interest in the culture of pre-Hispanic, colonial, and modern Mexico.In September 2017, the exhibition Queermuseu in Porto Alegre, Brazil, featuring works like Adriana Varejão's "Cena de interior II," was prematurely shut down due to conservative backlash with Varejão's piece, depicting the violent colonial history of Brazil, misinterpreted as promoting inappropriate content, leading to protests and accusations against the artist. In January 2017, she visited the Museo Amparo in Puebla to study local talavera and cholula polychrome pottery. Her following engagement with talavera, has catalyzed a new direction in her paintings in which the clean shapes and bright hues of hard-edge abstraction are brought into dialogue with pre-Hispanic artisanal forebears. Through this intersection of time, culture, and place, Varejão brings light to the parallels between aesthetic systems and raises crucial questions about the life of forms in art.

The artist however, only became popular in the late 1990s with her provocative paintings involving elements from traditional Portuguese ceramic tiles, azulejos. Her tile work demonstrates coldly beautiful spa settings that invoke the feel of cracks beneath the beautiful surface. She utilizes color and shadow to create hints of hidden mysteries in her pieces, and this is especially common in multiple of her 2004 tile creations. The mystery also tends to be caused by the discord between the titles of her works—A Diva (The Diva), O Sedutor (The Seducer), O Obsceno (The Obscene), and O Obsessivo (The Obsessive) — and the minimalist styles that she used for those art pieces. Varejao's work could be found in the Brazil - Body & Soul exhibition at the Solomon R. Guggenheim Museum in New York, in solo exhibits in museums internationally, including the Victoria Miro Gallery in London, the Lehmann Maupin Gallery in New York, the Hara Museum of Contemporary Art in Tokyo, and the Soledad Lorenzo in Madrid. As of now, several museums feature her work in their long-term and permanent collections, including the Tate Museum in London, the Solomon R. Guggenheim Museum in New York, and the Museum of Contemporary Art in San Diego. In 2008, Centro de Arte Contemporaneo Inhotim in Brazil created a permanent pavilion to display Varejao's artwork.

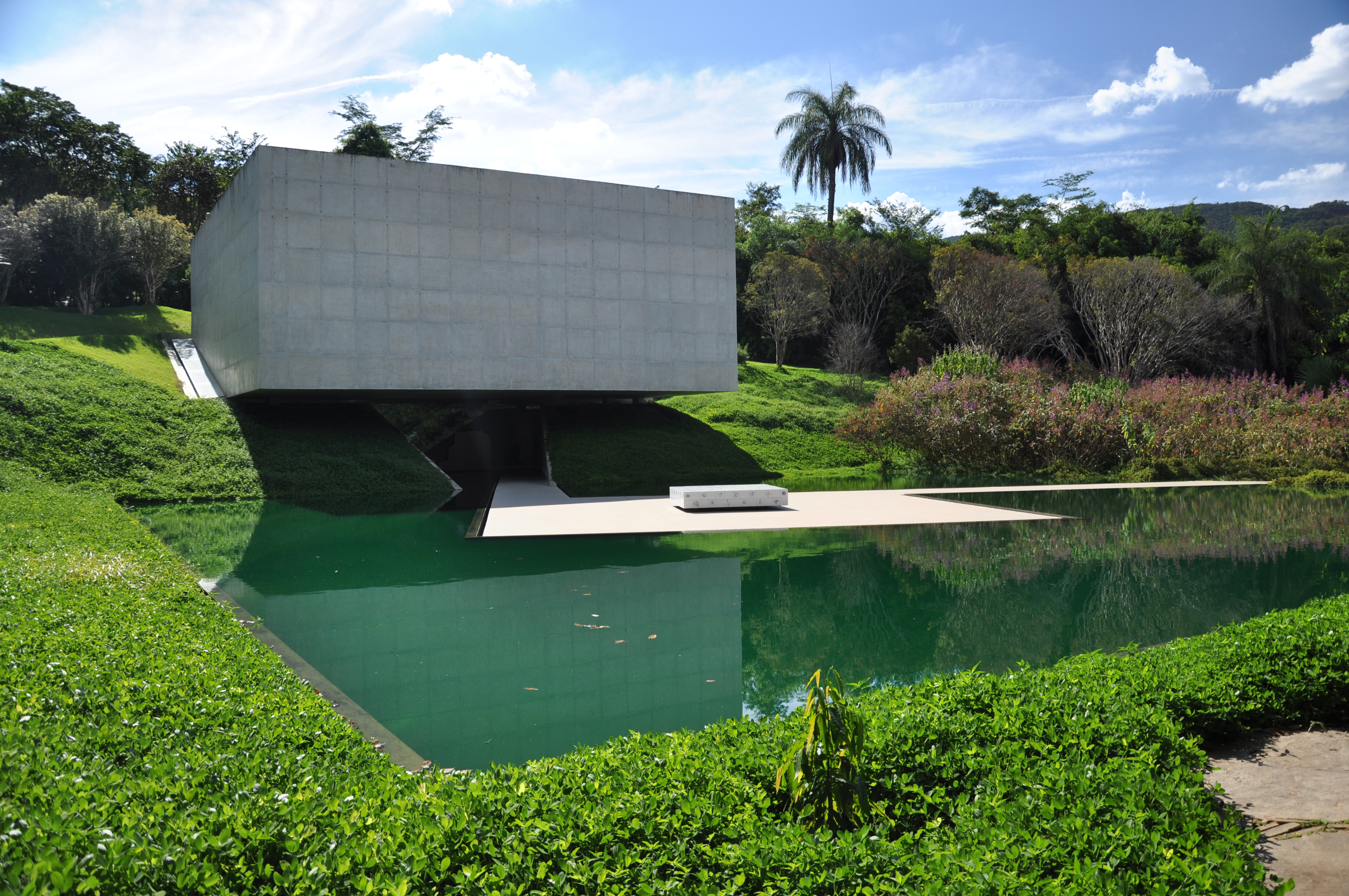
Adriana Varejão, Panacea Phantastica, 2003 – 2008, at Inhotim, Brazil

== Influences ==
References to the effects of colonialism of Brazil by Europe, are apparent in her work as well as art history and illusion. Her work alludes to expansion and transformation of cultural identity, yet continues the use of her theme of understanding the past, in order to understand the present. Her artistic style of layering paint evokes a metaphorical retelling and reimagination of Brazil's history in relation to Portugal and Europe.

Cultural anthropophagy, or the process of absorbing and incorporating foreign influence into native Brazilian culture, inspires much of Varejão's work. This movement is evident throughout Brazil's history into the present and the dichotomy of diversity and unity is a common theme amongst contemporary Brazilian artists. In Varejão's works, she examines this theme within the contexts of race, body, identity, and the effects of colonialism.

== Media ==
Drawing upon tensions surrounding race and ethnicity in Brazil, Varejão uses installation, oil painting, and drawing to comment on the perception of race in Brazil in the twenty-first century. She often starts with a canvas, adding materials such as porcelain and ceramics. In her work entitled Polvo, exhibited at Lehman Maupin in 2014, Varejão combines color theory and casta (a social theory that influenced European paintings of Brazil's conquest), to examine the norm of defining race in terms of skin color. The series of nearly identical self-portraits forming the bulk of the work were displayed with individualized titles that explained the portraits’ only differences: the titles were generated by the 1976 Brazilian census, which asked Brazilians for the first time to give their definitions of their own skin tone; the responses ranged from branquinha, “snow-white,” to morenão, roughly “big black dude.” Varejão provided the entranceway mural Cores Polvo in 2019 as a piece commissioned by Sesc Guarulhos, which dialogues with the 1976 Brazilian census on race and identity.

Many of Varejão's works appropriate the use of azulejos, traditional Portuguese blue tiles, and maps to comment on colonial legacies in Brazil. Employment of azulejos in Brazilian art is both transcultural and transmedial, directly linking Portugal's historical colonial influence to aspects of contemporary Brazilian society. The piece Proposal for a Catechesis: Part I Diptych: Death and Dismemberment (1993), for example, incorporates azulejos to evoke anthropophagy, a style of cultural cannibalism that was fundamental to the Brazilian modernist movement. Explicit references to artistic takes on anthropophagy are depicted in the series Tongues and Incisions (1997-2003) and Jerked Beef Ruins (2000-2004), among others, which draw attention to the tongue as a symbol for taste (cannibalism) and site of speech to critique colonial history. Varejão's use of skin-tone color pallettes and visceral textured painting techniques evokes the body and the mark of historical violence on it even when no body is explicitly portrayed.

== Works ==
=== Selected works ===
Several of Varejão's sculptural installations, including “Linda da Lapa”, “Folds”, and “Ruina de Charque - Nova Capela (Nova Capela Jerked-Beef Ruin),” juxtapose structural uniformity and stability against human destruction. These artworks consist of bisected azulejos-covered walls filled with human organs. Using these images, Varejão comments on postcolonial Brazilian social structure and implies that colonially influenced order is built upon human destruction and violence.

Varejão created art that was on the exterior of the Olympic Aquatics Stadium, a temporary structure in which the swimming events of the 2016 Summer Olympics were held.

=== Collections ===
One of the artist's largest projects to date recently opened at Inhotim Centro de Arte Contemporânea, Brazil - a specially commissioned pavilion designed in collaboration with architect Rodrigeo Cervino Lopez. Her work is included in numerous collections worldwide, some of which are the Solomon R. Guggenheim Museum in New York, the Tate Modern in London, and the Museum of Contemporary Art San Diego, among others.

=== Art market ===
Varejão is represented by the Gagosian Gallery in the US, the Victoria Miro Gallery in the UK, and the Fortes D’Aloia & Gabriel in Brazil. She holds the auction record for a Brazilian artist with a $1.8 million sale of Wall With Incisions a la Fontana at Christie's in February 2011.

=== Exhibits ===
The Centro de Arte Contemporânea Inhotim in Brazil opened in 2008 and includes a pavilion dedicated to her work and built by her then husband, collector Bernardo Paz. She was included in the "Brazil: Body and Soul" exhibition at the Guggenheim Museum in New York in 2001, as well as in the MoMA QNS exhibition "Tempo", where she filled an entire room with the wall-based installation Azulejões (Big Blue Tiles). Her work has also been included in the Venice Biennale and Biennale of Sydney. She had solo exhibitions at Lehmann Maupin (2011 forthcoming, 2009, 2003, 1999) in New York, Soledad Lorenzo (2011 forthcoming, 2002, 1998) in Madrid, Victoria Miro Gallery (2011 forthcoming, 2002) in London, Galeria Fortes Vilaca (2009, 2005) in São Paulo, the Hara Museum of Contemporary Art (2007) in Tokyo and the Fondation Cartier pour l’art contemporain (2005) in Paris.

=== Awards ===
- 2008, Chevalier des Arts et Lettres Medal, French Ministry of Culture
- 2011, The Order of Cultural Merit, Cultural Ministry of Brazil
- 2012, Grande Prêmio da Crítica, Associação Paulista de Críticos de Arte
- 2013, Mario Pedrosa Award, Associação Brasileira de Críticos de Arte
