= Bernardo Paz =

Brazilian businessman

- Born: 1949 (age 75–76); Brazil
- Occupation(s): Businessman, art collector

Bernardo Paz is a former mining businessman and creator of Inhotim, an outdoor art complex and botanical garden in Brazil that was once home to his own personal rural estate and art collection. Paz commissioned works by contemporary artists for Inhotim and transformed it into a non-profit cultural institution, open to the public.

In 2018, Paz was sentenced to more than nine years in jail for money laundering. He was cleared of his charges in 2020.
