= Nelson Leirner =

Brazilian artist (1932–2020)

- Born: 1932; São Paulo, Brazil
- Died: March 7, 2020 (aged 88); Rio de Janeiro, Brazil
- Occupation: Artist

Nelson Leirner (1932 – March 7, 2020) was a Brazilian artist. Leirner has participated in several exhibitions in Brazil and abroad. In 1997, he moved to Rio de Janeiro and began teaching at the Escola de Artes Visuais do Parque Lage. He lives and works in Rio de Janeiro.
