= Rubens Gerchman =

Brazilian artist (1942–2008)

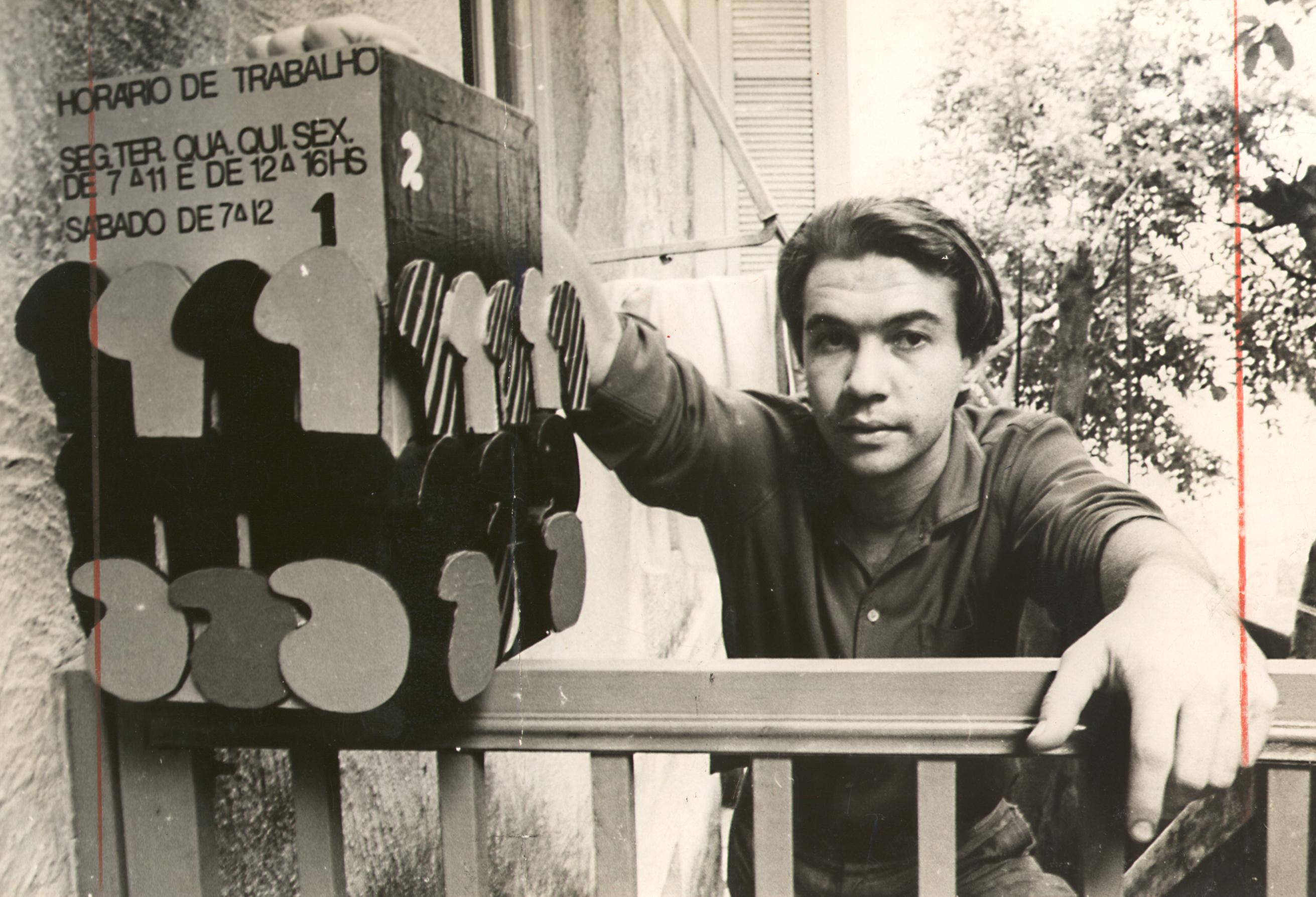
- Born: January 10, 1942; Rio de Janeiro, Brazil
- Died: January 29, 2008 (aged 66)
- Movement: neoconcrete

Rubens Gerchman (January 10, 1942 in Rio de Janeiro – January 29, 2008) was a Brazilian painter and sculptor. He was heavily influenced by concrete and neoconcrete art.

Many of Gerchman's works are paintings based on populist themes and his political beliefs, which followed those of neoconcrete artists. His sculptures with letters, stem from concrete poetry.

== Career ==
Gerchman studied at the Rio de Janeiro School of fine arts. In the 1960s, his work focused on mass culture. He used faces clipped from news photos, but unlike Andy Warhol, who used infamous celebrity, he used images of anonymous individuals. These faces would be reproduced as multiple painted images in a comic-strip style.

In the late 1960s, Gerchman devoted his interest to urban isolation and alienation. He produced boxes and containers destined to be opened by spectators, and made a series of mixed media collages on wood, broadly titled Caixa de morar (Box to Live In), which reflects this theme. One work in this series, O rei do mau gosto (The King of Bad Taste), was a satire on the bourgeoisie and industrial tycoons set in a monstrous tropical paradise.

From the mid-1960s to the early 1970s, Gerchman incorporated letters and words in his paintings, photographs, and sculptures. In 1967, he completed sculptural works which included Terra (Earth), Lute ("Struggle") and Sós ("Alone"). Terra integrated Gerchman's box with hollowed out letters, while Sós played on his Boxes to Live In series with its reference to isolation and alienation. Lastly, Lute expresses political importance.

During his stay in New York City from 1968 to 1973, Gerchman adapted to his new audience by producing works with English words. His new works still reflected Gerchman's populist nature, and are rooted in concrete poetry. Some of his work with letters also addresses issues of Latin America's relative geographic location in the Southern Hemisphere.

== Legacy ==
Gerchman's work in the 1960s influenced the spread of kitsch in Brazilian paintings. His comic-strip inspired a form of pop art in Brazil that was based on people and events.

Works

1. Caixa de Morar (Box to Live In) (1966–1968)
2. O rei do mau gosto (The King of Bad Taste) (1966)
3. Terra (Earth) (1967)
4. Lute (Struggle) (1967)
5. Sos (Alone) (1967)
6. Skyeyeyellow (1970)
7. Spelling Book Project: House (1972)
8. Sinuous Snake (1969)

Museum Exhibitions/Shows

1. Museum of Modern Art in São Paulo
2. Museum of Modern Art and the Museu da Republica in Rio de Janeiro
3. Blanton Museum of Art in Austin, Texas
4. Bronx Museum and El Museo del Barrio in New York
5. São Paulo Biennials (1966, 1982, 1998)
6. "Viva Brasil" show at Galerie 1900–2000 in Paris (1999)
7. "Re-aligning Vision: Alternative Currents in South American Drawing" at the Miami Art Museum (1999)
8. "L'Esthètique du Football" at Galerie Jérôme de Noirmont in Paris (1998)
