= Wesley Duke Lee =

Brazilian painter (1931–2010)

Wesley Duke Lee (December 21, 1931 in São Paulo – September 12, 2010 in São Paulo) was a Brazilian painter.

== Career ==
Lee was a grandson of Americans and Portuguese and started his learning of art in the drawing course of São Paulo Museum of Art, in 1951. In the following year, he moved to the United States to study in the Parsons and in the AIGA, in New York City, until 1955. There he became acquainted with the works of Robert Rauschenberg, Jasper Johns, Cy Twombly and with Pop art in general. Back in Brazil, Lee quit his advertising career and studied painting with Karl Plattner, joining Plattner during a trip to Italy and Austria in 1960. Lee also traveled to Paris, where he attended classes at the Académie de la Grande Chaumière and in the atelier of Johnny Friedlaender.

After returning to Brazil, in 1963, Lee began to work with young artists and performed the happening O Grande Espetáculo das Artes ("The Great Spectacle of Arts" in Portuguese) at the João Sebastião Bar, in São Paulo. That was considered one of the most pioneering happenings in Brazil.

With Maria Cecília, Bernardo Cid, Otto Stupakoff and Pedro Manuel Gismondi, among others, he established a group dedicated to magic realism. In 1966, he joined a group named "Grupo Rex" but it lasted only until 1967.

== Death ==
Lee died on September 12, 2010, in São Paulo, at the age 78, due to pulmonary aspiration and cardiac arrest.
