= Inhotim =

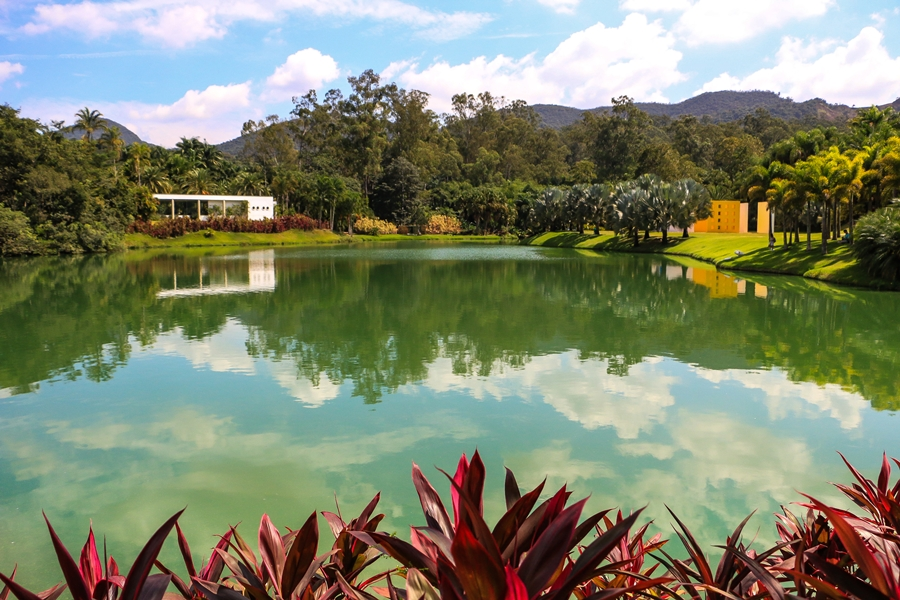
- Inhotim

- Location within Brazil
- Established: 2006
- Location: Brumadinho, Minas Gerais, Brazil
- Coordinates: 20.0728°S 44.1309°W
- Type: Art museum, botanical garden
- Website: www.inhotim.org.br

The Inhotim Institute is a Brazilian contemporary art museum. It is one of the largest outdoor art centers in Latin America. It was founded by the former mining magnate Bernardo Paz in 2004 to house his personal art collection, but opened to the public a couple of years later. In 2014, the open-air museum was one of TripAdvisor's top 25 best-ranked museums in the world.

Located in Brumadinho (Minas Gerais), just 60 km away from Belo Horizonte, the institute has a total area of 1,942.25 acres, mostly located in the biome of the Atlantic Forest. Of the total area, 1,087.26 acres are marked as preservation areas, of which 359 acres are part of the Reserva Particular do Patrimônio Natural RPPN, which makes it a natural heritage site. These geographic features made it possible for Inhotim to house a botanical garden, which has been developing since it was opened.

== Etymology ==
In the 1980s, Paz began buying tracts of land surrounding his modest farmhouse as developers threatened to destroy the natural landscape. The farm had been named by locals after a former owner, an English engineer known as Senhor Tim — Nhô Tim (pronounced [ĩ.ŋõ.tʃˈĩ]) in the Mineiro dialect of Minas Gerais.

== History ==
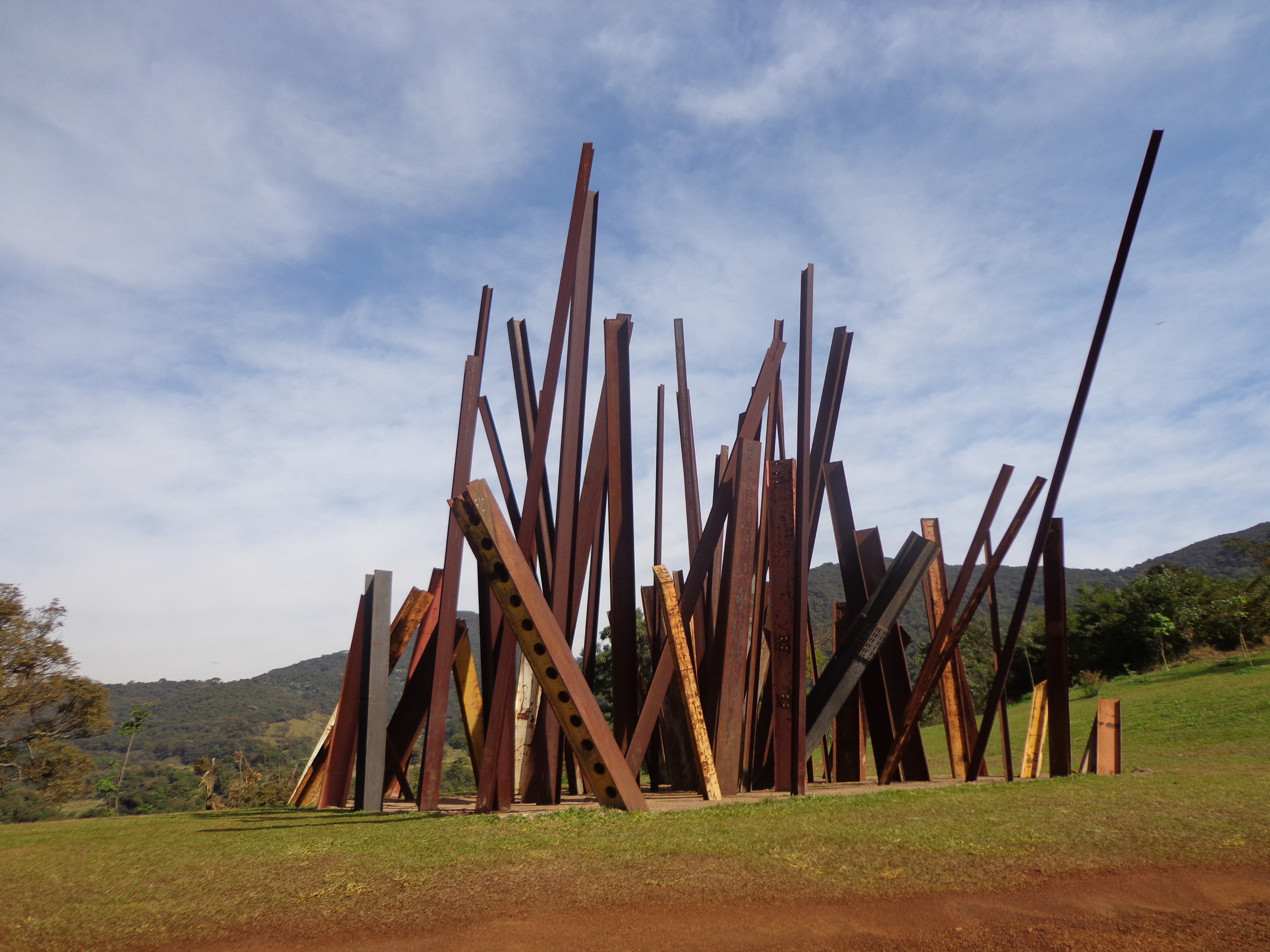
Beam Drop by Chris Burden

Paz soon converted the then 3,000-acre ranch into a sprawling, 5,000-acre botanical garden designed by his friend, the late landscape artist Roberto Burle Marx. The project began when Brazilian contemporary artist Tunga persuaded Paz to start collecting contemporary art. Eventually, he allowed artists all the space and resources they needed to create larger-than-life works. The garden, which boasts two dozen art "pavilions", opened to the public in 2006.

Paz soon became known as the "Emperor of Inhotim." In order to make Inhotim self-sustaining, Paz announced in 2012 plans to build no fewer than 10 new hotels here for visitors, an amphitheater for 15,000 people, and "lofts" for those who want to live amid the collection.

In 2017, Paz was convicted by a Brazilian federal court of money laundering and sentenced to nine years in prison; allegedly, between 2007 and 2008 Paz received more than $98 million related to fund-raising for Inhotim, some of which was diverted to other companies. He was acquitted in 2020, after which he gradually minimised his involvement with the institution.

Shortly before his resignation as chairman of Inhotim's board in 2018, the Minas Gerais government signed an agreement with Paz in which 20 works from its collection would be transferred to government ownership to cover his debts. However, the agreement states that none of the works can be sold or removed from the institution and that Inhotim retains its stewardship of the works.

Between 2021 and 2022, Paz — who previously funded 70% of Inhotim's operational budget — donated Inhotim's grounds, galleries, pavilions and 330 artworks to the institution. Paz also transferred stewardship of Inhotim to a team of well-known figures in the Brazilian and international art worlds, including Lucas Pessôa, Paula Azevedo and Julieta González. Additionally, Inhotim established a 30-member board of trustees, who are involved in the acquisition of new artworks and the development of new pavilions on the site.

In 2023, Inhotim closed an $80 million, ten-year sponsorship agreement with private mining company Vale.

== Pavilions ==
The pavilions include more than 500 works by noted Brazilian and international artists, such as Hélio Oiticica, Yayoi Kusama, Rivane Neuenschwander, Anish Kapoor, Thomas Hirschhorn, Dominique Gonzalez-Foerster, Steve McQueen, Cildo Meireles and Vik Muniz. One pavilion is devoted to one of Paz's ex-wives, the Brazilian artist Adriana Varejão.

- In 2008, a geodesic dome designed by Paula Zasnicoff Cardoso of the Brazilian architectural practice Arquitetos Associados was constructed within a eucalyptus forest and now contains Matthew Barney's installation De Lama Lâmina [From Mud, a Blade] (2004–08), which shows a vehicle uprooting a tree.
- Chris Burden's Beam Drop (1984–2008) is made of 72 steel beams dropped 45 meters from 150-foot-high cranes into a pit filled with wet cement.
- Originally commissioned by the Public Art Fund for Madison Square Park and resold to Inhotim by Marian Goodman, Dan Graham's Bisected triangle, Interior curve (2002) is a two-room, walk-in pavilion made from different kinds of tinted glass, transparent and reflective.
- Sonic Pavilion by Doug Aitken was realized in 2009 and consists of a circular building of frosted glass on top of a hill which contains a well. This goes down 200 meters into the ground and at its bottom microphones capture the sounds of the earth, which are then amplified and played live in the gallery above.
- Vegetation Room (2012) by Cristina Iglesias is a cube of polished stainless steel reflecting the surrounding forest. Visitors slip into crevices where the walls are sculpted foliage, entering a labyrinth within the labyrinth; at the cube's heart, torrents of water periodically rush.
- Originally scheduled to open in 2020, Inhotim unveiled a pavilion in 2023 honouring Yayoi Kusama and featuring Aftermath of Obliteration of Eternity (2009), one of the artist's popular Infinity Rooms. Designed by the architects Fernando Maculan and Maria Paz, it spans more than 15,000 sq. ft and features a lushly planted garden at its main entrance.

== Botanical Garden ==
In 2011, Inhotim joined the Brazilian government's official botanical garden association, and the staff has begun an inventory of its 5,000 plant species, including 1,300 types of palm alone. This represents more than 28% of botanical families known to man, and helped the institution receive the title of Private Reserve of Natural Patrimony of Inhotim (RPPN).

Inhotim Institute is the only place in Latin America that has the Carrion flower, a species native to Asia and famous for being the biggest flower in the world. It is also known for the strong odor it releases when blooming, which has given it the alternative name of "corpse flower". In Inhotim, it bloomed for the first time on December 15, 2010, and again on December 27, 2012. The flower is located in the "Viveiro Educador", in the Equatorial Greenhouse, and is open for visitation by the public.

== Management ==
In 2008, Inhotim's status was changed from a private museum to a public institute, with an annual budget and a board of directors. Although the plan is for the place eventually to be self-funding, at the moment it is largely financed by Paz. Inhotim costs about $10 million to run a year, with about 15% of this coming from ticket receipts.

Jochen Volz has been the artistic director since 2004. Paz has plans to expand Inhotim with ten or more new hotels, a 15,000-capacity amphitheater, and even a complex of "lofts" for those who want to live amid the collection.

== Attendance ==
Inhotim has experienced a significant rise in attendance since it opened to the public in 2006, with around 133,000 visitors in 2009, nearly 250,000 visitors in 2011 and 300,000 visitors in 2023. In August 2018, they reached the mark of 3 million visitors.

== Gallery ==
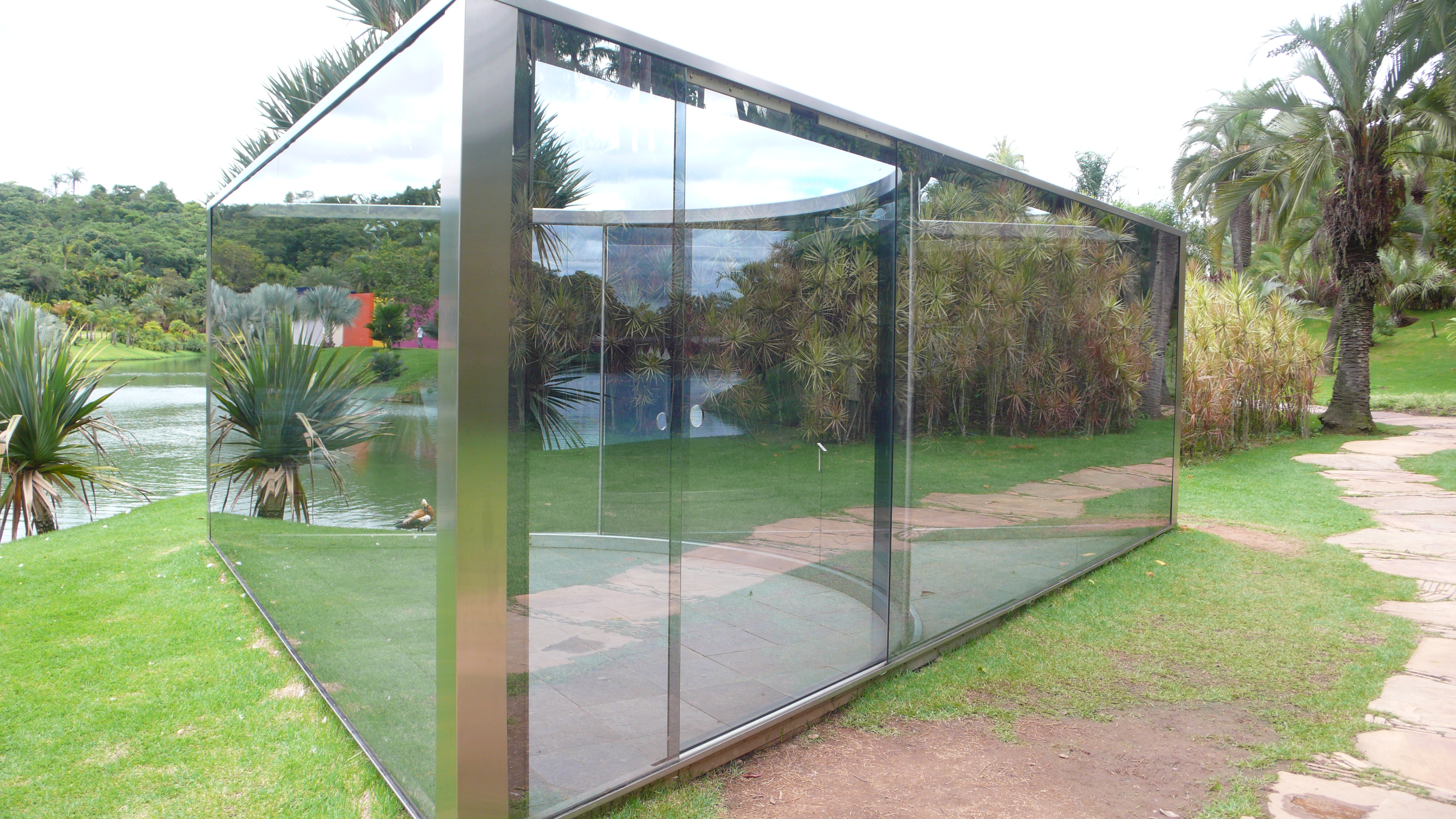
Dan Graham

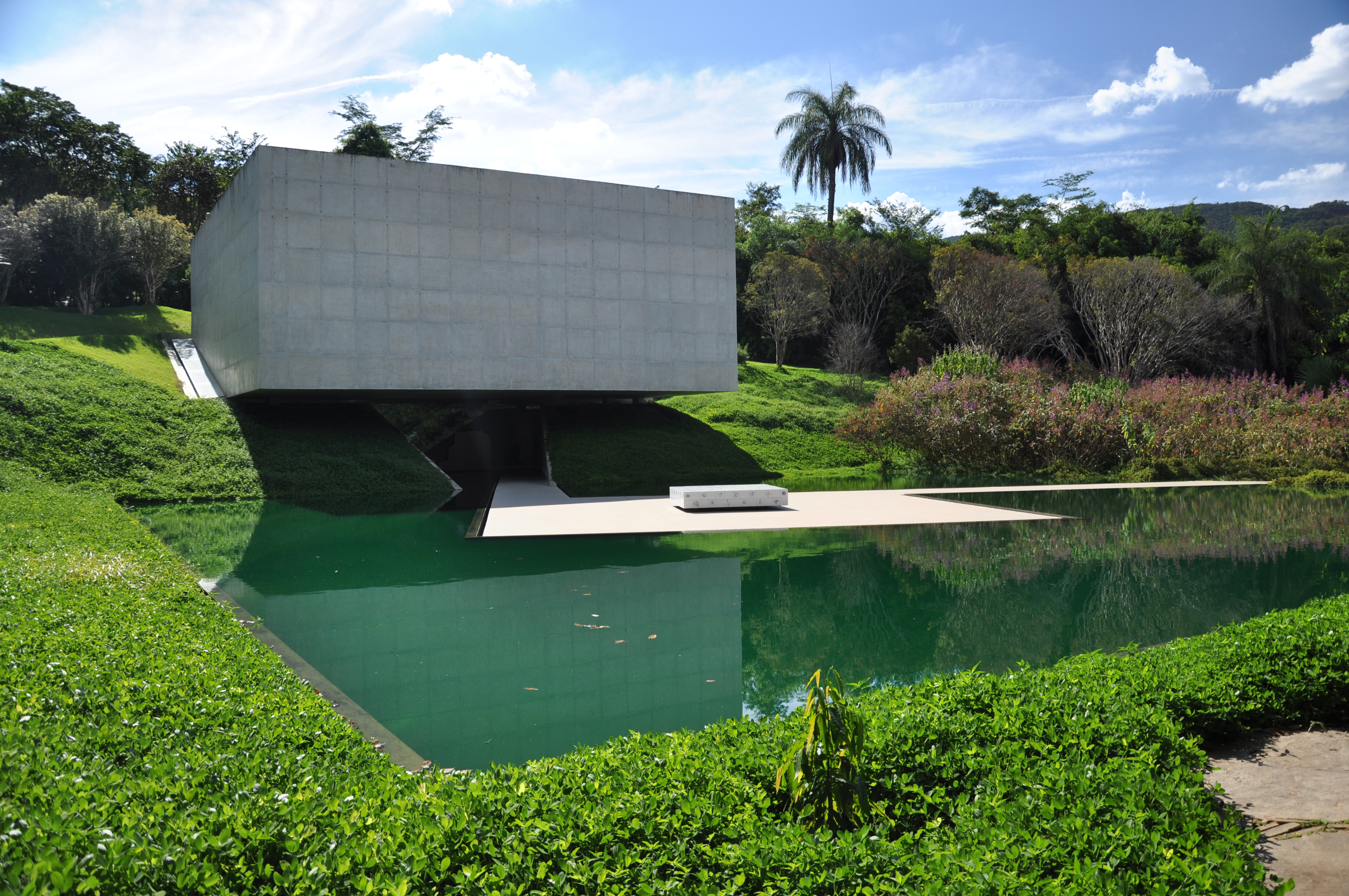
Adriana Varejão

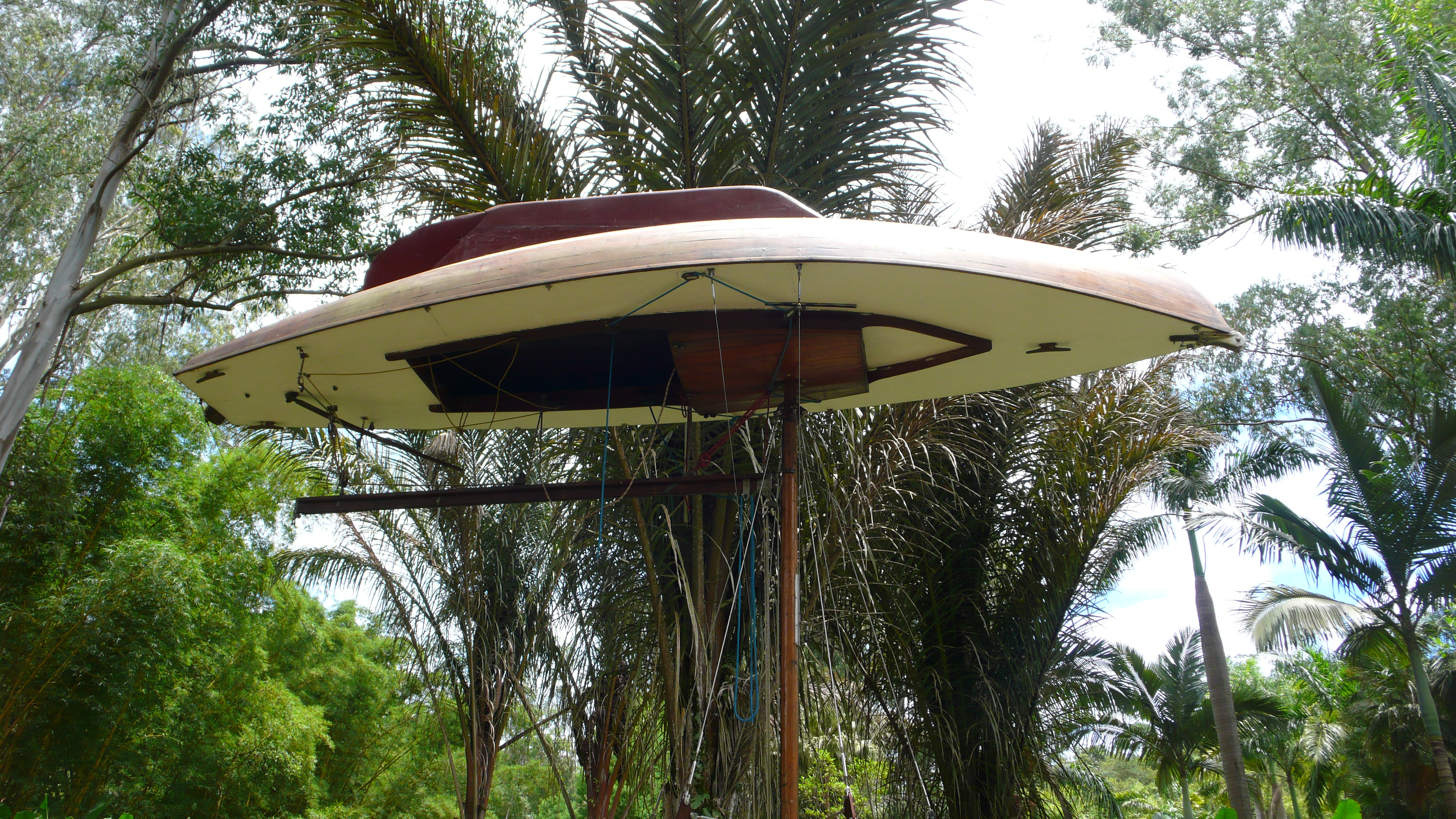
Simon Starling

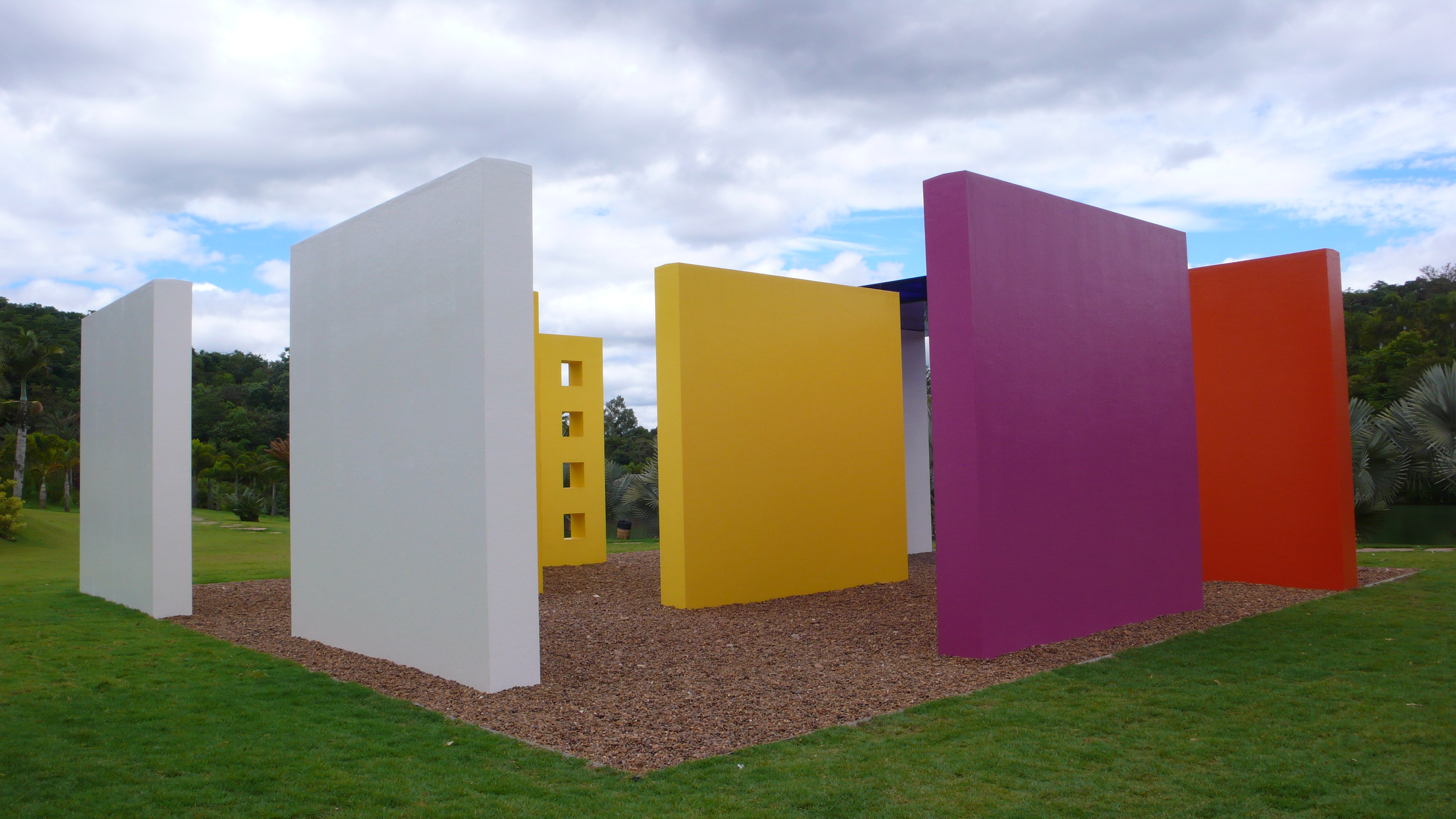
Hélio Oiticica

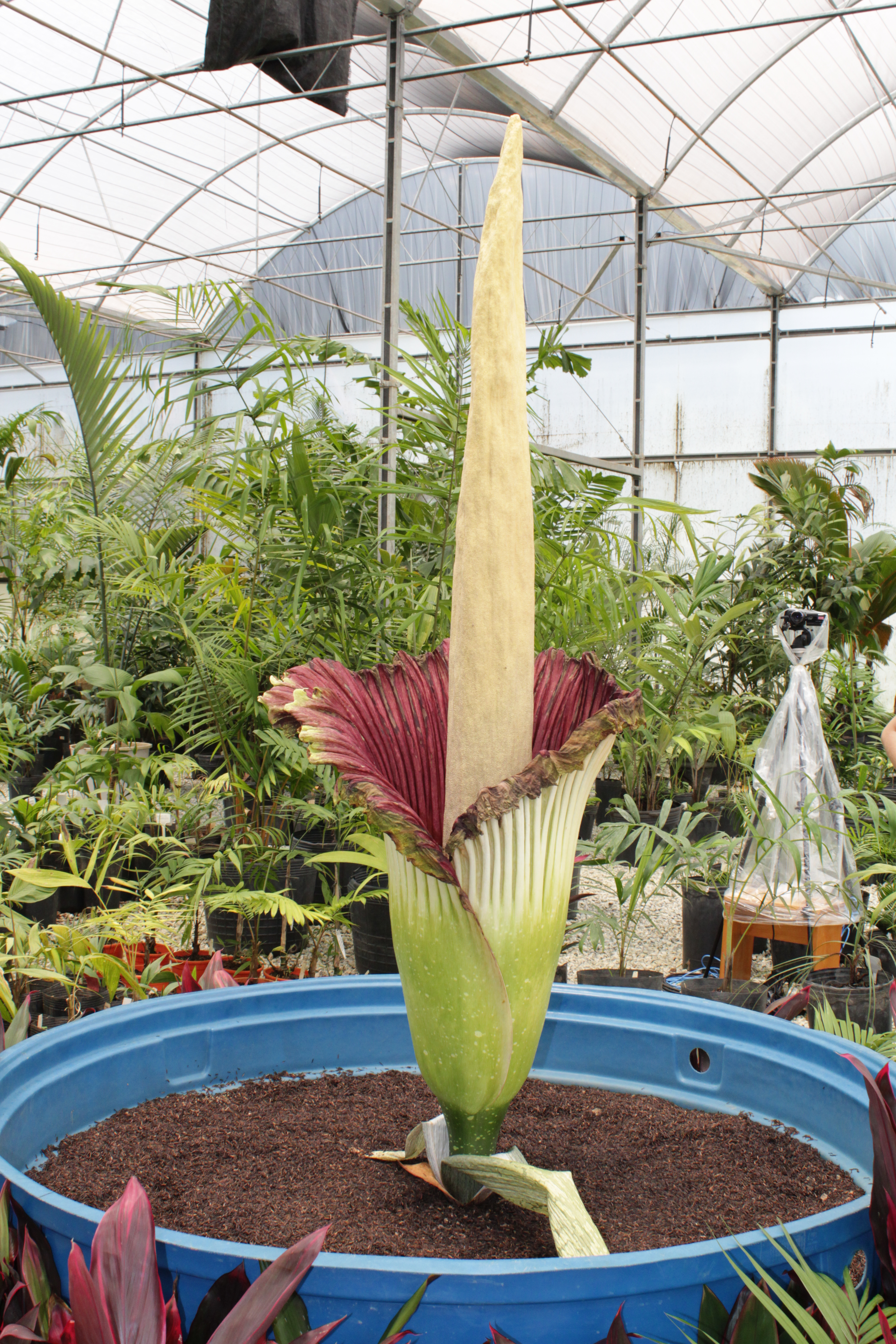
Carrion Flower in Inhotim

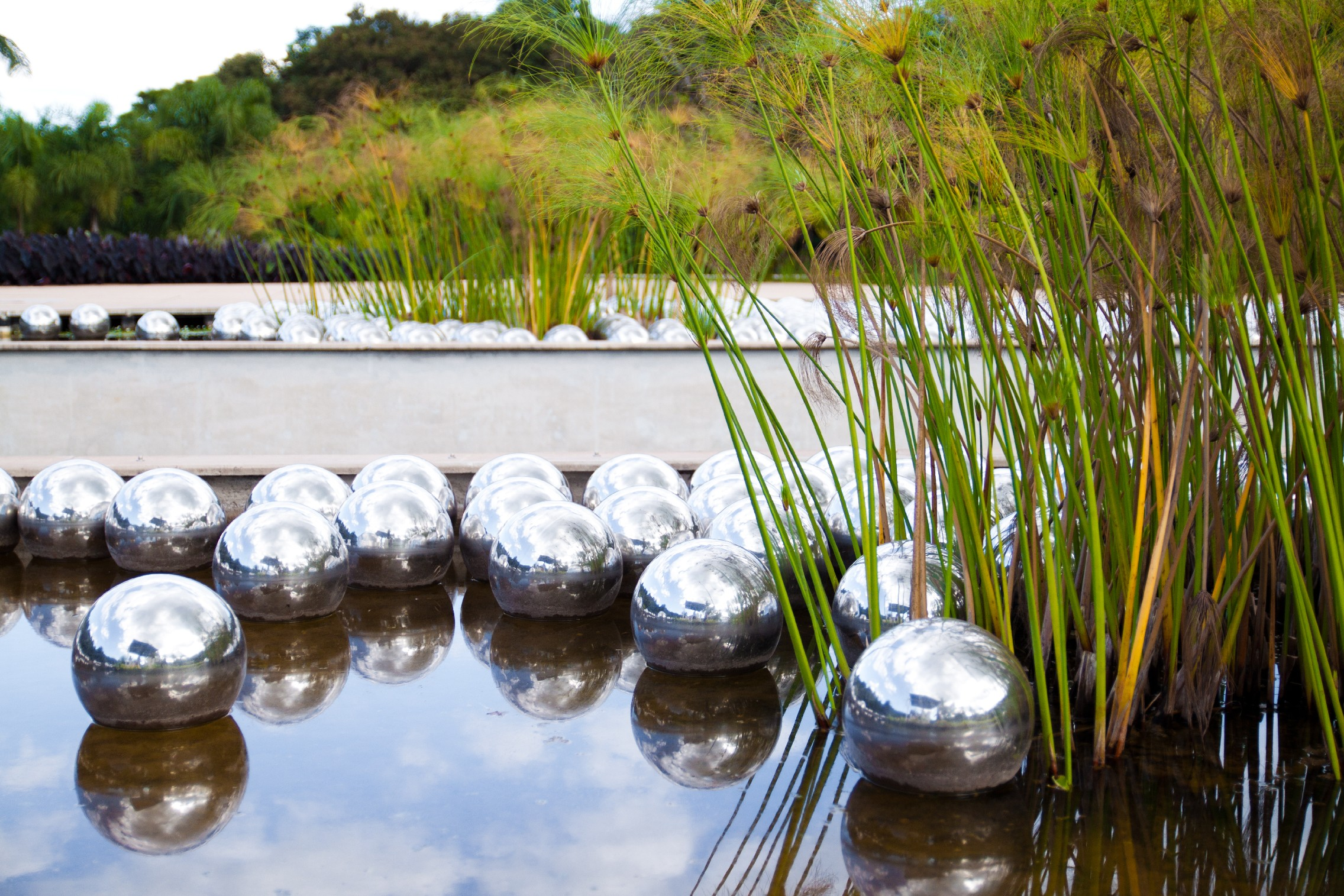
Yayoi Kusama

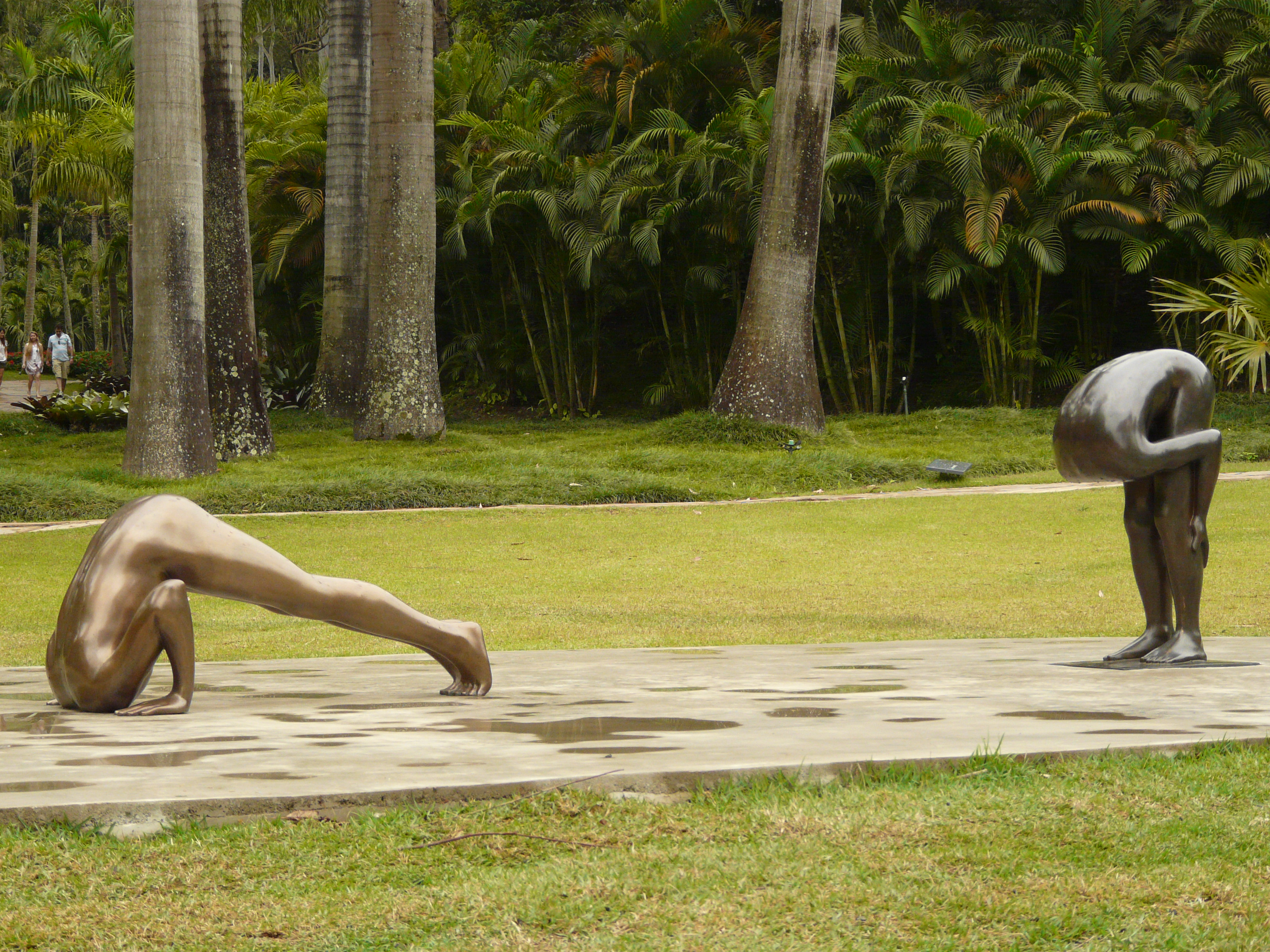
Edgard de Souza

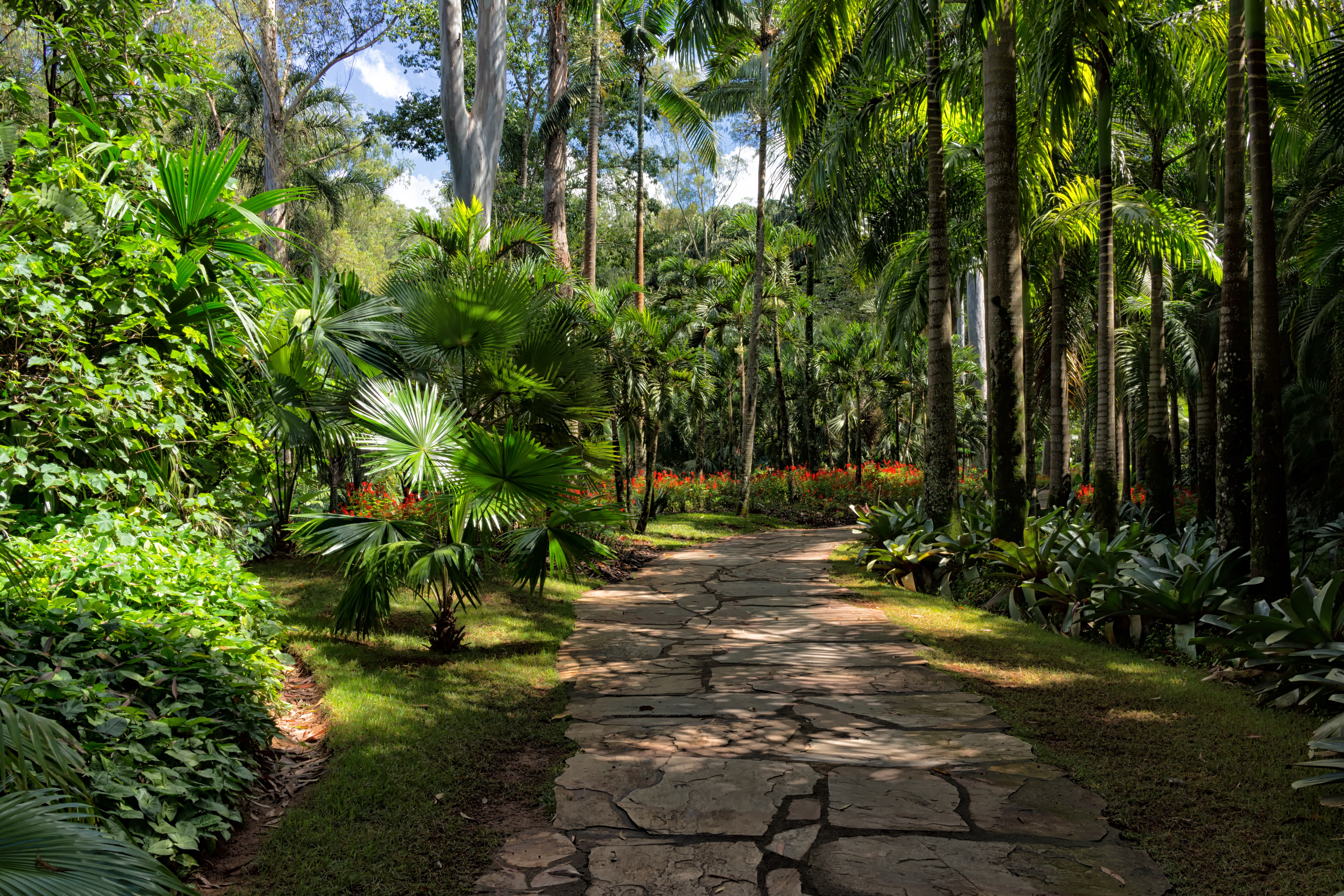
Botanical Garden

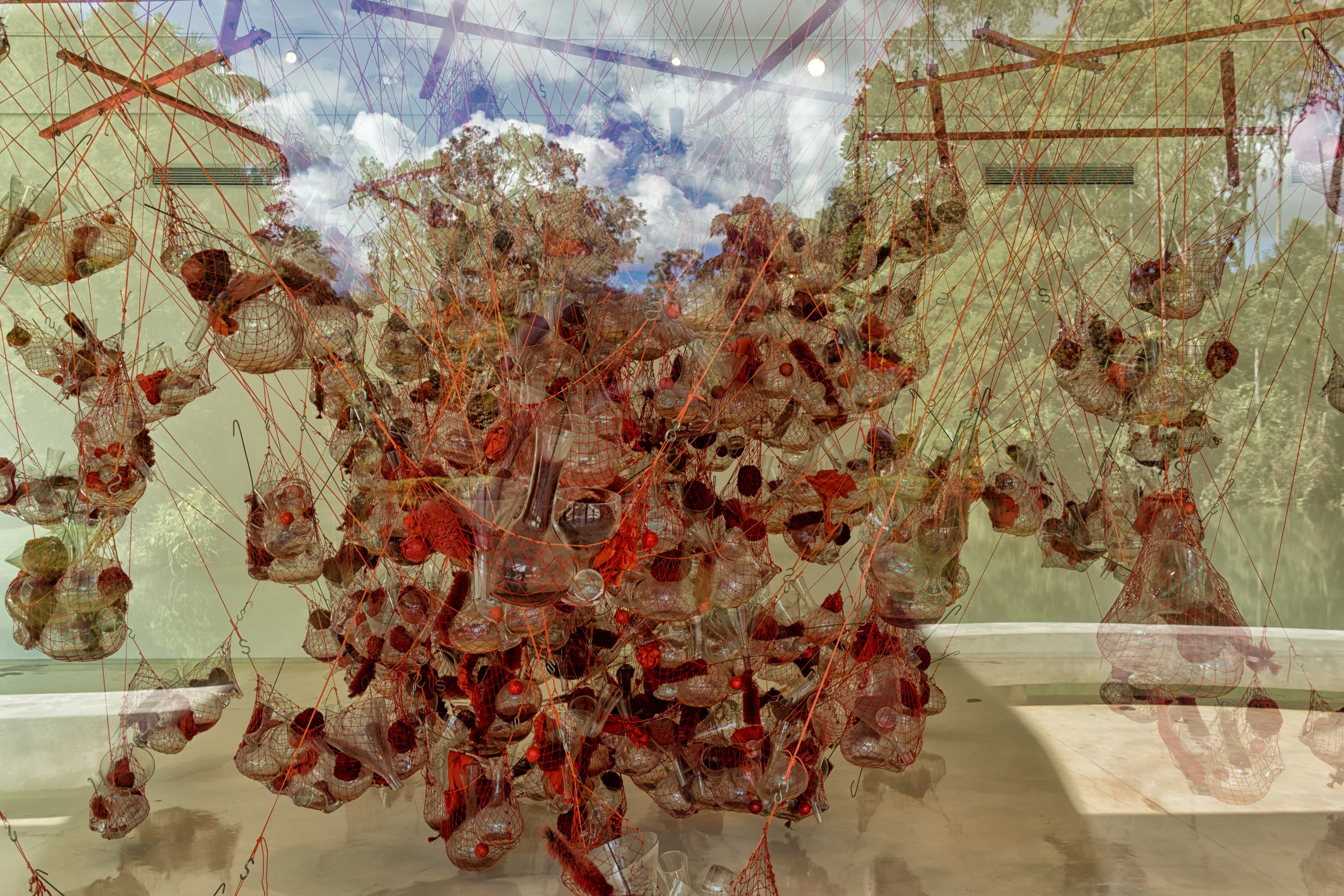
Art installation in Inhotim

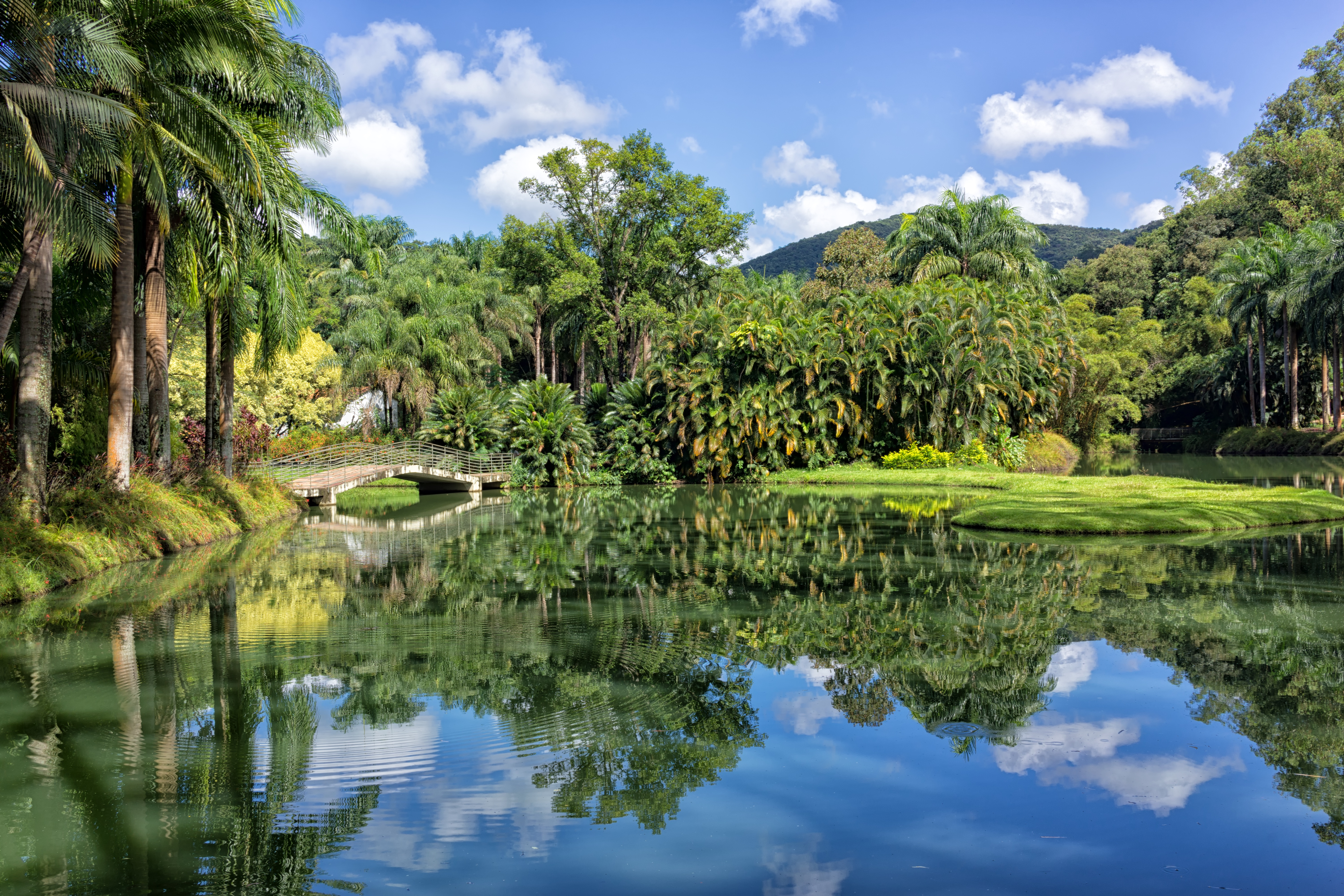
Landscape

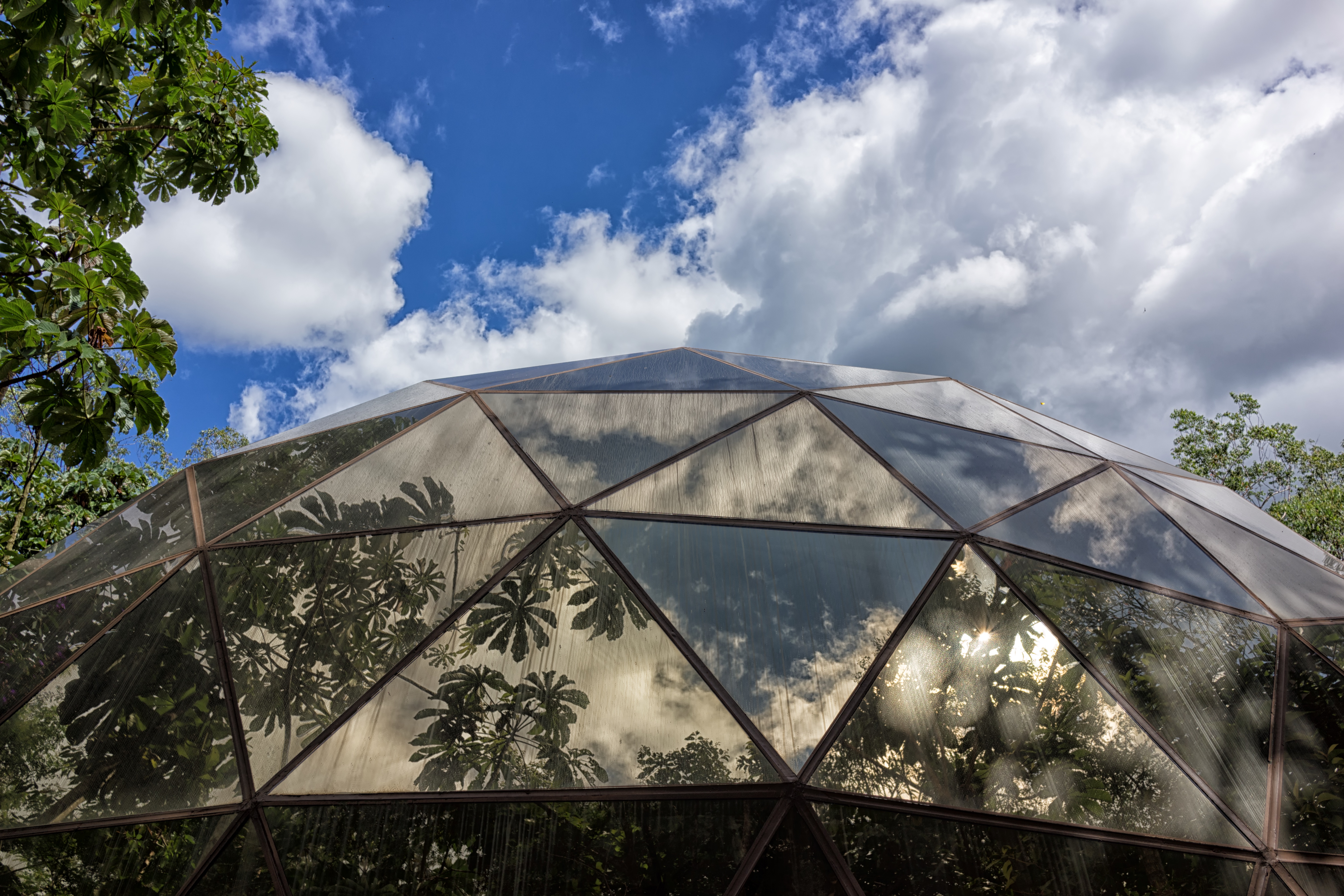
Matthew Barney

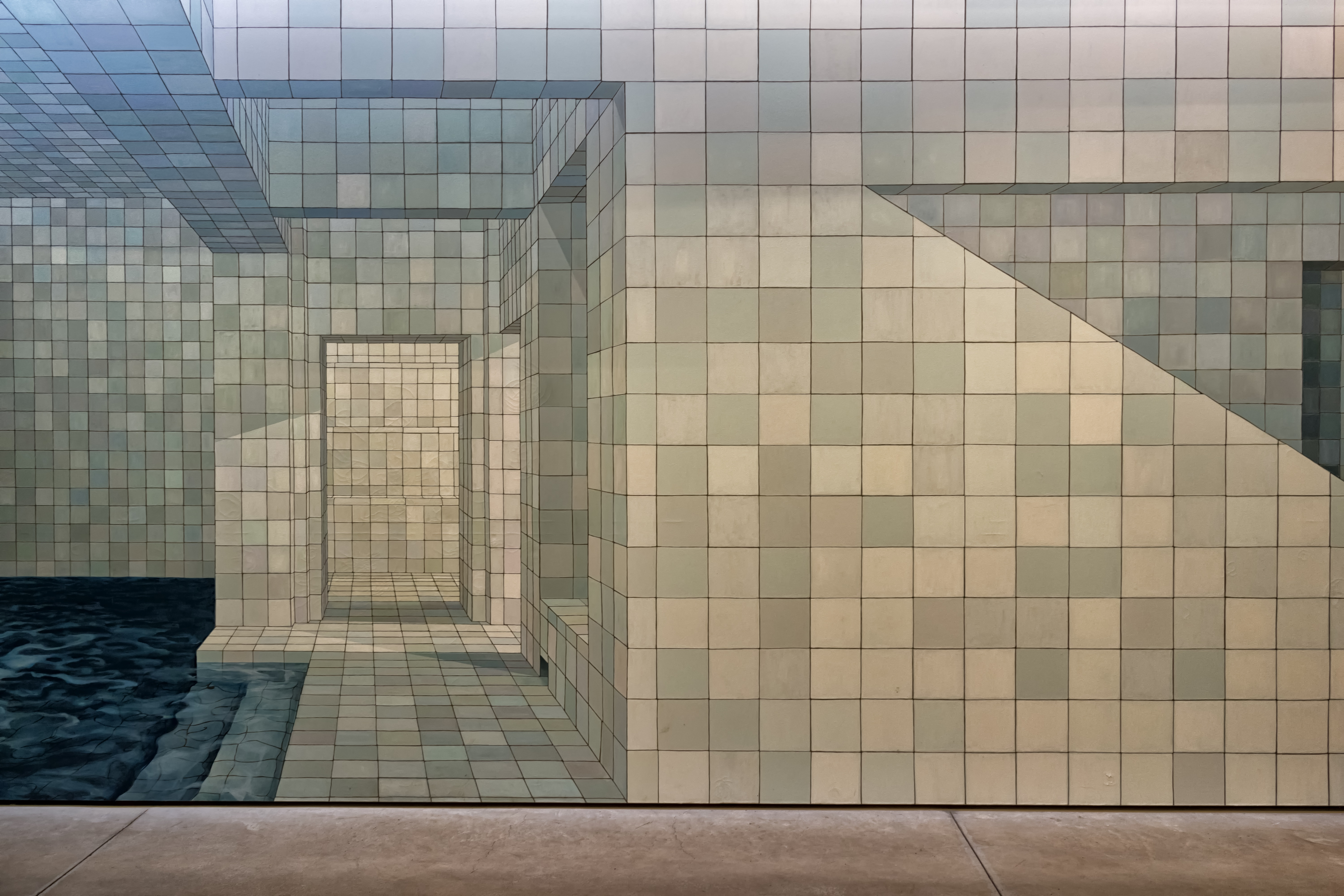
Adriana Varejão

== See also ==
- List of sculpture parks
