= São Paulo Art Biennial =

Art biennial

Coordinates: 23.5880°S 46.6538°W

- Genre: Biennale, focus on contemporary art
- Frequency: Biennial, every two years
- Locations: São Paulo, Brazil
- Inaugurated: 1951
- Website: http://www.bienal.org.br

The São Paulo Art Biennial (Portuguese: Bienal de São Paulo) was founded in 1951 and has been held every two years since. It is the third oldest art biennial in the world after the Venice Biennale (in existence since 1895) and the Menton Biennale (started earlier in 1951), which serves as its role model.

== History ==
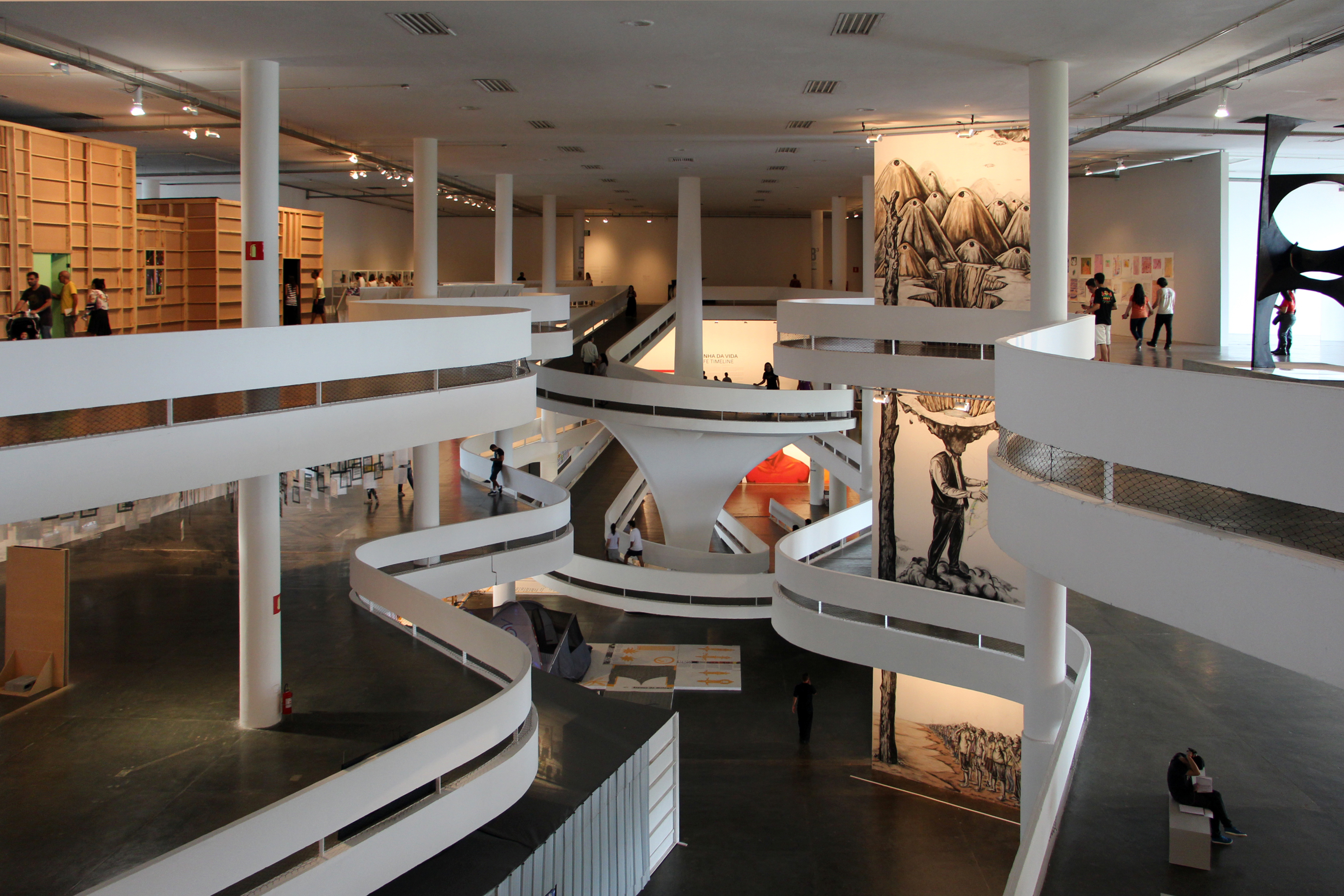
São Paulo Biennial: Pavilhão Ciccillo Matarazzo (2013)

The Biennial was founded by the Italian-Brazilian industrialist Ciccillo Matarazzo (1898–1977). Since 1957, the São Paulo Biennial has been held in the Ciccillo Matarazzo pavilion in the Parque do Ibirapuera. The three-story pavilion was designed by a team led by architects Oscar Niemeyer and Hélio Uchôa, and provides an exhibition space of 30,000 m^{2}. The São Paulo Bienal features Brazilian and international contemporary art and is one of South America's most important large-scale art exhibitions.

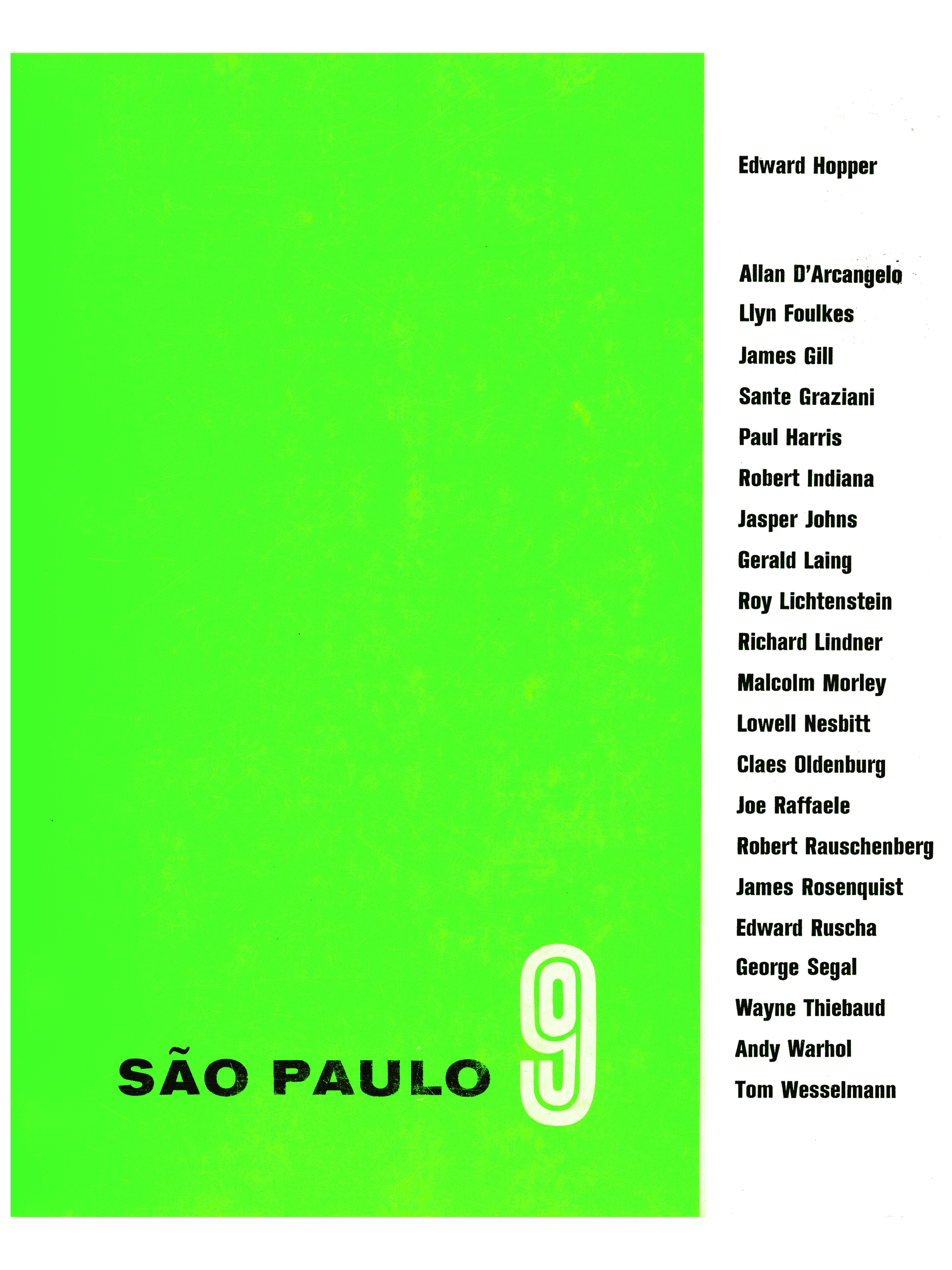
São Paulo 9 (1967)

After the completion of the 6th Biennial, the São Paulo Biennial Foundation was created to advance the exhibition, which until then had been organized by the Museu de Arte Moderna de São Paulo (MAM-SP). The pavilion the institution occupies - its home to this day - only began holding the Bienal exhibitions starting with its 4th edition in 1957.

Since 1951, 32 Bienals have been produced with the participation of 170 countries, more than 16 thousand artists and almost 10 million visitors, making direct contact possible between the Brazilian public and visual, theatrical and graphic arts, music, film, architecture, and other forms of artistic expression from around the world. The 1998 edition cost almost $12 million and drew nearly 400,000 visitors during a two-month run. The 25th biennial was originally scheduled for 2000 but was delayed to 2002 after a gigantic exhibition marking the 500th anniversary of Brazil's discovery by the Portuguese was organized by former biennial president Edemar Cid Ferreira and booked into the Ciccillo Matarazzo pavilion. That year, for the first time, the chief curator of the biennial was a foreigner, Alfons Hug from Germany.

The biennial's initial aim was to make contemporary art (primarily from Western Europe and the United States) known in Brazil, push the country's access to the current art scene in other metropolises, and establish São Paulo itself as an international art center. Naturally, the biennial always serves to bring Brazilian art closer to foreign guests.

== Artists, works and countries ==
Title	Date	Directors / Curators	Artists	Works	Countries
1st Bienal	Oct 20 – Dec 23, 1951	President of MAM-SP: Ciccillo Matarazzo Artistic Director: Lourival Gomes Machado	729	1854	25
2nd Bienal	Dec 13, 1953 – Feb 26, 1954	President of MAM-SP: Ciccillo Matarazzo Artistic Director: Sérgio Milliet Technical Director: Wolfgang Pfeiffer	712	3374	33
3rd Bienal	Jul 2 – Oct 12, 1955	President of MAM-SP: Ciccillo Matarazzo Artistic Director: Sérgio Milliet Technical Director: Wolfgang Pfeiffer	463	2074	31
4th Bienal	Sep 22 – Dec 30, 1957	President of MAM-SP: Ciccillo Matarazzo Artistic Director: Sérgio Milliet Technical Director: Wolfgang Pfeiffer	599	3800	43
5th Bienal	Sep 21 – Dec 31, 1959	President of MAM-SP: Ciccillo Matarazzo Artistic Director: Lourival Gomes Machado	689	3804	47
6th Bienal	Oct 1 – Dec 31, 1961	President of MAM-SP: Ciccillo Matarazzo General Director: Mário Pedrosa	681	4990	50
7th Bienal	Sep 28 – Dec 22, 1963	President of Bienal: Ciccillo Matarazzo General Director: Mário Pedrosa Consultants: Geraldo Ferraz, Sérgio Milliet, Walter Zanini (Plastic Arts); Aldo Calvo, Sábato Magaldi (Theater); Jannar Murtinho Ribeiro (Graphic Arts)	625	4131	55
8th Bienal	Sep 4 – Nov 28, 1965	President of Bienal: Ciccillo Matarazzo General Director: Mário Pedrosa Consultants: Geraldo Ferraz, Sérgio Milliet, Walter Zanini (Plastic Arts); Aldo Calvo, Sábato Magaldi (Theater); Jannar Murtinho Ribeiro (Graphic Arts)	653	4054	54
9th Bienal	Sep 22 – Dec 8, 1967	President of Bienal: Ciccillo Matarazzo Consultants for Plastic Arts: Alfredo Mesquita, Geraldo Ferraz, Henrique E. Mindlin, Jayme Maurício, José Geraldo Vieira, Salvador Candia	956	4638	63
10th Bienal	Sep 27 – Dec 14, 1969	President of Bienal: Ciccillo Matarazzo Art Technical Committee: Aracy Amaral, Edyla Mangabeira Unger, Frederico Nasser, Mário Barata, Waldemar Cordeiro, Wolfgang Pfeiffer	446	2572	53
11th Bienal	Sep 4 – Nov 15, 1971	President of Bienal: Ciccillo Matarazzo Art Technical Committee: Antonio Bento, Geraldo Ferraz, Sérgio Ferro	351	2459	57
12th Bienal	Oct 5 – Dec 2, 1973	President of Bienal: Ciccillo Matarazzo Technical Secretariat: Antonio Bento, Bethy Giudice, Ciccillo Matarazzo, Mário Wilches, Vilém Flusser	468	2484	49
13th Bienal	Oct 17 – Dec 14, 1975	President of Bienal: Ciccillo Matarazzo Council for Art and Culture: Aldemir Martins, Isabel Moraes Barros, José Simeão Leal, Norberto Nicola, Olívio Tavares de Araújo, Olney Krüse, Wolfgang Pfeiffer	280	1579	43
14th Bienal	Oct 1 – Nov 30, 1977	President of Bienal: Oscar Landmann Council for Art and Culture: Alberto Beuttenmüller, Clarival do Prado Valladares, Leopoldo Raimo, Lisetta Levi, Marc Berkowitz, Maria Bonomi, Yolanda Mohalyi	302	476	36
15th Bienal	Oct 3 – Dec 16, 1979	President of Bienal: Luiz Fernando Rodrigues Alves Cultural Advisor: Carlos von Schmidt Council for Art and Culture: Casimiro Xavier de Mendonça, Emmanuel von Lauenstein Massarani, Esther Emílio Carlos, Geraldo Edson de Andrade, João Cândido Martins Galvão Barros, Pedro Manuel Gismondi, Radha Abramo, Wolfgang Pfeiffer	158	302	43
16th Bienal	Oct 16 – Dec 20, 1981	President of Bienal: Luiz Diederichsen Villares General Curator: Walter Zanini Curators: Petrônio França, Agnaldo Farias, Samuel Eduardo Leon, Cacilda Teixeira da Costa, Gabriela Suzana, Julio Plaza, Annateresa Fabris, Victor Musgrave, Josette Balsa / Associate Curators: Roberto Sandoval, Cida Galvão, Marília Saboya, Renata Barros	213	1766	32
17th Bienal	Oct 14 – Dec 18, 1983	President of Bienal: Luiz Diederichsen Villares General Curator: Walter Zanini Curators: Julio Plaza, Berta Sichel, Walter Zanini, Rui Moreira Leite, Gino Di Maggio, Norberto Nicola / Cinema Curators: Agnaldo Farias, Samuel Eduardo Leon	187	1650	43
18th Bienal	Oct 4 – Dec 15, 1985	President of Bienal: Roberto Muylaert General Curator: Sheila Leirner	214	1674	45
19th Bienal	Oct 2 – Dec 13, 1987	President of Bienal: Jorge Wilheim General Curator: Sheila Leirner Curators: Ivo Mesquita, Sônia Salzstein-Goldberg, Gabriela S. Wilder, Arturo Schwarz, Rafael França, Joice Joppert Leal, Angela Carvalho, Ana Maria Kieffer	215	1740	53
20th Bienal	Oct 14 – Dec 10, 1989	President of Bienal: Alex Periscinoto Curators: Carlos von Schmidt (International), Stella Teixeira de Barros (National), João Cândido Galvão (Special Events)	143	1824	41
21st Bienal	Sep 21 – Dec 10, 1991	President of Bienal: Jorge Eduardo Stockler General Curator: João Cândido Galvão Curators: Ana Helena Curti, Gloria Cristina Motta	144	1028	32
22nd Bienal	Oct 12 – Dec 11, 1994	President of Bienal: Edemar Cid Ferreira Curator: Nelson Aguilar	206	972	70
23rd Bienal	Oct 5 – Dec 8, 1996	President of Bienal: Edemar Cid Ferreira General Curator: Nelson Aguilar Associate Curator: Agnaldo Farias	134	1181	75
24th Bienal	Oct 3 – Dec 3, 1998	President of Bienal: Julio Landman General Curator: Paulo Herkenhoff Associate Curator: Adriano Pedrosa	326	1140	54
25th Bienal	Mar 23 – Jun 2, 2002	President of Bienal: Carlos Bratke General Curator: Alfons Hug Brazilian Nucleus Curator: Agnaldo Farias	194	546	68
26th Bienal	Sep 25 – Dec 19, 2004	President of Bienal: Manoel Francisco Pires da Costa General Curator: Alfons Hug	141	400	61
27th Bienal	Oct 7 – Dec 17, 2006	President of Bienal: Manoel Francisco Pires da Costa General Curator: Lisette Lagnado Co-curators: Adriano Pedrosa, Cristina Freire, José Roca, Rosa Martínez Guest Curator: Jochen Volz	118	645	51
28th Bienal	Oct 26 – Dec 6, 2008	President of Bienal: Manoel Francisco Pires da Costa General Curator: Ivo Mesquita Associate Curator: Ana Paula Cohen	41	54	20
29th Bienal	Sep 25 – Dec 12, 2010	President of Bienal: Heitor Martins Chief-curators: Agnaldo Farias, Moacir dos Anjos Guest Curators: Chus Martinez, Fernando Alvim, Rina Carvajal, Sarat Maharaj, Yuko Hasegawa	159	850	40
30th Bienal	Sep 7 – Dec 7, 2012	President of Bienal: Heitor Martins Curator: Luis Pérez-Oramas Associate Curators: André Severo, Tobi Maier Assistant Curator: Isabela Villanueva	111	3796	31
31st Bienal	Sep 6 – Dec 7, 2014	President of Bienal: Luis Terepins Curators: Charles Esche, Pablo Lafuente, Nuria Enguita Mayo, Galit Eilat, Oren Sagiv Associate Curators: Benjamin Seroussi, Luiza Proença	69	81	34
32nd Bienal	Sep 7 – Dec 11, 2016	President of Bienal: Luis Terepins Curator: Jochen Volz Co-curators: Gabi Ngcobo, Júlia Rebouças, Lars Bang Larsen, Sofía Olascoaga	81	415	33
33rd Bienal	Sep 7 – Dec 9, 2018	President of Bienal: João Carlos de Figueiredo Ferraz Curator: Gabriel Perez-Barreiro Artist-curators: Alejandro Cesarco, Antonio Ballester Moreno, Claudia Fontes, Mamma Andersson, Sofia Borges, Waltercio Caldas, Wura-Natasha Ogunji	103	600	
34th Bienal	Sep 4 – Dec 5, 2021	President of Bienal: José Olympio da Veiga Pereira Curator: Jacopo Crivelli Visconti Co-curators: Paulo Miyada, Carla Zaccagnini, Francesco Stocchi, Ruth Estévez	91	1100	39
35th Bienal	Sep 6 – Dec 10, 2023	President of Bienal: José Olympio da Veiga Pereira Curators: Diane Lima, Grada Kilomba, Hélio Menezes, Manuel Borja-Villel	121	1100	
36th Bienal	Sep 6, 2025 – Jan 11, 2026	President of Bienal: Andrea Pinheiro Curator: Bonaventure Soh Bejeng Ndikung Co-curators: Keyna Eleison, Alya Sebti, Anna Roberta Goetz, Thiago de Paula Souza	125	1000+	
37th Bienal	scheduled for Sep 2027	Chief Curators: Amanda Carneiro and Raphael Fonseca Curators: Ana Salazar Herrera, Léuli Eshrāghi, Rado Ištok, Ryan Inouye and Yina Jiménez Suriel Curatorial Assistants: Amanda Tavares and Mayara Carvalho			

== Highlights year by year ==
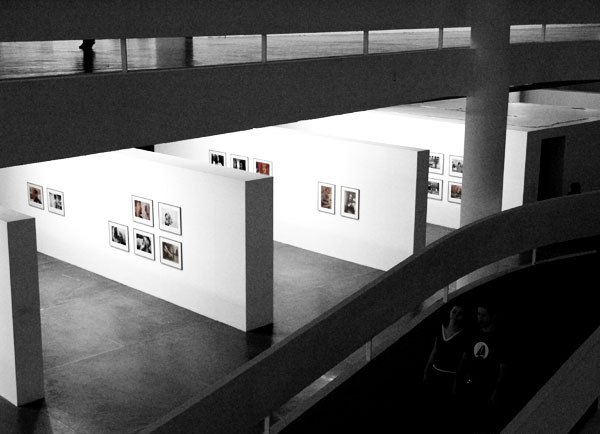
27. São Paulo Art Biennial - 2006

=== 1st Bienal, 1951 ===
The first Bienal was held by the Museum of Modern Art of São Paulo (MAM-SP) in a temporary pavilion located on the Belvedere Trianon, in the neighborhood along Paulista Avenue. Abraham Palatnik’s first Aparelho cinecromático (1949) was initially rejected by the selection committee on the grounds that it did not fit any of the established categories, though the work was later accepted and awarded an honorable mention by the international jury.

=== 2nd Bienal, 1953 ===
Known as the “Guernica Bienal”, in reference to Pablo Picasso’s 1937 masterpiece, the 2nd Bienal is by far one of the most memorable editions of the event. Exhibiting twice as many artworks as the first edition, the 2nd Bienal was held at two pavilions designed for the newly inaugurated Ibirapuera Park by Oscar Niemeyer (1917-2012): the States Pavilion (presently the Pavilion of Brazilian Cultures) and the Nations Pavilion (now home to the Afro Brasil Museum). The exhibition continued into the following year as part of the celebrations for São Paulo's 400th anniversary.

=== 3rd Bienal, 1955 ===
Having established itself as an important event in international art world, the Bienal's 3rd edition featured the Mexican muralists Diego Rivera, José Clemente Orozco and David Alfaro Siqueiros.

=== 4th Bienal, 1957 ===
In the 4th Bienal, many Brazilian artists contested the selection process and Ciccillo Matarazzo's inordinate influence. This was the first time the Bienal was held at its present home, the Industry Pavilion at Ibirapuera Park. This edition was surrounded by controversy when works by several leading names in the Brazilian art scene, such as Flávio de Carvalho, were turned down by the selection jury. The abstract expressionist Jackson Pollock, who died the year before, was honoured with a special room organized by the American delegation, which marked the height of his international renown.

=== 5th Bienal, 1959 ===
200,000 visitors ensured the success of this exhibition, whose highlights included a selection of thirty works by the impressionist icon, Vincent van Gogh, and a strong showing of Tachism and Informal Art.

=== 6th Bienal, 1961 ===
Ciccillo Matarazzo ceases to be the main patron of the Bienal and the exhibition endured its first financial crisis. The 6th edition is remembered for its museology and the predominance of Neoconcretism, typified by the revolutionary presence of Lygia Clark’s Bichos. Furthermore, part of the selection committee was elected by artists. The Bienal received a delegation from the USSR for the first time in the event’s history.

=== 7th Bienal, 1963 ===
The 7th edition was marked by an excessive number of works selected, which, in turn, created an eclectic scene that was difficult to understand. This was the first time that Fundação Bienal (founded in 1962) organized the exhibition, instead of the Museum of Modern Art of São Paulo. The catalog was dedicated to Wanda Svevo, who died the previous year.

=== 8th Bienal, 1965 ===
The Bienal comes under political pressure from the government with the beginning of the military dictatorship in Brazil. At the awards ceremony, artists Maria Bonomi and Sérgio Camargo deliver a motion for the repeal of the preventive arrests of Mário Schenberg, Fernando Henrique Cardoso, Florestan Fernandes and Cruz Costa to the President Castelo Branco. Despite the complications, the exhibition is remembered for a special room dedicated to Surrealism and Fantastic art. Marcel Duchamp’s famous ready-made Roue de bicyclette (1913) was shown alongside works by Max Ernst, Marc Chagall, Joan Miró, Jean Arp, Man Ray, Paul Klee, Paul Delvaux, René Magritte and Francis Picabia.

=== 9th Bienal, 1967 ===
The “Pop Art Bienal” opened under a shroud of controversy: even before the exhibition opened, the Federal Police removed two works on the grounds that they were “offensive” to the Brazilian Constitution: Cybèle Varela’s painting O presente was considered “anti-nationalist” – the work was destroyed and the artist almost arrested by the DOPS – and the series by Quissak Jr., Meditação sobre a Bandeira Nacional, which infringed laws that prohibited the free use of the flag. The US delegation presented a sample of Pop Art that included Jasper Johns, Andy Warhol, Roy Lichtenstein and Robert Rauschenberg. Many works were damaged and the US room was vandalized a few days into the exhibition. From this show on, the award jury was composed of art critics rather than consultants.

=== 10th Bienal, 1969 ===
Months after Institutional Act n. 5 (AI-5) came into force, effectively annulling personal freedoms, eighty percent of the artists invited to exhibition refused, in protest, to participate. The 10th edition was thus nicknamed the “Boycott Bienal”

=== 11th Bienal, 1971 ===
Controversy surrounded the opening of the Bienal with the boycott by artists, again, and the exile of Mario Pedrosa, who had been a leader for most of the editions in the Bienal's first decade, and director of the 6th and 7th editions. The selection of Brazilian artists was made from a pre-Bienal held the previous year.

=== 12th Bienal, 1973 ===
A giant mouth designed by Vera Figueiredo "swallowed" visitors to 12th Bienal, demonstrating the strength of Neo-concrete derivations. Installations and environments that appealed to all of the senses were presented in the Art and Communication segment. Replacing the Art Technical Committee, the Council for Art and Culture (CAC) developed a new selection framework and denied entry to 90% of the Brazilian works submitted. The Brazilian Representation was made up of 100 artists selected through regional juries (Fortaleza, Salvador, Belo Horizonte, Rio de Janeiro, São Paulo, Curitiba). Kandinsky's works, which were brought by the French Representation, are exhibited for the first time in South America.

=== 13th Bienal, 1975 ===
Eager for updating, the so-called "Videomakers Bienal" brought Brazil a precise selection video art produced by renowned artists from all parts of the world, ranging from Andy Warhol to South Korean Nam June Paik, whose installation TV Garden (1974) surprised the Brazilian audience by arranging TV monitors among vases of Palm trees and artificial plants.

=== 14th Bienal, 1977 ===
The first Bienal without Ciccillo was defined by meaningful changes: the appointment of a Council for Art and Culture with freedom to develop the exhibition program – among the new rules is the requirement that National Representations follow the themes proposed by the Bienal for the selection of artists, a model inspired by the Venice Biennale. The CAC defines three chapters for the exhibition: Anthological Exhibitions (replacing the Special Rooms), Great Confrontations and Contemporary Propositions – the latter composed of seven themes: Urban Archaeology, Nature Recuperation, Catastrophic Art, Video Art, Space Poetry, The Wall as a Display for Artworks, Non Codified Art. For the first time in its history, the Grand Prize "Itamaraty" was awarded to a Latin American artist, the Argentine Grupo CAYC of the Centro de Arte y Comunicación in Buenos Aires.

=== 15th Bienal, 1979 ===
The "Bienal of the Bienals" was a retrospective of the previous fourteen editions and brought national and international prize-winning works since 1951 back to the pavilion, as well as artists selected by the Brazilian Association of Art Critics (ABCA). On the other hand, it was the first Bienal not to grant any awards, a strategy that would continue on definitively in the following editions.

=== 16th Bienal, 1981 ===
The emergence of the General Curator role would change the course of the Bienal. The critic and former Director of the Museum of Contemporary Art of the University of São Paulo (MAC-USP), Walter Zanini, was the first to fill the position, in an edition which abolished separate spaces for each country and chose to group the works according to "analogy of language" (techniques and themes). This show also marks the end of the boycotts of the Bienal by artists and the beginning of political openness in Brazil.

=== 17th Bienal, 1983 ===
The increasingly common languages in contemporary global art of performance, video, videotext, installation and happening set the tone of the 17th Bienal. Fluxus Street was installed on the ground floor of the pavilion and was one of the most memorable installations. It even included a room with documentation on the group – records of Ben Vautier sleeping, Dick Higgins playing the piano, and Wolf Vostell during an action in New York.

=== 18th Bienal, 1985 ===
This edition showed the rising trend of expressionism in contemporary painting and featured an unusual expography that set the debate through the course of the entire 18th Bienal. The curator, Sheila Leirner, arranged most of the works in three 100-meter long halls, installing paintings side by side – a display called the Great Canvas.

=== 19th Bienal, 1987 ===
Adopting “Utopia versus Reality” as its theme, the 19th Bienal's highlights were the works by German artist Anselm Kiefer. Marked by a strong presence of installations and sculptures, the third floor of the pavilion received the monumental sculpture, Palette mit Flügel (1985), by Kiefer, and the installation Enquanto flora a borda... (1987), by Tunga, which would slide from the ceiling to the floor in the large central span of the pavilion.

=== 20th Bienal, 1989 ===
The 20th Bienal was conceived by a triumvirate: Carlos von Schmidt, Stella Teixeira de Barros, and João Cândido Galvão. Interrupting the propositions of past editions, the team resumed the granting of awards and the arrangement of national representations in separate rooms. The Brazilian Representation was considered to be one of the most solid in a long time.

=== 21st Bienal, 1991 ===
Only for this edition did the Bienal resume the system of open registration for artists from all over the world. Heading the curatorship, João Cândido Galvão repeated his role in the previous edition as curator of the dance, music and theater sections, and enjoyed success by presenting two unforgettable performances: Suz/O/Suz, by the Catalan group Fura dels Baus, and O Trilogie Antica: Medeea, Troienele, Electra, by Henrik Ibsen, narrated in Latin and Greek by the National Theater Company of Bucharest.

=== 22nd Bienal, 1994 ===
The Bienal changes its calendar and starts taking place in even-numbered years. The historical segment takes on a major importance in this edition, whose theme, “Rupture as Support,” made it possible to explore platforms and poetics observed in the works of Hélio Oiticica, Lygia Clark and Mira Schendel.

=== 23rd Bienal, 1996 ===
A new record in the number of national representations with 75 countries subscribing to the theme proposed by Nelson Aguilar: “The Dematerialization of Art at the End of the Millennium.” On this occasion, a Historical Nucleus with a broad diversity of countries brought together over 200 prints by Francisco de Goya, illustrated the posthumous work of Jean-Michael Basquiat, and presented 37 paintings by Edvard Munch.

=== 24th Bienal, 1998 ===
Known as one of the best editions ever produced, the "Anthropophagy Bienal" was led by Paulo Herkenhoff as general curator and Adriano Pedrosa as associate curator. The concept, extracted from the roots of Brazilian culture, permeated the work of all 76 artists involved in the exhibition, as well as was the result of powerful solo shows dedicated to each of the 53 National Representations. The curators worked with the idea of contamination and put contemporary Brazilian works in dialogue with works in the Historical Nucleus.

The 1998 bienial was specifically acclaimed a new perspective on art history through a Brazilian lens. It introduced a novel curatorial approach relevant to the era of post-colonial globalization. The exhibition utilized the Brazilian concept of anthropophagy as both a theoretical framework and practical methodology. This approach encouraged the "contamination" and "cannibalization" of established art historical narratives, alongside a broader understanding of the exhibition's educational role in integrating art, culture, and political history.

=== 25th Bienal, 2002 ===
Centered on the theme “Metropolitan Iconographies”, the 25th Bienal has become famous for the strong presence of Brazilian artists off the São Paulo/Rio de Janeiro axis. The appointment of the first foreign curator, Alfons Hug, from Germany, excited controversy. However, the show received excellent acclaim and beat attendance records, at 668,428 visitors.

==== Taiwan controversy ====
During the event, the title of Taiwan's national pavilion was changed overnight to read "Museum of Fine Arts, Taipei". This was revealed to have been caused by the Chinese government, who had threatened to pull their own artists out of the event. In protest Chien-Chi Chang, the artist chosen to represent Taiwan at the Biennial, closed their installation. Austrian group Monochrom, who were running the neighbouring pavilion, invited other artists to donate letters from their own country titles in order to recreate the word "Taiwan". Although they were successful, this too was taken down.

=== 26th Bienal, 2004 ===
This was the first year of the free admission policy, which would be applied to all subsequent editions. With the theme of “Free Territory,” the 26th Bienal, introduced a new generation into the art scene, such as Cabelo, Chelpa Ferro and Laura Vinci, among others. Once again the exhibition demonstrated its highly contemporary character by presenting works mostly produced between 2002 and 2004. At least one third of the works in the show were site-specific projects, developed specifically for the Bienal Pavilion.

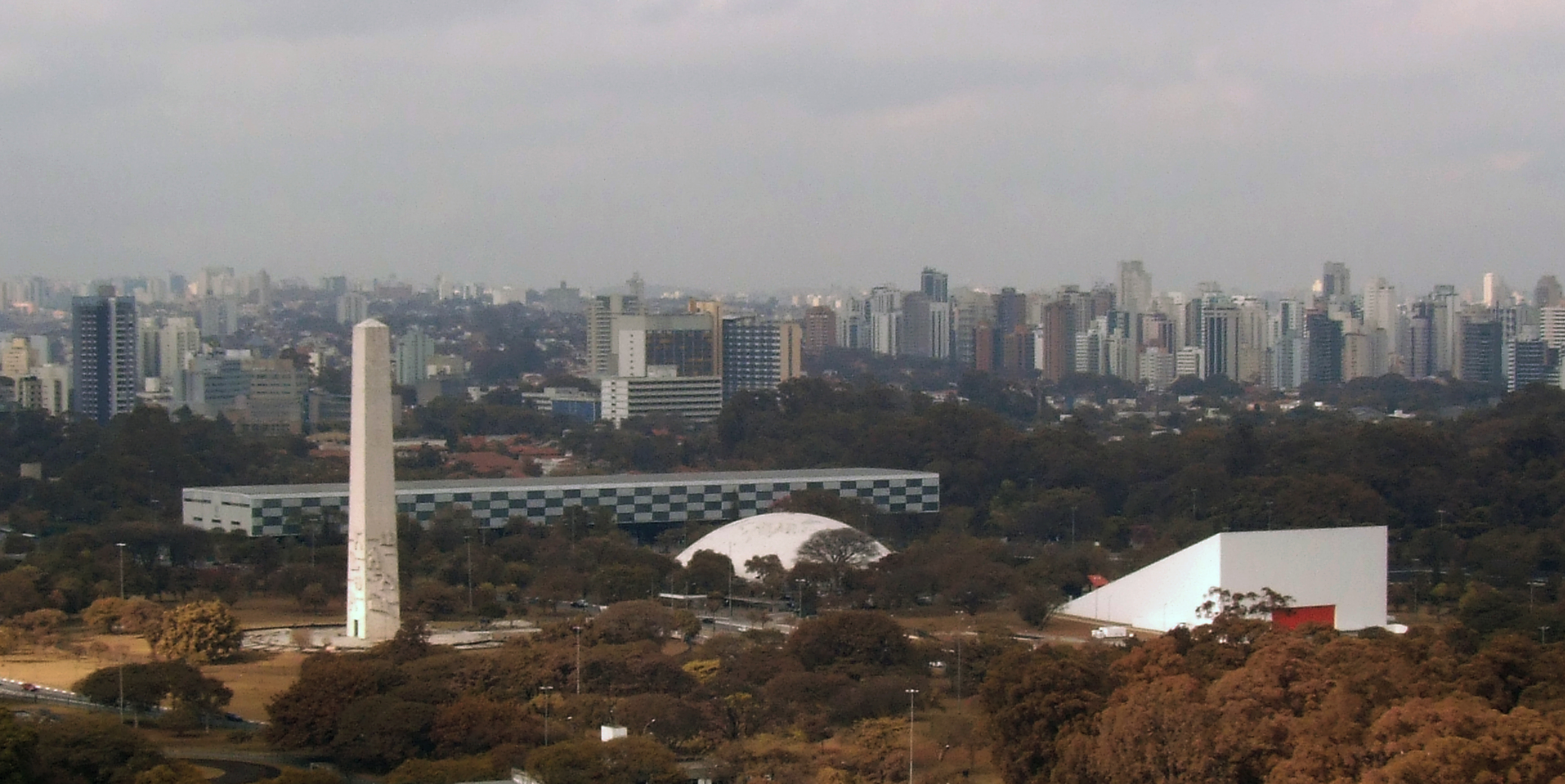
São Paulo Art Biennial, Pavilhão Ciccillo Matarazzo, Ibirapuera Park

=== 27th Bienal, 2006 ===
The theme “How to Live Together” – the title of a set of seminars delivered by Roland Barthes in the 1970s – served curator Lisette Lagnado as a guide. The edition was marked by the extinction of National Representations – the selection of artists was up to the determination of the curators of the Bienals – and by the claim that art is a transnational language. Constituting a fundamental innovation for the exhibition, the curatorial projects would be chosen from then on through a selection process conducted by an international committee of critics and curators.

=== 28th Bienal, 2008 ===
Rethinking the purpose and direction of the exhibition, the 28th Bienal – “In Living Contact” carried out a radical proposal by keeping the second floor of the pavilion completely empty, as an Open Plan – a metaphor for the conceptual crisis experienced by traditional biennial systems faced by the institutions that organize them. The noteworthy episode of that edition was the graffiti on the pavilion's guardrails, which led to a discussion in the art milieu about urban art.

=== 29th Bienal, 2010 ===
Driven by a new impetus promoted by a new board of directors committed to the renewal of the institution, the Bienal inaugurated its 29th edition with a permanent educational project and a broad parallel program. Favoring politically oriented works, the curatorship of Agnaldo Farias and Moacir dos Anjos held nearly 400 activities in the six conceptual spaces entitled Terreiros, and made its theme a verse by Jorge de Lima: “There is always a cup of sea to sail in”. Bandeira branca (2010), by Nuno Ramos, stirred controversy due to its live vultures flying in the central span of the pavilion accompanied by a montage of sounds from the national popular tradition.

=== 30th Bienal, 2012 ===
Titled “The Imminence of Poetics”, this edition of the Bienal adopted the constellation as a metaphor and established discursive interconnections between past and present; center and periphery; object and language. With a large number of works by each artist, the exhibition focused on Latin American artists and paid tribute to Arthur Bispo do Rosário and Waldemar Cordeiro. The project Mobile Radio set up a radio station on the mezzanine floor of the pavilion that had broadcasts throughout the entire period of the exhibition. The Biennial featured the largest corpus of works by Alair Gomes ever shown, the entire portfolio People of the XXth Century by August Sander and for the first time in the Americas the entire Alphabet Bété by Frédéric Bruly-Bouabré, among 119 artists represented within the Matarazzo Pavilion and other institutions throughout the city of São Paulo.

=== 31st Bienal, 2014 ===
The works of this edition – entitled “How to (…) things that don’t exist” – were designed within the concept of "project," many carried out in collaboration between two or more individuals – artists and professionals from other disciplines, such as teachers, sociologists, architects or writers. Daring, the exhibition established itself as being deeply connected with some central themes of contemporary life: identity, sexuality and transcendence.

=== 32nd Bienal, 2016 ===
The 32nd Bienal – “Live Uncertainty” set itself the aim of observing notions of uncertainty and strategies offered by contemporary art to embrace or inhabit it. Established artists like Öyvind Fahlström, Sonia Andrade, Lourdes Castro and Víctor Grippo were seen alongside young artists, most of whom were women. Also noteworthy is the fact that this edition was the one that presented the highest number of commissioned artworks in the history of the exhibition. The curators traveled to four cities to bring forth Study Days (Accra, in Ghana, Lamas, in Peru, Santiago, in Chile, and Cuiabá, in Brazil), and also held a last meeting in São Paulo. Conceived as an artwork by Jorge Menna Barreto, the exhibition's restaurant unfolds notions regarding the relationships between human eating habits and the environment, landscape, climate and life on Earth.

=== 33rd Bienal, 2018 ===
The 33rd Bienal – “Affective Affinities” was held from September 7 to December 9. According to the general curator, Gabriel Pérez-Barreiro, this theme was inspired by both the novel Elective Affinities by Johann Wolfgang Goethe and the thesis of Brazilian art critic Mário Pedrosa titled "On the Affective Nature of Form in the Work of Art." The curatorial model was changed to include seven artists, with each curating their own exhibition.

=== 34th Bienal, 2020/2021 ===
Due to the COVID-19 pandemic, most events for this year were postponed to September 4 through December 5, 2021, with future Bienales to be held in odd-numbered years. The theme was "Though it’s dark, still I sing", reflecting the turbulent events of the time, from Amazon forest fires to the economic crisis and the pandemic.

=== 35th Bienal, 2023 ===
The 2023 São Paulo Bienal – titled "Choreographies of the Impossible" – sought to address and question activism, repressed cultures, and the art history of South America. Focusing on the history and consequence of colonialism and oppression, the majority of participating artists hailed from Africa, Asia and South America. To signal this break with tradition and hierarchy, the curatorial team was composed of four curators with no chief curator.

=== 36th Bienal, 2025 ===
The 2025 São Paulo Biennial, titled "Not All Travellers Walk Roads – Of Humanity as Practice", drew its title and inspiration from Conceição Evaristo's poem "Da calma e do silêncio" [Of calm and silence]. The image of estuary was proposed as a frame for the exhibition's central concerns of rethinking humanity, coexistence, and listening. The traditionally month-long event by an additional 4 weeks.

== See also ==
- Brazilian art
- São Paulo Biennial Foundation
