= Yolanda Mohalyi =

Brazilian painter (1909–1978)

Yolanda Léderer Mohalyi
- in her studio in the 1970s
- Born: 1909; Kolozsvár, Kingdom of Hungary now Cluj-Napoca, Romania
- Died: August 23, 1978 (aged 68–69); São Paulo, Brazil
- Occupations: Painter and stained glass artist

External videos
- “Yolanda Mohalyi”, MuN - Museu nacional do Conjunto Cultural da República; MAB - Museu de Arte de Brasília

Yolanda Léderer Mohalyi (1909 – August 23, 1978) was a painter and designer who worked with woodcuts, mosaics, stained glass and murals as well as more usual materials. Her early work was figurative, but she increasingly moved towards abstract expressionism. With artists such as Waldemar da Costa and Cicero Dias, she opened the way for abstraction in Latin American art.

Her work appeared in group shows during the 1930s, and her first solo exhibition occurred in 1945. In 1963, she was awarded the prize for best painter from Brazil at the 7th São Paulo Art Biennial. In 1965, her work was featured in a solo show at the 8th São Paulo Art Biennial. Mohalyi had solo exhibitions in Europe, Japan and the United States as well as Latin America. Her first major retrospective show was held at the Museu de Arte Moderna de São Paulo (MAM) in 1976.

Since her death on August 23, 1978, her work has been shown in solo exhibitions including those of 1979, 1982, 1984, 2008, 2009, 2014 and 2015. Her works are included in the permanent collections of the Art Museum of the Americas in Washington, D.C. (formerly the Museum of Modern Art of Latin America), the Museum of Contemporary Art, University of São Paulo (MAC), the Casa Roberto Marinho in Rio de Janeiro, and the Cleusa Garfinkel collection in Brazil.

== Career ==
=== Early life ===
Yolanda Léderer was born in 1909 in what was then Kolozsvár, Kingdom of Hungary (later Cluj-Napoca, Romania.) She studied at the Free School of Nagybánya and then attended the Royal Academy of Budapest from 1927 to 1929. Her parents were musicians. She learned bel canto singing and was a life-long lover of classical music, describing her later abstract work as musical.

In 1931, Yolanda Léderer moved to Brazil to marry a Hungarian chemist, Gabriel Mohalyi, who was employed there.

=== Figurative works ===
Already an accomplished artist, Yolanda Mohalyi settled in São Paulo, Brazil and taught drawing and painting. Among her students were Giselda Leirner Maria Bonomi, Eleonore Koch, and Alice Brill. Her earliest works were often vivid watercolors, with a sense of light and transparency, that show the influence of expressionism.

Many of Mohalyi's works from the 1930s focus on the human figure and show her concern for social injustice and the disadvantaged. In 1935, Mohalyi began to attend Lasar Segall's salon. Lasar Segall (1891-1957) made a deep impression on Mohalyi, strongly influencing her figurative work, which became darker and more sombre. Mohalyi's color palette became similar to Segall's, with a predominance of ochre tones in a dense and elaborate chromatism. However Mohalyi differed from Segall in her use of yellows. She displayed considerable skill in using oils to create luminous and transparent effects similar to her watercolors. The similarities between her work and Segall's were pointed out by critics such as Mario Pedrosa and Sérgio Milliet, who called for Mohalyi to develop her own style.

Around 1937, Mohalyi joined the "Grupo dos Sete" (Group 7) alongside Victor Brecheret (1894-1955), Elisabeth Nobiling (1902-1975), Rino Levi (1901-1965), Antonio Gomide (1895-1967), John Louis Graz (1891-1980) and Regina Gomide Graz (1897-1973).

World War II brought changes: in 1939 Gabriel Mohalyi lost his job, and the couple moved to Rio Grande do Sul for a time. A number of German-Jewish refugees were among Mohalyi's students, and some of her works from the 1940s, such as "Memórias" (Memories) reflect the situation of World War II refugees. Mohaluyi's first solo exhibition took place in 1945 at the Instituto de Arquitetos do Brasil (Institute of Architects of Brazil). It was positively reviewed by art critic Luís Martins.

In 1951 Mohalyi made her first woodcuts, studying with Hansen Bahia (1915-1978) in Salvadore. During the 1950s, Mohalyi used dark, saturated colors for her paintings, sometimes mixing dense, heavy paint with sand or other materials to create a rough texture. Mohalyi's works gradually became more abstract, particularly their backgrounds, and showed some influences from Cubism. She increasingly attracted the attention of international collectors.

Between the 1950s and 1960s, Mohalyi created stained glass windows for the Fundação Armando Alvares Penteado (FAAP) and frescos for the Capela do Cristo Operário (with Alfredo Volpi and others) and the church of São Domingo. Later, she designed stained glass for the Capela de São Francisco in Itatiaia.

=== Abstraction ===
In 1957, Mohalyi returned to Europe for the first time since she had left in 1931. In Arezzo, Italy, she was deeply struck by the paintings of Piero della Francesca, a fifteenth-century Renaissance master. By her own account, his work determined her to abandon figurative painting. She rejected the modernist movements of cubism and expressionism for pure abstraction. On her return to Brazil, she visited Lasar Segall, whose work had so tremendously influenced her. He implored her not to become an abstractionist; Mohalyi felt "she just had to". Segall died soon after, on August 2, 1957. From then on, Mohalyi rejected figurative art and definitively embraced abstraction. Increasingly, her canvases featured large forms of color freely overlaid with linear elements. Wide gestures expanded into increasingly larger spaces and loose textures. Combinations of colors often created subtle transparencies, giving her later works in particular a sense of luminosity.

In 1958, Mohalyi received the Leirner Prize for Contemporary Art, founded by Isai Leirner (1903-1962), a director of the Museu de Arte Moderna de São Paulo (MAM) and a founder of the Galeria de Arte das Folhas. In 1959, she participated in the Primeira Exposição Coletiva de Artistas Brasileiros na Europa.

Between 1960 and 1962, Mohalyi taught in the FAAP design and plastic arts course. In 1962, she represented Brazil at the first Bienal Americana de Arte in Córdoba, Argentina, where Sir Herbert Read chose her work for inclusion in an exhibition to visit the United States.

Mohalyi participated in multiple national and international exhibitions and almost all the international São Paulo Art Biennials between 1951 and 1967. In 1963, she was awarded the prize for best national painter in Brazil at the 7th São Paulo Art Biennial. She had a special room at the following Biennial in 1965. Throughout her life, Mohalyi exhibited widely, with solo exhibitions in Europe, Japan and the United States as well as Latin America. Her first major retrospective show occurred in 1976, at the Museu de Arte Moderna de São Paulo (MAM).

== Legacy ==
Yolanda Mohalyi died without heirs on August 23, 1978, in São Paulo, Brazil. Her friends Jürgen and Barbara Bartzsch were the executors of her estate. They catalogued her work and donated 50 of her paintings to the Museum of Contemporary Art, University of São Paulo (MAC). The works were selected by director Wolfgang Pfeiffer.

In 1979, a memorial exhibition of her work was shown at the 15th São Paulo Biennale. Her work was also shown in posthumous solo exhibitions in 1982 and 1984 at the DAN Galeria in São Paulo. DAN Galeria was founded in 1972 by J. Peter Cohn and Gláucia S. Cohn.

Mohalyi's work continues to be of interest in the 21st century. Art historian and curator Maria Alice Milliet has studied her work, curating exhibitions in 2008, 2009, and 2015. In 2008, an exhibit at the Oscar Niemeyer Museum in Curitiba focused on Mohalyi's lyrical abstraction. In 2009, a retrospective exhibition at the Pinacoteca do Estado de São Paulo covered Mohalyi's work from the 1930s to the 1970s.

In 2014, a retrospective of Mohalyi's work at the Museu de Arte Moderna de São Paulo (MAM) included more than 400 works. Wolfgang Pfeiffer presented a talk about her work.

In 2015, the retrospective exhibition Yolanda Mohalyi: A Grande Viagem at Dan Galeria, focused on around 50 of her works. The exhibition coincided with the publication of Yolanda Mohalyi : a grande viagem (Yolanda Mohalyi : a great journey) by Milliet and Margarida Sant'Anna, the most extensive biography to date about Mohalyi's work.

In 2023 her work was included in the exhibition Action, Gesture, Paint: Women Artists and Global Abstraction 1940-1970 at the Whitechapel Gallery in London.

== Books ==
- de Tarso Mendes de Almeida, Paulo (1976). Retrospectiva Yolanda Mohalyi : agosto/setembro, 1976, Museu de Arte Moderna de São Paulo... Parque Ibirapuera. São Paulo, Brazil: Museu de Arte Moderna de São Paulo.
- Amaral, Aracy (2008). O Museu de Arte Moderna da Bahia : textos Aracy Amaral. São Paulo, Brazil: Banco Safra.
- Milliet, Maria Alice (2008). Catálogos:Exposição Yolanda Mohalyi no Museu Oscar Niemeyer de Curitiba. Curitiba: Museu Oscar Niemeyer de Curitiba.
- Milliet, Maria Alice (2009). Yolanda Mohalyi : no tempo das bienais. São Paulo, Brazil: Pinacoteca do Estado de São Paulo, Governo de São Paulo.
- Milliet, Maria Alice; Sant'Anna, Margarida (2015). Yolanda Mohalyi : a grande viagem (Yolanda Mohalyi : a great journey). São Paulo, Brazil: Dan Galeria.
