= São Paulo Biennial Foundation =

Institution in charge of the São Paulo Art Biennial

São Paulo Biennial Pavilion
- Pavilhão da Bienal de São Paulo
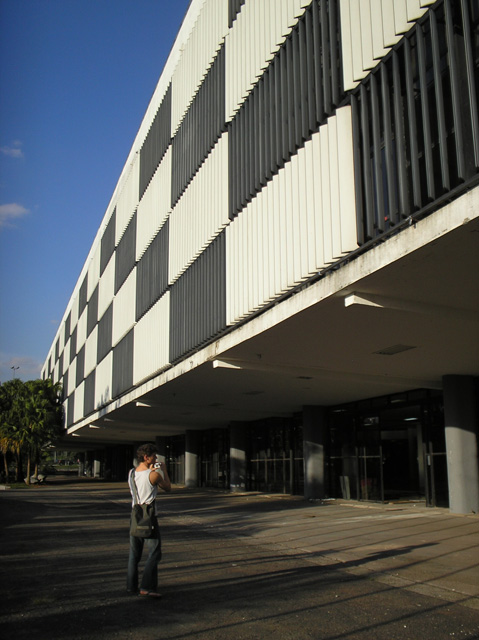
- Building of the Biennial Foundation, architected by Oscar Niemeyer, in Ibirapuera Park, in São Paulo.

- Location within São Paulo

General information
- Classification: Listed by CONPRESP, CONDEPHAAT e IPHAN
- Location: São Paulo, Brazil
- Coordinates: 23°35′16″S 46°39′21″W
- Inaugurated: 1954

Design and construction
- Architect: Oscar Niemeyer

The São Paulo Biennial Foundation (Brazilian Portuguese: Fundação Bienal de São Paulo) is the institution in charge of promoting and organizing the São Paulo Art Biennial, since its 7th edition. The Biennial headquarters is the Ciccillo Matarazzo Pavilion, also known simply as the Biennial Pavilion, and is located in the Ibirapuera Park in São Paulo. In the year 1954, Ibirapuera Park and its buildings, architected by Oscar Niemeyer, were inaugurated in celebration of the 400th anniversary of the city of São Paulo. The entire Ibirapuera Park and its buildings have been listed as a historical heritage site.

The Foundation was created in May 1962, after the 6th São Paulo Biennial, taking over the functions until then in charge of the São Paulo Museum of Modern Art (MAM).

== History ==
=== Foundation ===
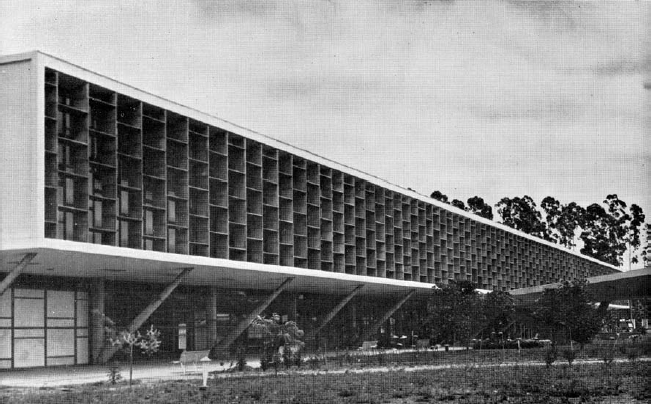
Palace of States, 1956.

The founder of the Biennial, Francisco Matarazzo Sobrinho (Ciccillo Matarazzo) and nephew of one of Brazil's greatest entrepreneurs, Francisco Matarazzo, had his wish to set up a museum of modern art in São Paulo after strengthening relationships with intellectuals and artists in the mid-1940s. With the help of Nelson Rockefeller, he managed to establish an agreement with the Museum of Modern Art (MoMA), an important museum located in New York City, to build a similar project in Brazil. Thus, the MAM institute is founded in 1949 in São Paulo. In 1951, Matarazzo managed to hold the first edition of the São Paulo Art Biennial, an exhibition still linked to the MAM, which took place on Paulista Avenue. The project receives the help of the artistic directors of the first biennials, Sérgio Milliet and Gomes Machado, and in 1962 the Biennial is separated from MAM and transferred directly to the Biennial Pavilion in Ibirapuera Park, where it is today. The Biennial Pavilion was a project by architect Oscar Niemeyer and inaugurated with the Ibirapuera Park in 1954. The space, which previously bore the name Palace of Industries, is part of the set of buildings designed by Niemeyer for the park to commemorate the IV Centennial of the city of São Paulo. Iconic buildings such as the Palace of Exhibitions (Oca), the Palace of Nations (currently the headquarters of the Afro Brazil Museum), the Palace of States, and the Palace of Agriculture (currently the Museum of Contemporary Art, in addition to the Biennial Pavilion itself) are part of the ensemble.

=== São Paulo Art Biennial ===
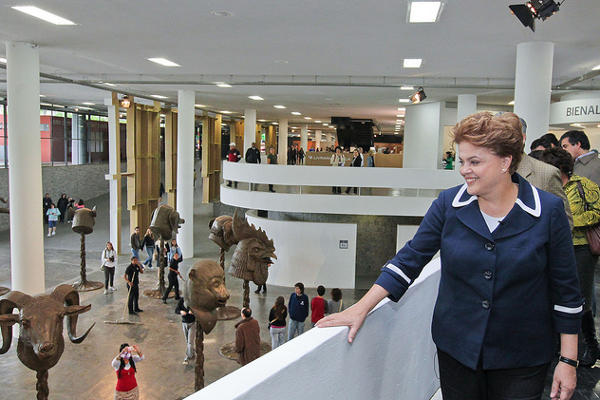
Dilma Rousseff, 36th President of Brazil, visits the São Paulo International Art Biennial in 2010 during her campaign.

From its seventh edition, in 1963, the International Art Biennial, until then held at the MAM in São Paulo, was held at the Ciccillo Matarazzo Pavilion. In 1969, during the military dictatorship in Brazil, many artists refused to participate in the Biennial, since the regime's repression had increased after Institutional Act No. 5. With the absence of Brazilian authors, the 1969 exhibition was considered the Boycott Biennial. However, because it received large funding from the federal government, the event was not considered an important site of resistance at the time. At the next Biennial, in 1971, many artists still refused to participate. With the absence of contemporary works, the organization of the event relied on historical works and brought works that were exhibited at the Modern Art Week, which took place in 1922. It was only in the 1980s, shortly after Ciccillo Matarazzo's death in 1977 and with the end of the military dictatorship, that the Biennial of Art regained greater prestige and featured works by important contemporary artists, such as Marcel Duchamp and Anselm Kiefer. Already in 1996, under the direction of Edemar Cid Ferreira, the exhibition featured works by historical artists such as Andy Warhol, Pablo Picasso, Edvard Munch and Francisco Goya. More than 8 million people have visited the 32 editions of the São Paulo International Art Biennial, which continues to this day.

=== SP-Arte ===
SP-Arte, the São Paulo International Art Fair, started in 2005 and all its editions have been held at the Biennial Pavilion. The event brings together more than 2,000 professionals and influencers in the sector annually, with representatives from all over the world. The fair lasts five days and has great influence on the global artistic agenda, since artistic concepts and the entire current scenario of the industry are discussed, bringing together trends. Several artists also participate in SP-Arte as exhibitors, which as of 2016 can also showcase trends in the furniture design market.

=== São Paulo Fashion Week ===
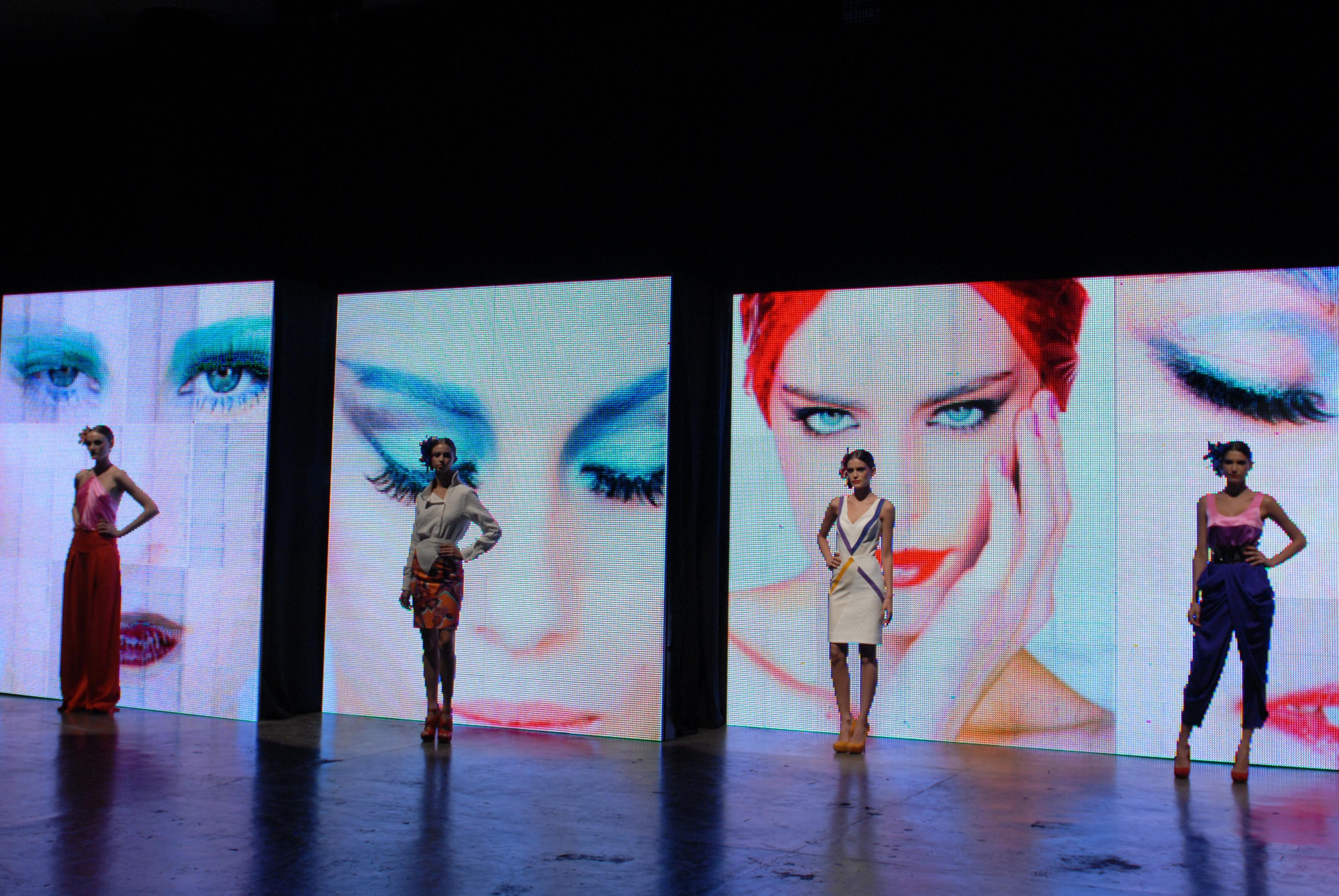
Make B make-up line show at the São Paulo Fashion Week in June 2011.

São Paulo Fashion Week, abbreviated as SPFW, is the main fashion event in Brazil and one of the biggest in the world. Each edition, an estimated 80,000 people, whether guests or professionals, participate in the event, generating an estimated R$1.5 million in business volume. It started as Phytoervas Fashion, considered the first big Brazilian fashion event and was organized by Paulo Borges and Cristiana Arcangeli in 1994. After Paulo Borges left Phytoervas Fashion, Morumbi Fashion Week was also created, an event with the same proposal and that gained a lot of strength and visibility in 1999. Two years later, the event was renamed São Paulo Fashion Week. In 2013, the event, which until then was usually held at the Bienal building, was transferred to Villa-Lobos State Park and then to Cândido Portinari Park in the following two years.

== Architecture ==
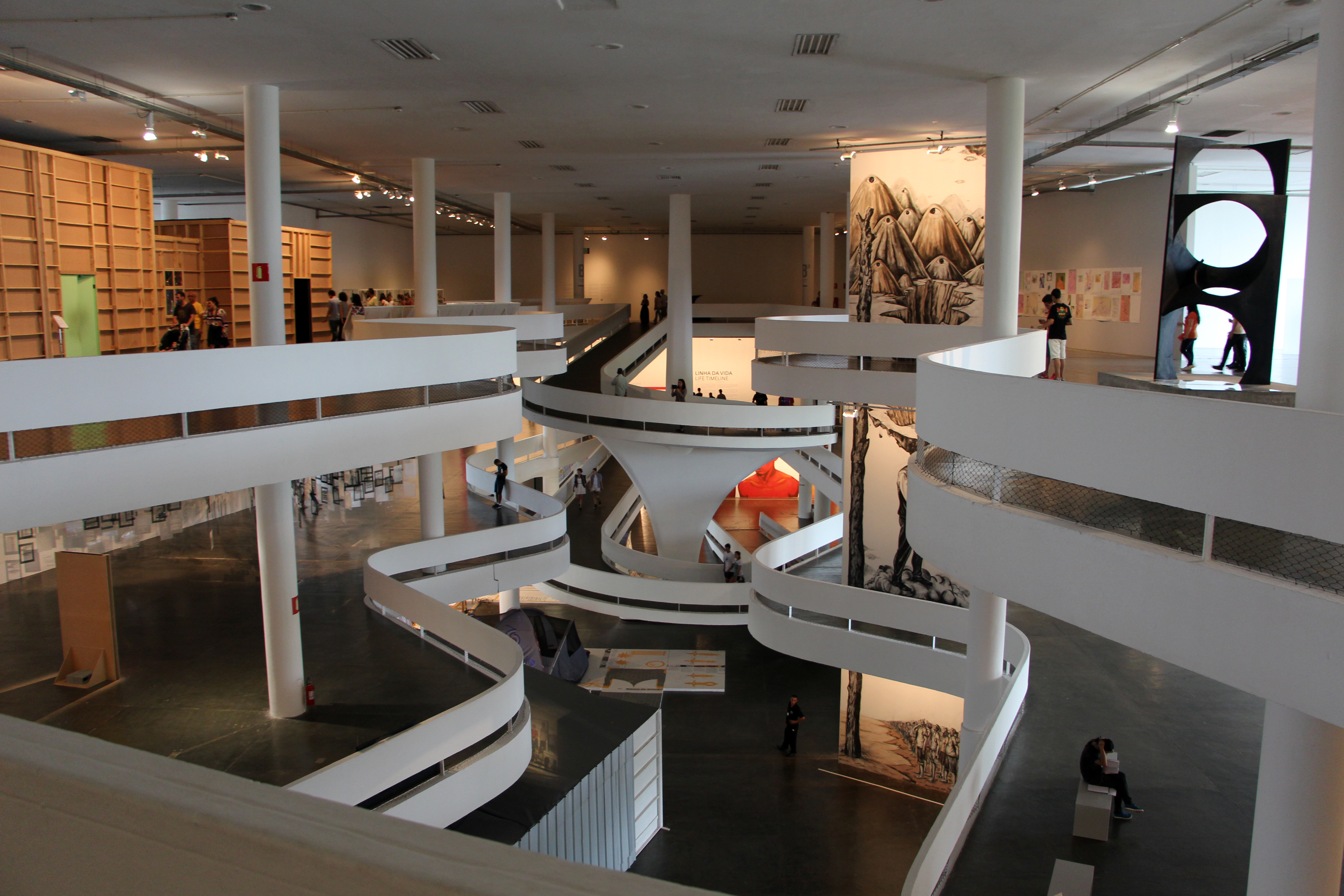
São Paulo Biennial Pavilion.

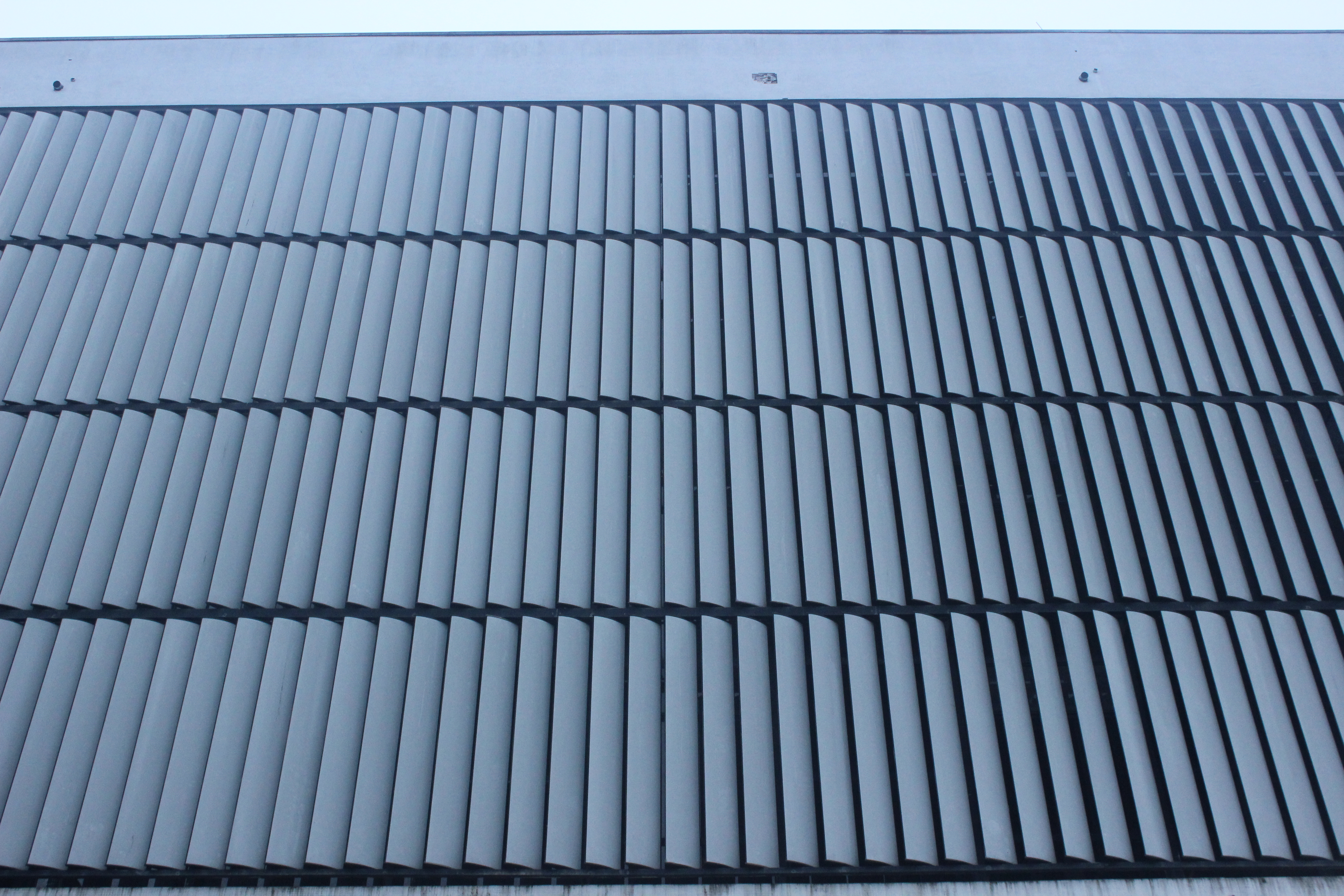
Biennial facade.

The Biennial Pavilion was part of the project to celebrate São Paulo's IV Centennial, with the inauguration of Ibirapuera Park and its group of buildings, which today form event spaces and important museums, such as the Oca and the Afro Brazil Museum. The plan was architected by the iconic Brazilian architect Oscar Niemeyer in 1954. The Biennial Pavilion is divided into three floors and an auditorium, totaling 25,000 m^{2}. The floors have one of Niemeyer's main characteristics - the curves, present in so many of the architect's other projects, such as the Ibirapuera Auditorium and the Copan Building, both located in São Paulo. The building occupies a space of 250 by 50 m and has a total constructed area of 39,800 m^{2}. The floors are connected by elevators, stairs, wide ramps, and escalators.

On its exterior, it is possible to see that the pavilion has vertical aluminum brises, which make up the facade. Currently, the Biennale Pavilion can be rented for events that have some creative relation, with arts, gastronomy, fashion, design, technology, among others.

== Historical and cultural significance ==
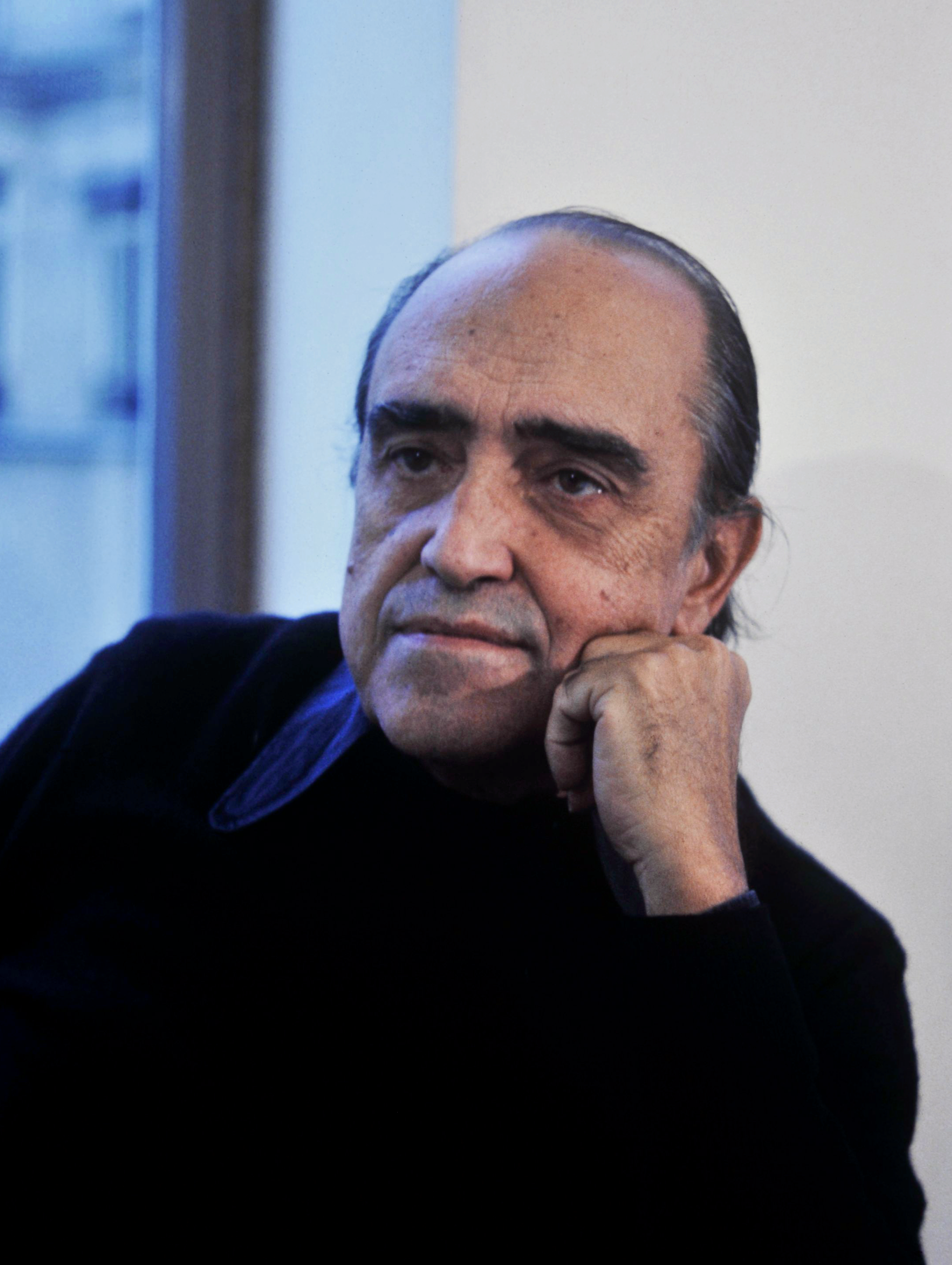
Architect Oscar Niemeyer in 1977.

Tombado como patrimônio histórico em nível municipal, estadual e nacional pelos órgãos CONRESP, CONDEPHAAT and IPHAN, o Biennial Pavilion é não apenas um marco histórico, mas também um espaço de extrema relevância cultural em São Paulo. As part of the Ibirapuera Park, which was inaugurated in commemoration of the 400th anniversary of São Paulo, and which had its buildings designed by Oscar Niemeyer and the landscape parts developed by Burle Marx.

=== Heritage status ===
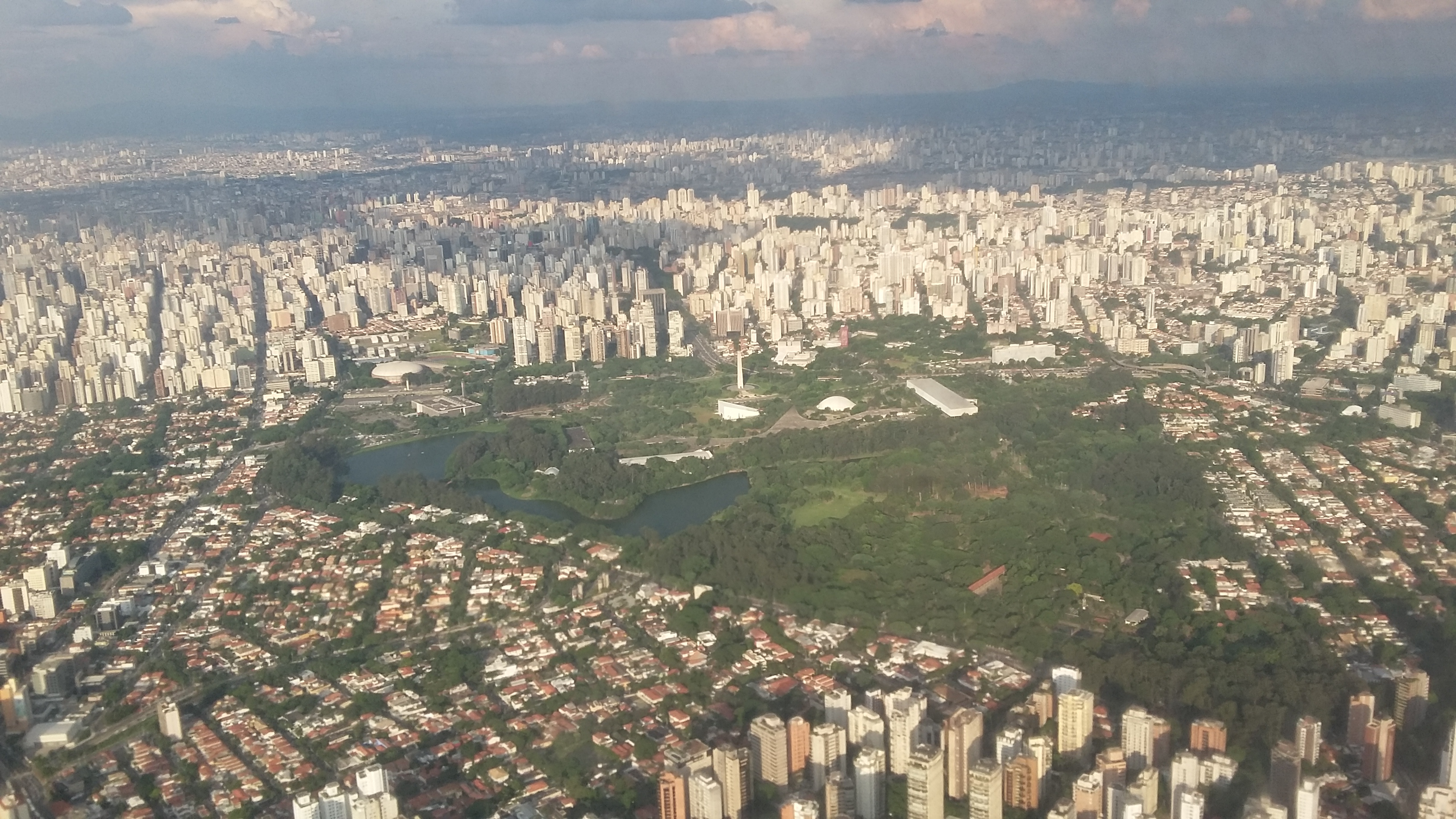
Panoramic view of Ibirapuera Park.

With the process started in 1983 by CONDEPHAAT, the entire Ibirapuera Park and its architectural project was considered a historical heritage site. At the time, several other parks and public spaces in São Paulo, such as Água Funda Park, Aclimação Park, Morumbi Park, Ibirapuera Park, Fernando Costa Park (Água Branca Park), República Park, and Buenos Aires Square, were declared heritage. Part of the population believed that Ibirapuera Park was not well preserved and that the construction of new buildings, such as the City Hall headquarters, the Detran and Prodam buildings, threatened the environmental character of the place. It was also with the construction of a space for the elderly, the so-called Geroparque, that associations got together to request the toppling of the area, so that new interventions would be prevented.

The Brazilian Association of Architects and Landscape Architects (ABAP) requested CONDEPHAAT to initiate a heritage listing process, claiming that the park was suffering from "inadequate interventions". In the same year, a debate was mediated by Folha de S.Paulo entitled "We Want Ibirapuera Park Back", where possible actions to be taken for the preservation of the area were discussed. At the event, the then Municipal Secretary of Culture, Fábio Magalhães, suggested that the Biennial building should be demolished to create a large open space for cultural activities. In November 1987, the then mayor of São Paulo, Jânio Quadros, sent a letter to the president of CONDEPHAAT, Paulo de Mello Bastos, stating that he did not admit the site's listing. During this period, the mayor authorized works for a tunnel connecting Morumbi to 23 de Maio Avenue. The works were interrupted, since the road would pass under the Ibirapuera, which would not be allowed due to the listing. He also declared that if it wasn't for his work as councilman, Ibirapuera Park would be a soccer stadium. However, Paulo de Mello later declared to O Estado de S. Paulo that, legally, Jânio Quadros could not impede the process. Milton Gordo, judge of the 5th State Treasury Court, granted an injunction prohibiting the works from going forward.

== Gallery ==
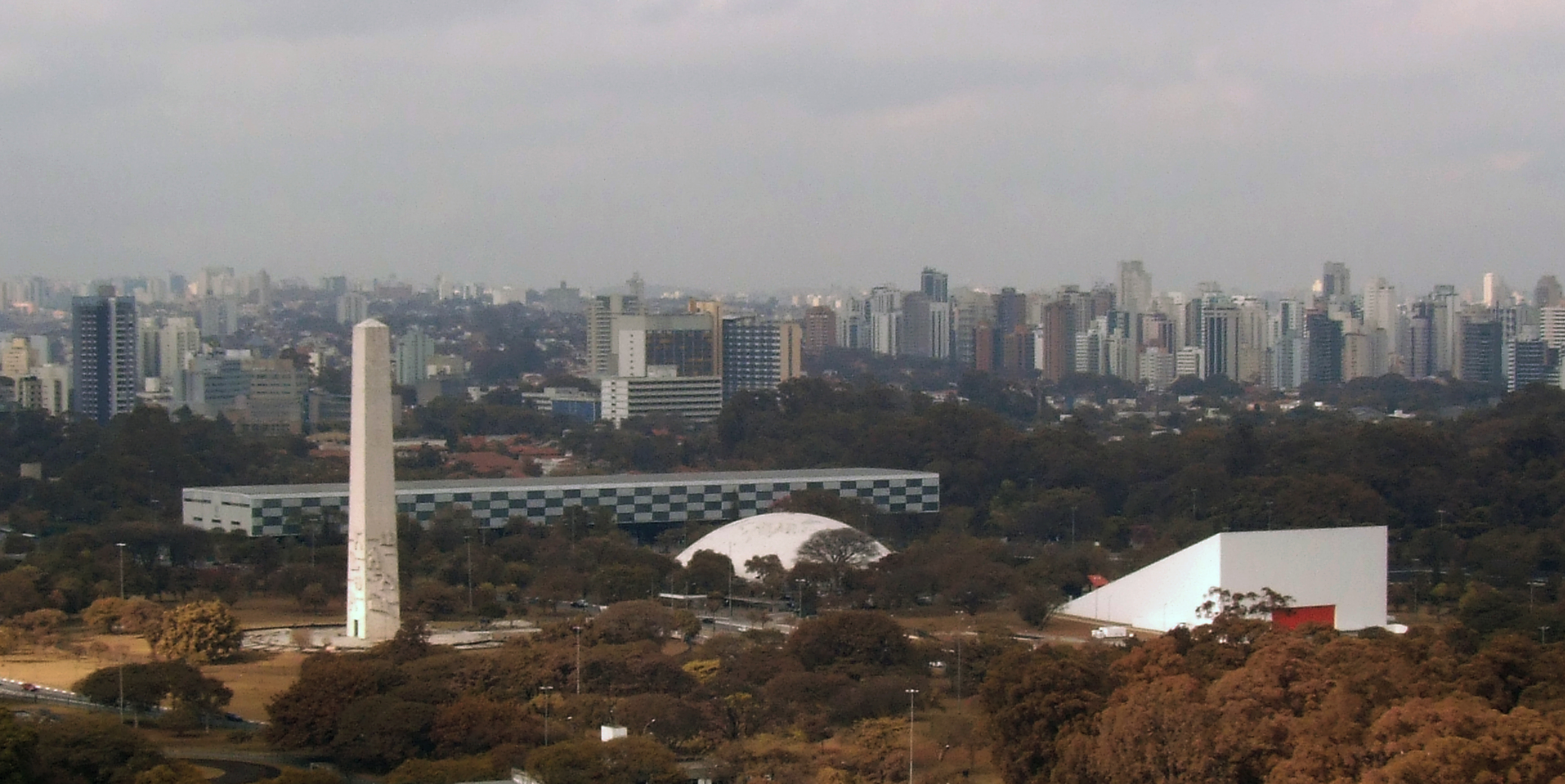
Bienal Pavilion, Oca, Ibirapuera Auditorium and Obelisk, located at Ibirapuera Park.

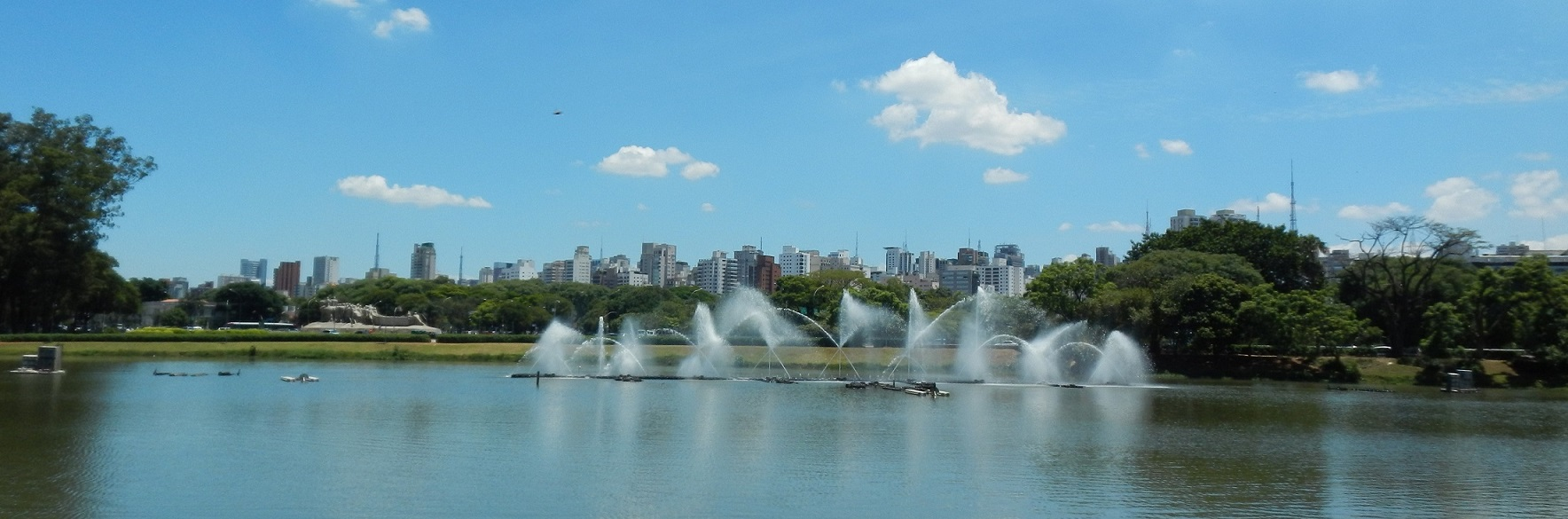
Ibirapuera Park.

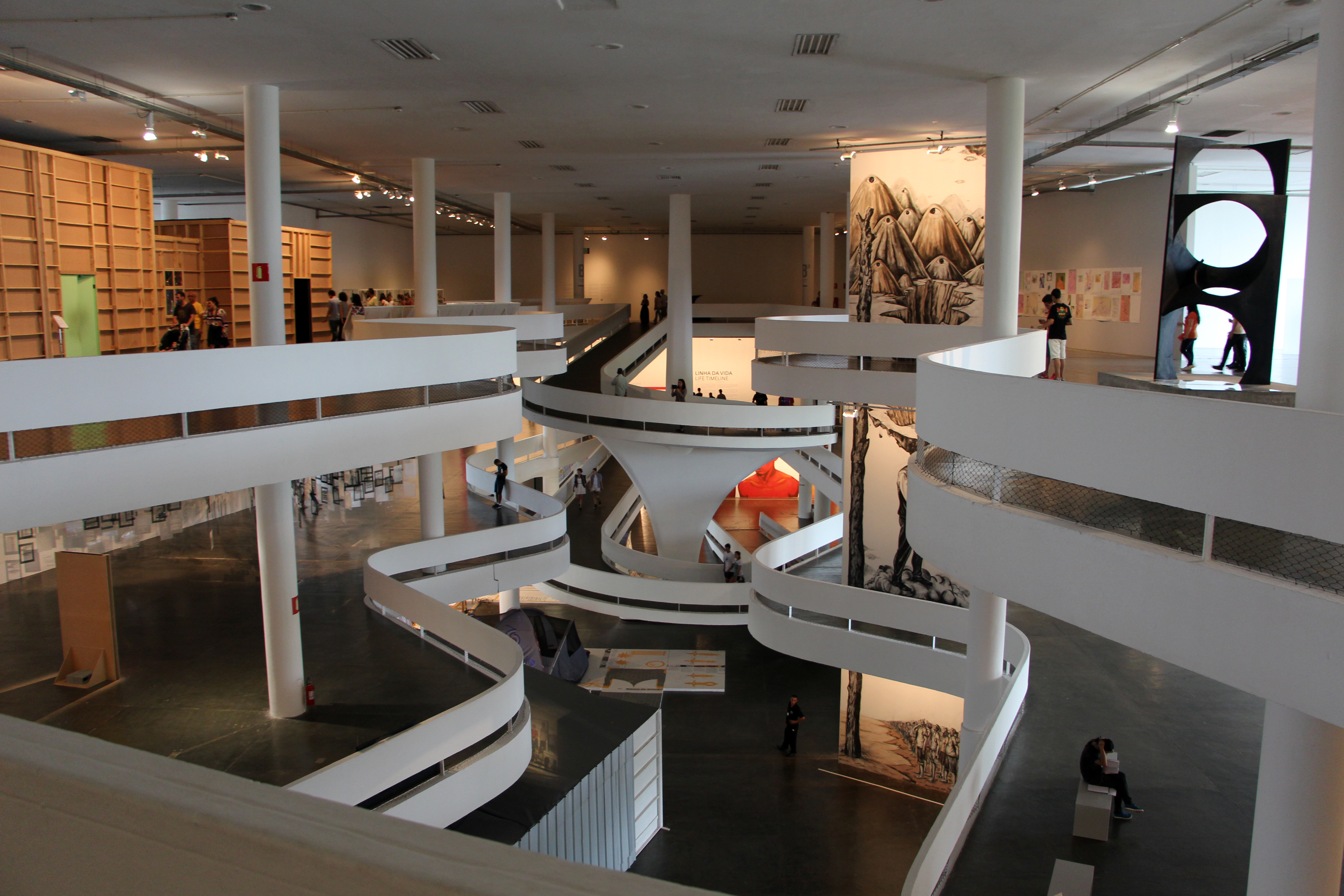
Biennial Pavilion during a São Paulo International Art Biennial.

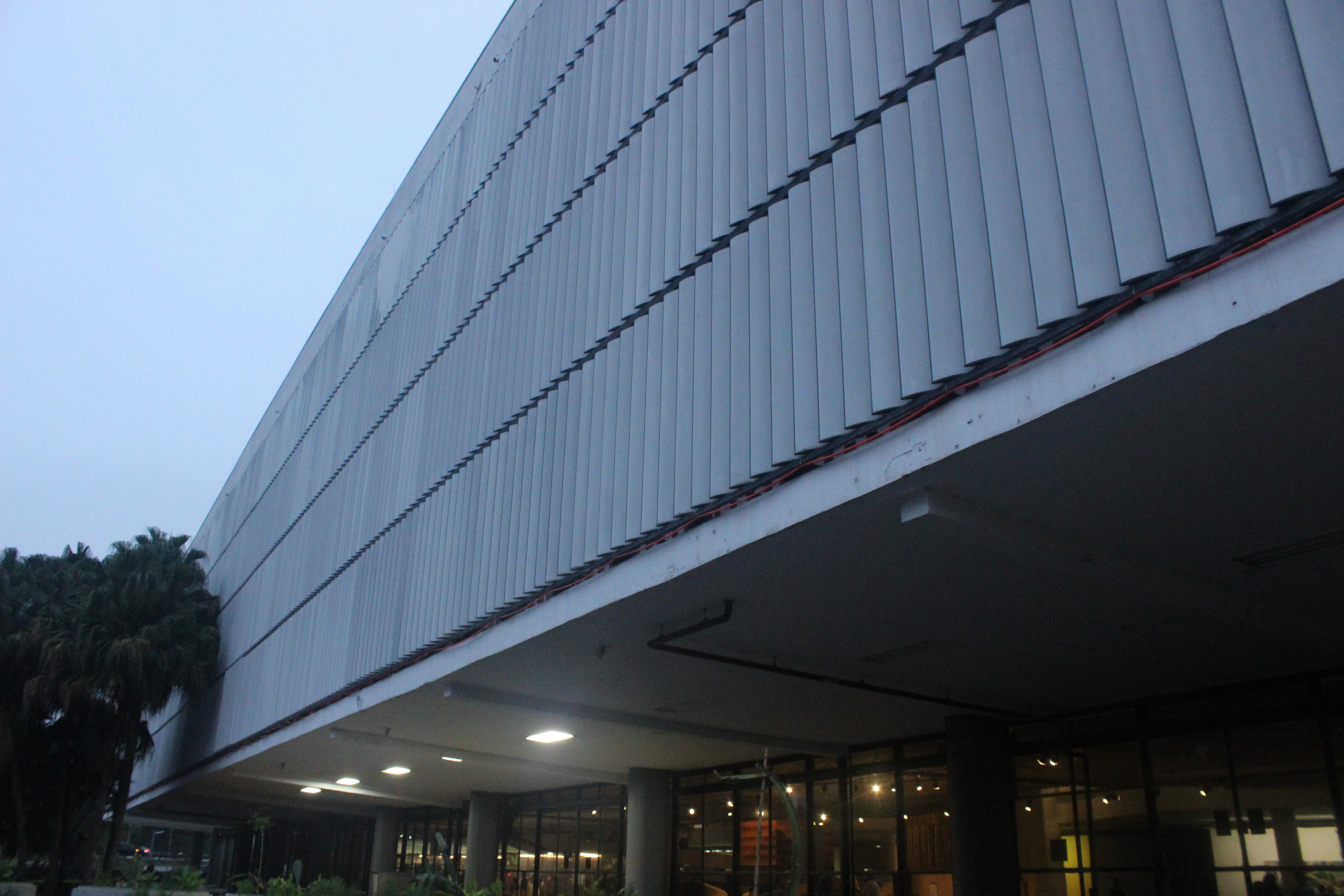
External view of the Biennial Pavilion.

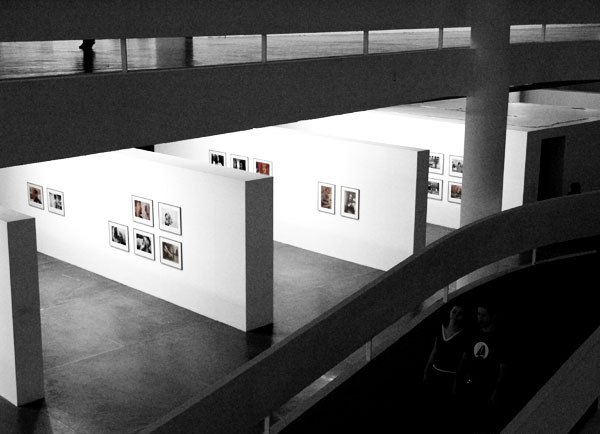
27th São Paulo International Art Biennial, in 2006.

== See also ==
- São Paulo Art Biennial
- Oscar Niemeyer
- Ciccillo Matarazzo
- Ibirapuera Park
- Museum of Contemporary Art, University of São Paulo
- São Paulo Museum of Modern Art
- São Paulo Fashion Week
