= Cybèle Varela =

Brazilian artist

- Born: 1943 (age 82–83); Petrópolis
- Known for: Painting, Video art, Photography

Cybèle Varela (born 1943, Petrópolis) is a Brazilian mixed-media artist. She is a painter, video artist, and photographer.

== Career ==
From 1962 to 1966, Cybèle Varela studied visual arts at the Museum of Modern Art in Rio de Janeiro.

She began her career as a painter and sculptor, winning the Young Contemporary Art Prize at the Museum of Contemporary Art, University of São Paulo in 1967 with the triptych: "Of all that could have been, but that wasn’t". The same year she exhibited for the first time at the Sao Paulo Art Biennial.

Varela was awarded a scholarship by the French government to study in Paris at the Ecole du Louvre in 1968–69. In 1971-72 she stayed at the Cité internationale des arts, and in 1976-78 studied at the École Pratique des Hautes Études.

The French art critic Pierre Restany wrote “Cybèle Varela does not paint landscapes. The utter commonplace of the mirror-image is for her nothing but a pretext”.

In Geneva in the 1980s, her work focused on themes from nature, in the 1990s it became more figurative, augmented with photography, digital printing and video, and since 2000 has moved towards pop surrealism.

In 1997, the Brazilian Government donated one of her paintings to the United Nations.

== Exhibitions (selected) ==
- "elles@centrepompidou": National Modern Art Museum, Paris, 2009
- "Outros 60's": Museum of Contemporary Art, Curitiba, 2006
- São Paulo Museum of Modern Art: 2005
- National Museum of Fine Arts: Rio de Janeiro, 2003
- Art Museum of the Americas: Washington DC, 1987
- Sao Paulo Biennal: Brazil, 1981
- Cantonal Museum of Fine Arts, Lausanne, 1980
- "Mix-media": Musée Rath, Geneva, 1980
- São Paulo Biennale: Brazil, 1969
- São Paulo Biennal: Brazil, 1967
- Museum of Modern Art: Rio de Janeiro, 1964

== Sources and further reading ==
- Benezit, E. Dictionary of Artists. Paris : Grund, 2006.
- Cavalcanti, Carlos and Ayala, Walmir (ed). Dicionario brasileiro de artistas plasticos. Brasilia : MEC/INL, 1973–1980.
- Cybèle Varela : peintures, 1960-1984: Jean-Jacques Lévêque, Frederico Morais, Jean-Luc Chalumeau and Pierre Restany. Geneva : Imprimerie Genevoise S.A., 1984.
- Cybèle Varela, Surroundings. Rio de Janeiro, MNBA, 2003.
- Cybèle Varela. Bruno Mantura and Cybèle Varela. Rome : Gangemi, 2007. ISBN 978-88-492-1226-6.
- Jost, Karl (ed). Künstlerverzeichnis der Schweiz, 1980-1990. Zürich : Institut für Kunstwissenschaft, 1991.
- Leite, José Roberto Teixeira. Dicionario critico da pintura no Brasil. Rio de Janeiro : Artlivre, 1988.
- Leite, José Roberto Teixeira. 500 anos da pintura brasileira. CD-Rom, LogOn, 2000.
- Pontual, Roberto. Dicionario das artes plasticas no Brasil. Rio de Janeiro : Civilizaçao Brasileira, 1969.
- Restany, Pierre (ed.), Les Hyperréalistes. Évreux : Centre culturel international de Vascoeuil, 1974.
