= Sheila Leirner =

French-Brazilian curator, writer and art critic (born 1948)

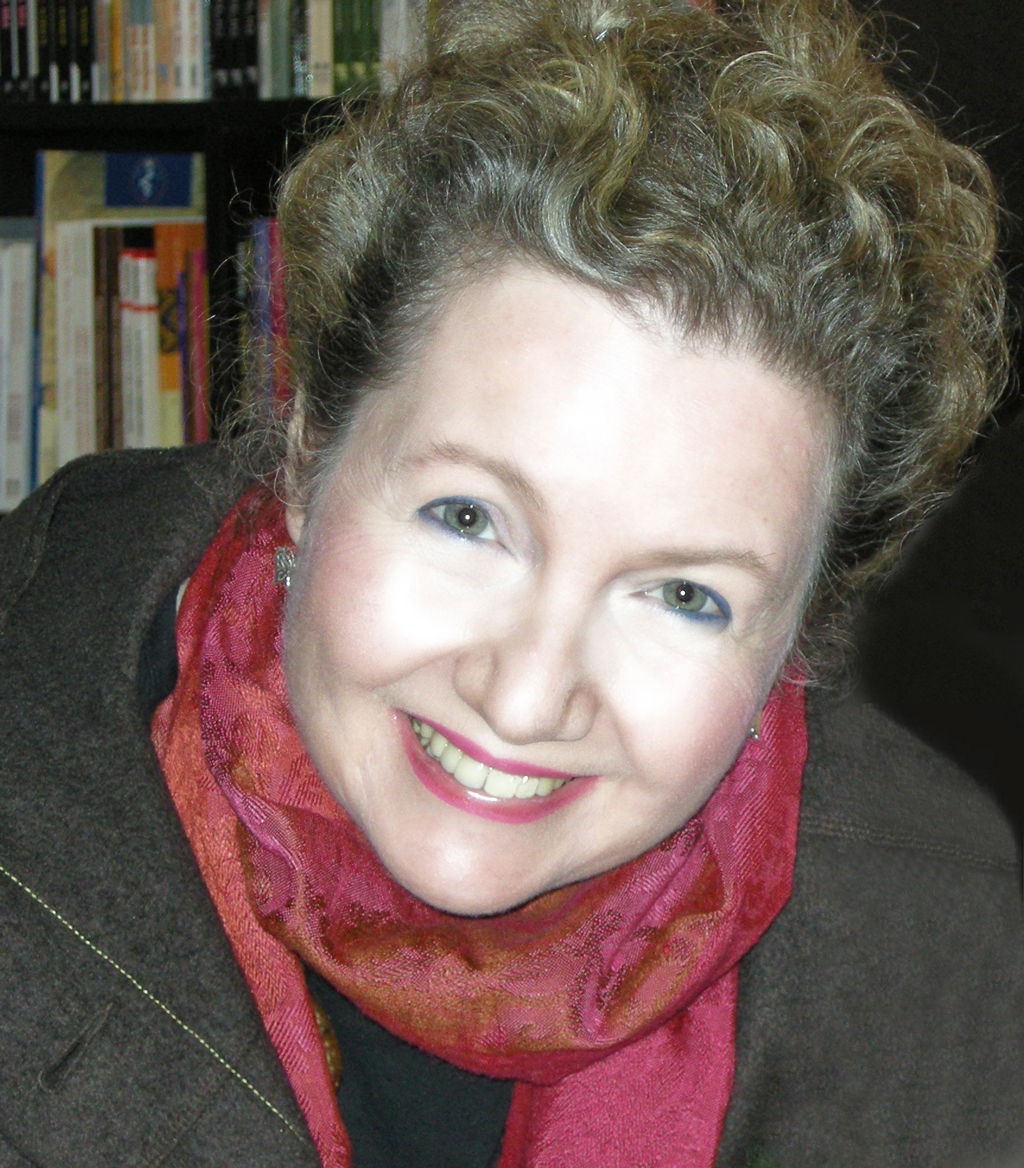
Sheila Leirner in 2009

Sheila Leirner (São Paulo, 1948) is a French Brazilian curator, journalist, and art critic, as well as a writer. She was chief curator of the XVIII and XIX São Paulo Art Biennials.

== Early life and education ==
Leirner's mother is the artist Giselda Leirner, and she is the granddaughter of the sculptor Felícia Leirner. Leirner studied the sociology of art in France.

== Career ==
In 1975, became an art critic in the newspaper O Estado de S. Paulo. She joined the Association of Brazilian Art Critics (Associação Brasileira de Críticos de Arte; ABCA), receiving the award Best Critic of the Year critic given by the ABCA and the State Department of Culture.

Leirner is a member of the International Council of Museums, representing the Galerie nationale du Jeu de Paume for Latin America from 1993 to 1999; the International Association of Art Critics (Association Internationale des Critiques d'Art, AICA); and, in 1992, became a member of the AICA's French section. She is the author of artist biographies, essays and translations published in journals and national and international supplements including D'Ars, Beaux Arts Magazine, Europe Magazine Littéraire, DNA, Revista da USP, Folha de S.Paulo, Cadernos de Literatura Brasileira, among others.

Leirner is a curator of exhibitions, as well as jury member and guest lecturer in Latin America, Africa, US, Asia, and Europe. She made the video Loving Trilogy (Trilogia Amorosa), which is part of the collection at the Museum of Contemporary Art, University of São Paulo. She was chief curator of the XVIII and XIX São Paulo Art Biennials (1985; 1987), obtaining the Artistic Personality of the Year award in Latin America, given by the Art Critics Association of Argentina, and the decoration Ordre des Arts et des Lettres of the French government.

Living and working in Paris since 1991, Leirner joined the international selection committee for the UNESCO Aschberg Bursaries organized by the International Fund for the promotion of culture; and the regional committee of the Ile-de-France, responsible for examining the projects of the French ministries of the Interior and Education.

== Selected publications ==
=== Books ===
- Visão da Terra. Participación en la antología de ensayos (Ed. Atelier de Arte e Edições, Rio de Janeiro, 1977)
- Arte como Medida. Colección Debates/Crítica (Ed. Perspectiva, São Paulo, 1983)
- Arte e seu Tempo. Colección Debates/Crítica (Ed. Perspectiva, São Paulo, 1991)
- Enciclopédia Arco Data Latino Americana. Coordinación general de la parte dedicada al Brasil (Madrid, 1993)
- Ars in Natura. Participación en la antología de ensayos (Ed. Mazzota, Milano, 1996)
- Horizontes del arte latinoamericano. Participación en la antología de ensayos (Ed. Tecnos, Madrid, 1999)
- Lateinamerikanische Kunst. Participación en la antología de ensayos (Ed. Prestel, Múnich, 1993)
- Leopoldo Nóvoa (Fundación Caja Galicia, La Coruña, España, 1999)
- Ausstellungskat (Composición). Con Alberto Giudici, Jorge Glusberg, Jean-Louis Pradel. Contribuidores Julio Le Parc, Pinacoteca do Estado. 96 pp. 2001
- Céu acima - Para um tombeau de Haroldo de Campos. Participación en la antología de ensayos (Ed. Perspectiva, São Paulo, 2005)
- 35 Segredos para chegar a Lugar Nenhum. Participación en la antología de cuentos (Editora Bertrand Brasil, Rio de Janeiro, 2007)
- O Surrealismo, with Jacob Guinsburg. Antología de ensayos, colección Stylus (Editora Perspectiva, São Paulo, 2008)
- Felícia Leirner. Textos Poéticos e Aforismos. Participación en la antología de textos críticos y biográficos (Editora Perspectiva, São Paulo, 2014).
- Direi Tudo e um Pouco Mais, Crónicas, colección Paralelos 34 (Editora Perspectiva, São Paulo, 2017).
- Como Matei minha Mãe, Romance (Editora Iluminuras, São Paulo, 2022).

=== Principal catalogs ===
- "I Trienal de Tapeçaria de São Paulo", presentación, Museu de Arte Moderna, São Paulo, 1976
- "Fantastic Art in Latin America", colectiva, Museo de Indianápolis, USA, 1983
- "3.4 Grandes Formatos", colectiva, Centro Empresarial Rio, Rio de Janeiro, 1983
- Participación en el catálogo de la colección del Museo de Arte Contemporáneo de la USP, 1984
- Catálogos de las 18ª y 19ª Bienales Internacionales de São Paulo, 1985 e 1987
- "Arthur A. Barrio", Kate Art Gallery, São Paulo, 1989
- "Painterly/Pictorico" (Brazil Projects/90), colectiva, Municipal Art Gallery de Los Ángeles, y Museo de Arte de São Paulo (MASP), 1990
- "O Pequeno Infinito e o Grande Circunscrito", colectiva, Galería Arco, São Paulo, 1990
- "A Forma Selvagem", Marcia Grostein, Museo de Arte de São Paulo (Masp), 1994
- "Los siete días de la creación", Instituto de Cooperación Iberoamericana, Buenos Aires, 1990
- "Joan Miró", comemoração do primeiro centenário do nascimento do artista, UNESCO, 1993
- "Ameriques Latines, art contemporain", Hôtel des Arts, exposição ligada à retrospectiva "Art Latinoamericain" no Centro Pompidou durante o quinto centenário do "Rencontre des Deux Mondes", Paris, 1993
- "Art Latinoamericain" (Art contemporain), coletiva, Musée Ludwig, Taschen, Colônia, 1994
- "Anna Maria Maiolino, Desenhos" - Galerie Debret, Paris, 1995
- "Iris Sara Schiller" - CRÉDAC - Centre de Recherche, d'Échange et de Diffusion pour l'Art Contemporain, Ivry-sur-Seine, 1995
- "Brazilian Sculpture - An Identity in Profile", exhibition at the IBD Cultural Center - inter-American Development Bank, Washington D.C. - USA, 1997
- "XXVI FIAC", (with Christine Frérot) Paris, 1999
- "Emaranhados", Anésia Pacheco Chaves, Pinacoteca do Estado de São Paulo, 2002
- "Caminhos do Contemporâneo 1952-2002", coletiva, Paço Imperial, Rio de Janeiro, 2002
- "2080", coletiva, Museu de Arte Moderna, São Paulo, 2003
- "Onde está você, Geração 80?", coletiva, CCBB, Rio de Janeiro, 2004
- Catálogos para as exposições monográficas "Julio Le Parc": Bienal do Mercosul, Porto Alegre; Pinacoteca do Estado, São Paulo; Galería Nara Roesler, SP; Museu de Belas-Artes de Buenos Aires; Museu de Belas-Artes de Mendoza.

=== Collaborations ===
- Caderno 2, O Estado de São Paulo, Jornal da Tarde, Guia das Artes, Módulo, Artworld/MundoArte (New York), Revista do Masp, Arcolatina (Madrid), Arte en Colombia, D'Ars, Bravo!, República, Vogue, Beaux-Arts Magazine, Ars, Revista da Usp, Jornal de Resenhas (Folha de São Paulo), Cadernos de Literatura Brasileira - Instituto Moreira Salles (Número 15, dedicado a Millôr Fernandes). (in Portuguese)

== Civil awards and decorations ==
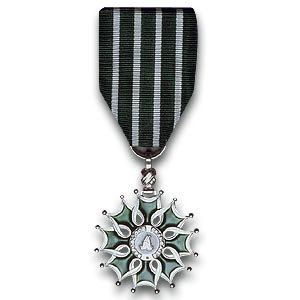
- Dame (Chevalier) of the Ordre des Arts et des Lettres, France (1991).

- Melhor Crítico de Arte ABCA (1976)
- Personalidade artística da América Latina - AACA (1987))
- Homenagem ABCA-AICA (2009)
- Prêmio Mário de Andrade, pela trajetória - ABCA-AICA (2014)

== Bibliography ==
- Amaral, Aracy A. (2006). Textos do Trópico de Capricórnio: Bienais e artistas contemporâneos no Brasil (in Portuguese). Editora 34. ISBN 978-85-7326-366-4.
