= Sérgio Ferro =

Brazilian painter, architect, historian and professor (born 1938)

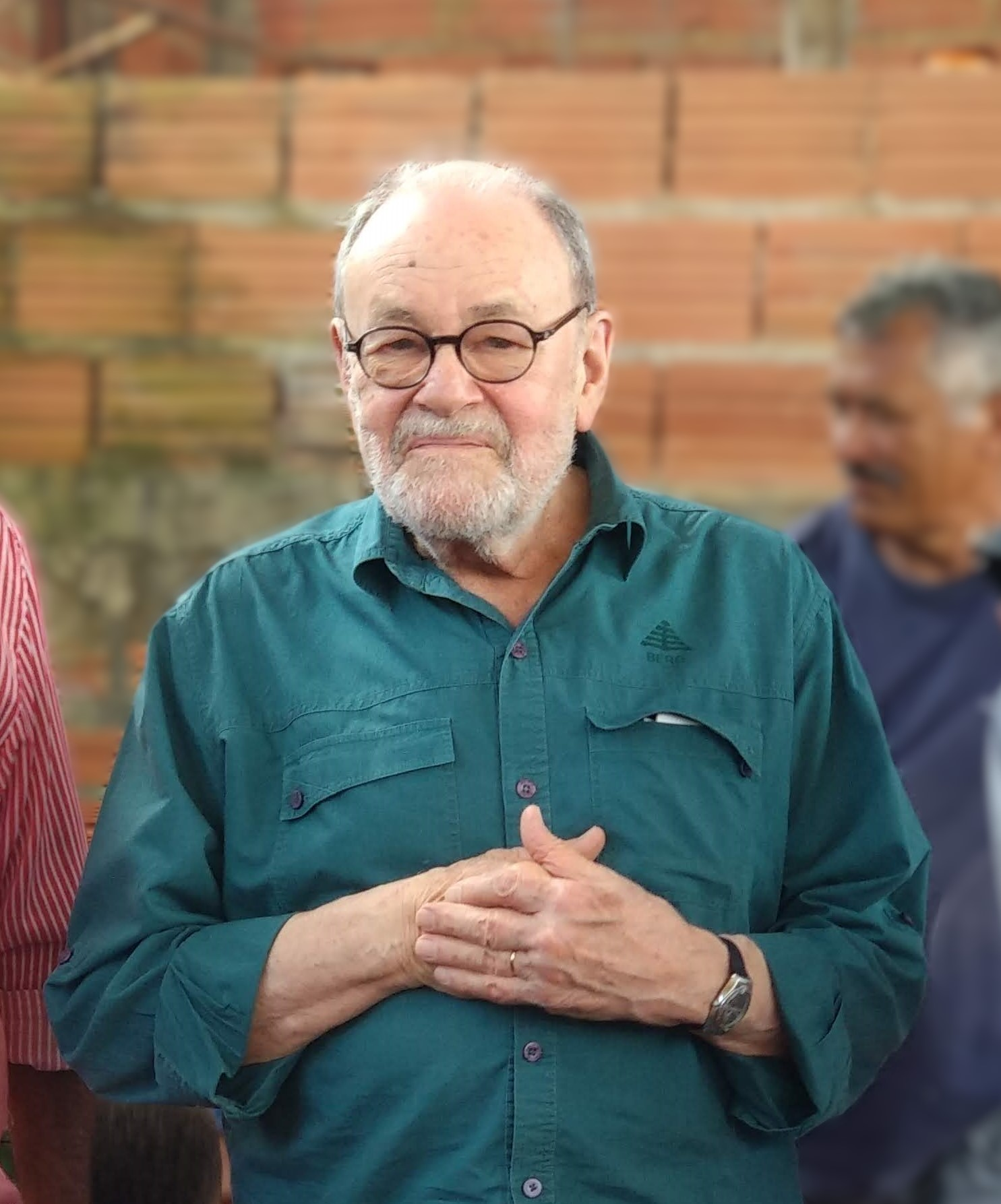
- Sérgio Ferro during a visit to the Braço Forte Cooperative in Americana, São Paulo, Brazil, in April 2023.
- Born: 25 July 1938 (age 88); Curitiba, Paraná, Brazil
- Spouse: Ediane Lobão Ferro
- Website: https://tftk.iau.usp.br/sobre/#sergio-ferro

Sérgio Ferro (born 25 July 1938) is a Brazilian painter, architect, historian and professor. He has been living in France since the early 1970s. He holds degrees in Architecture and Urbanism (FAUUSP) and in Semiotics (Mackenzie), with postgraduate studies in Museology and Urban Evolution (FAUUSP). He was imprisoned by the military dictatorship and, upon his release, went into exile in France.

== Career ==
Sérgio Ferro is the son of Armando Simone Pereira and Beatriz Ferro Pereira.

In 1962, Sérgio Ferro graduated in Architecture and Urbanism from the Faculty of Architecture and Urbanism at the University of São Paulo (FAUUSP). Shortly after, he was invited by Professor João Batista Vilanova Artigas to join the teaching staff as a teaching assistant in the Art History course at the same university. Until 1970, he taught plastic composition, art history, and aesthetics at various art and architecture schools and colleges in the cities of Santos, São Paulo, and Brasília.

His teaching career includes:

- 1962-1968 – Escola de Formação Superior de Desenho
- 1962-1970 – Faculty of Architecture and Urbanism, University of São Paulo (FAUUSP)
- 1969-1970 – Architecture Course, University of Brasília
- 1972-2003 – École Nationale Supérieure d'Architecture, Grenoble
- 1982 – Founded the Dessin/Chantier [Drawing/Construction] laboratory, which he directed until 1997.

Throughout his career, Sérgio Ferro observed and intervened in the spaces of civil construction, developing a critique of the production of visual arts and architecture based on the construction process and its agents: the construction site, technologies, materials, and the builder.

— Giovana Martino

=== Analysis of Architectural Production ===
In the 1960s, together with Rodrigo Lefèvre and Flávio Império, Sérgio Ferro co-founded the group called Arquitetura Nova (New Architecture) to understand the practice of architecture as a productive chain, including the social role of the architect and the production relations at the construction site. They proposed public housing policies with social housing projects, developing designs based on what they called the "poetics of the economy": simple experiences, optimizing procedures to increase productivity and access to housing. They were responsible for formulating a critique, based on the Marxist perspective of surplus value, of the institutionalized architectural production in Brazil in general and, specifically, as a theoretical counterpoint to the work and school of their former mentor, Professor Vilanova Artigas.

Every architectural object is the result of the process of capital valorization. [...] The architectural object, like the shovel or the weapon, is manufactured, circulated, and consumed primarily as a commodity.

— Sérgio Ferro

Sérgio Ferro continues to this day his critical reflection on issues related to architectural production, indicating that it reflects the economic relations of each era.

I am against the term Anthropocene. What is driving the world to final disaster is capital. To prove this, just look at the present. According to those who understand the issue, we no longer have time to avoid unimaginable climate disasters.

— Sérgio Ferro

=== Design and the Building Site ===
Ferro's critical writings, most notably O canteiro e o desenho (Design and the Building Site, 1979), analyze architecture as a medium through which capitalist labor is organized. He argued that architectural plans function primarily to coordinate atomized labor under capital, abstracting space and maintaining workers in fragmented roles.

=== Project TF/TK ===
Between 2020 and 2024, he actively participated in the international project "Translating Ferro / Transforming Knowledge into Architecture, Design, and Work for a New Field of Production Studies," developed through a Brazil/UK collaboration, funded by FAPESP (Brazil) and AHRC (UK). The project sought to promote the consolidation of a new field of Production Studies, structured by Sérgio Ferro's work, which is considered "a fundamental thinker for the field of studies and practices of architectural production, from both a critical and emancipatory perspective."

25 Affiliated Researchers participated in the project, initially focusing on translating selected works of Sérgio Ferro from Portuguese to English and debating them in reading groups in both English and Portuguese. This led to the development of various studies that will be published as booklets and books.

Additionally, part of Sérgio Ferro's collection of architecture, theory, and artistic practice is being organized, cleaned, cataloged, digitized, stored, and made available online, including projects and works from Arquitetura Nova (in partnership with FAU-USP). Much of this collection was donated by Sérgio Ferro to the Institute of Architecture and Urbanism at the University of São Paulo (IAU-USP), located in São Carlos, São Paulo.

== Military Dictatorship and Exile ==
During the military dictatorship, Sérgio Ferro, along with his Arquitetura Nova colleagues, established connections with the Brazilian Communist Party (PCB), which was opposed to armed struggle and guerrilla warfare against the dictatorial regime as a means of achieving a socialist revolution in the country. He later broke with the PCB and joined the Aliança Libertadora Nacional (National Liberation Alliance), led by Carlos Marighella.

Due to his political activism and the regime's persecution, Sérgio Ferro was imprisoned for a year. He was dismissed from the University of São Paulo and, in 1972, went into exile in France, settling in Grenoble.

Unable to practice as an architect in France, he dedicated himself to artistic activity and teaching in arts and architecture courses. Between 1972 and 1989, he taught at the University of Grenoble. During this period, he created frescoes at Villeneuve (1975), École Buttes (1981), and École Joseph Vallier (1983). His painting is characterized by unfinished images, clear references to Michelangelo and Leonardo, mixed with sketches and handwritten texts.

== Awards and Recognitions ==
- 1965 - Issue 319 of Acrópole magazine was dedicated to Arquitetura Nova.
- 1970 - Special Commissioner for the São Paulo Biennial Foundation in Venice.
- 1987 - Best Painter Award, São Paulo Association of Art Critics.
- 2012 - Title of Honorary Citizen of Paraná, from the Legislative Assembly of Paraná.
- 2021 - His name was given to the "Escola Livre Espaço Sérgio Ferro" of the Cooperativa Braço Forte.

== Works ==
=== Books ===
- 1979 - O Canteiro e o Desenho
- 1981 - Michelangelo: Notas por Sérgio Ferro
- 1985 - Teoria e Pratica 2
- 1998 - Michel-Angel, Architecte et Sculpteur
- 1999 - Futuro / Anterior (Nobel)
- 2006 - Arquitetura e Trabalho Livre (Cosac & Naify)
- 2010 - A História da Arquitetura Vista do Canteiro (Gfau)
- 2020 - Michelângelo: Arquiteto e escultor da Capela dos Médici (Martins Fontes)
- 2021 - Construção do desenho clássico (MOM)
- 2021 - Artes plásticas e trabalho livre I: de Durer a Velasquez (Editora 34)
- 2022 - Artes plásticas e trabalho livre II: de Manet ao cubismo analítico (Editora 34)
- 2024 - Architecture from Below: An Anthology (Mack Books)

=== Individual Exhibitions ===
Here is a list of individual exhibitions by Sérgio Ferro:

- 1963 - Galeria Teatro de Arena, São Paulo SP
- 1963 - Galeria São Luís, São Paulo SP
- 1965 - Museu de Arte do Rio Grande do Sul, Porto Alegre RS
- 1965 - Galeria Mobilínea, São Paulo SP
- 1967 - Fundação Armando Álvares Penteado, São Paulo SP
- 1973 - Galeria Fernando Milan, São Paulo SP
- 1974 - Galeria ZHTA-MI, Salônica (Grécia)
- 1975 - Museé de Grenoble, Grenoble (França)
- 1976 - Galeria Fernando Milan, São Paulo SP
- 1977 - Maison des Jeunes et de la Culture, Chambéry (França)
- 1977 - Galerie La Tete de L'Art, Grenoble (França)
- 1978 - Galerie La Tete de L'Art, Grenoble (França)
- 1979 - Galeria Murs Ouverts, Vence (França)
- 1980 - Galerie Saint-Guillaume, Paris (França)
- 1981 - Museu de Arte de São Paulo Assis Chateaubriand, São Paulo SP
- 1982 - Atelier J.Y. Noblet, Grenoble (França)
- 1982 - Castelo de la Condamine, Corenc (França)
- 1984 - Petite Galerie, Rio de Janeiro RJ
- 1984 - Rio Design Center, Rio de Janeiro RJ
- 1985 - Le Touquet-Paris-Plage (França) - Galerie Centre d'Art Plastique Contemporaine
- 1985 - Galeria de Arte São Paulo, São Paulo SP
- 1986 - Galerie J.Y. Noblet, Grenoble (França)
- 1987 - Galeria de Arte São Paulo, São Paulo SP
- 1988 - Galeria D'Art Contemporain, Le Touquet (França)
- 1988 - Galeria L'Entrée des Artistes, Barbizon (França)
- 1989 - Galerie Contrast, Bruxelas (Bélgica)
- 1989 - Museu de Arte de São Paulo Assis Chateaubriand, São Paulo SP
- 1989 - Galerie Contrast, Bruxelas (Bélgica)
- 1990 - Galeria J.P. Carlier, Le Touquet-Paris-Plage (França)
- 1990 - Galeria L'Entrée des Artistes, Barbizon (França)
- 1990 - Museu D'Art, Taiyan (China)
- 1991 - Galerie Contrast, Bruxelas (Bélgica)
- 1991 - Galerie Contrast, Lille (França)
- 1991 - Galerie Contrast, Metz (França)
- 1991 - Galerie Mann, Paris (França)
- 1991 - Galeria du Carme, Rouen (França)
- 1991 - Escritório de Arte São Paulo, São Paulo SP
- 1992 - Igreja de Saint Etienne, Ille-sur-Têt (França)
- 1992 - Galerie L'Entrée des Artistes, Barbizon (França)
- 1992 - Gallery Eleonore Austerlevz, San Francisco (Estados Unidos)
- 1992 - Galeria J.P. Carlier, Le Tduquet (França)
- 1993 - Galeria M & W, Hong Kong (China)
- 1993 - Hospici d'Ille, Ille-sur-Têt (França)
- 1993 - Galerie Le Monde de l'Art, Paris (França)
- 1993 - Escritório de Arte São Paulo, São Paulo SP
- 1994 - Espace d'Art Contemporain, Rouen (França)
- 1995 - Museu Victor Meirelles, Florianópolis SC
- 1995 - Votre Galeria de Arte, Rio de Janeiro RJ
- 1996 - Simões de Assis Galeria de Arte, Curitiba PR
- 1997 - Galeria L'Entrée des Artistes, Barbizon (França)
- 1997 - Espace d'Art Contemporain, Paris (França)
- 1998 - Galeria Le Monde de L´Arte, Paris (França)
- 1998 - Escritório de Arte São Paulo, São Paulo SP
- 1998 - Galeria de Arte São Paulo, São Paulo SP
- 1999 - Simões de Assis Galeria de Arte, Curitiba PR

=== Collective Exhibitions ===
Here is a list of exhibitions in which Sérgio Ferro participated:

- 1961 - Representou a FAU-USP no Concurso Internacional de Escolas de Arquitetura na VI Bienal de Artes Plásticas de São Paulo
- 1965 - Pintores de Vanguarda - Museu de Arte do Rio Grande do Sul, Porto Alegre RS
- 1965 - Opinião 65 - Museu de Arte Moderna do Río de Janeiro, Rio de Janeiro RJ
- 1965 - Propostas 65 - Museu de Arte Brasileira / Fundação Armando Alvares Penteado, São Paulo SP
- 1966 - 3 Premissas - Museu de Arte Brasileira / Fundação Armando Alvares Penteado, São Paulo SP
- 1966 - 7 Pintores - Galeria Aliança Francesa, São Paulo SP
- 1967 - Nova Objetividade Brasileira - Museu de Arte Moderna do Río de Janeiro, Rio de Janeiro RJ
- 1967 - 6 Pintores da Nova Objetividade - Instituto de Arquitetos do Brasil - Departamento de São Paulo, São Paulo SP
- 1967 - Mostra - Fundação Armando Alvares Penteado, São Paulo SP
- 1975 - La Ville - Université Grenoble Alpes, Grenoble (França)
- 1976 - Vingt Acquisitions - Museé de Grenoble, Grenoble (França)
- 1976 - Feira Internacional de Arte Contemporânea - Grand Palais, Paris (França)
- 1978 - Travaux sur Papier, Villeparisis (França)
- 1979 - 1º Art Actuel - Maison des Jeunes et de la Culture d'Annecy-le-Vieux, Annecy (França)
- 1979 - Expo 79 - Museé de Grenoble, Grenoble (França)
- 1979 - Volta à Figura - Museu Lasar Segall, São Paulo SP
- 1980 - 30 Createurs d´Aujourd'hui, França
- 1980 - Fête du Travailleur Alpin, Grenoble (França)
- 1980 - Les Travailleurs et les Arts - Chateau de Roussilion, Roussillon (França)
- 1980 - Communication Poesie, Rueil Malmaison (França)
- 1982 - Stockholm International Art Expo, Estocolmo (Suécia)
- 1982 - Octogone, Paris (França)
- 1983 - 10 Années D'Achisitions - Museé de Grenoble, Grenoble (França)
- 1983 - Architecture Et Arts Plastiques, Grenoble (França)
- 1983 - Les Larmes D'Eros - Galerie JC David, Grenoble (França)
- 1984 - Figuration Critique - Grand Palais, Paris (França)
- 1984 - Figure, Figures - Espace Gare de L'Est, Paris (França)
- 1984 - Pintura Brasileira Atuante - Espaço Petrobrás, Rio de Janeiro RJ
- 1985 - Exposition d'Art Contemporain, Bourgoin-Jallieu (França)
- 1985 - Brasilidade e Independência - Teatro Nacional Cláudio Santoro, Brasília DF
- 1985 - Coletiva MAC 2000, Paris (França)
- 1985 - 1960-1980: Autour de La Figuration Narrative - Musée de Valence, Valence (França)
- 1985 - 1960-1985: Autour de la Figuration Narrative - Musée de Valence, Valence (França)
- 1986 - Les Figurations - Musée d'Art Contemporain de Dunkerque, Dunkerque (França)
- 1987 - Linearte: Foire D'Art International, Gent (Bélgica)
- 1987 - Figurations d'Aujourd'hui - Maison Jeunes Culture - les Hautes de Belleville, Paris (França)
- 1988 - Figuration Critique - Grand Palais Bordeaux, Paris (França)
- 1988 - 63/66 Figura e Objeto - Galeria Millan, São Paulo SP
- 1988 - Eros e Thanatos - Pinacoteca do Estado, São Paulo SP
- 1989 - Mostra - Hotel de Ville - Musée de la Passion de Dunkerque, Paris (França)
- 1990 - Artexpo, Nova York (Estados Unidos)
- 1991 - Memoires de La Liberté - Centre Georges Pompidou, Paris (França)
- 1991 - Memoires de La Liberté, Tóquio (Japão)
- 1991 - no Museu Zacheta, Varsóvia (Polônia)
- 1992 - A Sedução dos Volumes: os tridimensionais do MAC - Museu de Arte Contemporânea da Universidade de São Paulo, São Paulo SP
- 1993 - Bienal de Arte Sacra, Roma (Itália)
- 1994 - Memória da Liberdade - Pinacoteca do Estado, São Paulo SP
- 1995 - Colóquio Arte Dor - Museu de Arte Contemporânea da Universidade de São Paulo, São Paulo SP
- 1997 - La Passion de Dunkerque - Vlaamse Kerkdagen, Bélgica
- 1997 - Casa Cor Sul - Simões de Assis Galeria de Arte, Cutitiba PR
- 1998 - Futebol Arte - Ministério das Relações Exteriores, Brasília DF
- 1998 - 5º Salão de Arte e Antiguidade - Clube Paineiras do Morumby, São Paulo SP
- 1998 - Acervo Galeira de Arte São Paulo - Galeria de Arte São Paulo, São Paulo SP
- 1998 - Futebol Arte, s.l., São Paulo SP
- 1999 - Destaques da Pintura Brasileira - Simões de Assis Galeria de Arte, Cutitiba PR
- 1999 - Desenhos e Gravuras: acervo MVM, Florianópolis SC
- 2001 - 4 Décadas - Nova André Galeria, São Paulo SP
- 2001 - 8º Salão de Arte e Antiguidade - A Hebraica, São Paulo SP
- 2003 - Projeto Brazilianart - Almacén Galeria de Arte, Rio de Janeiro
- 2003 - Israel e Palestina: dois estados para dois povos - Sesc Pompéia, São Paulo SP
- 2004 - 450 X 45 - Nova André Galeria, São Paulo SP
- 2005 - 10 Pintores Brasileiros - Simões de Assis Galeria de Arte, Curitiba PR
- 2005 - Caminhos Vários - Nova André Galeria, São Paulo SP
- 2007 - Parede da Fama - Nova André Galeria, São Paulo SP
- 2010 - Um Dia Terá Que Ter Terminado: 1969/74 - Museu de Arte Contemporânea da Universidade de São Paulo, São Paulo SP

== Bibliography ==
- ARANTES, Pedro Fiori; Arquitetura Nova - Sérgio Ferro, Flávio Império, and Rodrigo Lefèvre. From Artigas to Self-Managed Construction Groups. São Paulo: Editora 34, 2002. ISBN 8573262516
- KOURY, Ana Paula; Arquitetura Nova - Flávio Império, Rodrigo Lefèvre, Sérgio Ferro. São Paulo: Romano Guerra Editora / Edusp / Fapesp, 2004. ISBN 8531407834
