= Giselda Leirner =

Brazilian writer, illustrator, and plastic artist

- Born: 1928 (age 97–98); São Paulo, Brazil
- Education: Art Students League; Parsons The New School for Design; Universidade de São Paulo
- Known for: Illustration

Giselda Leirner (born 1928) is a Brazilian writer, illustrator, and plastic artist. She was born in São Paulo, Brazil. Her works have been exhibited at São Paulo Museum of Art.

Leirner went to the Art Students League and the Parsons The New School for Design in New York City where she took classes with Emiliano Di Cavalcanti, Yolanda Mohalyi and Poty Lazarotto. She earned a bachelor's degree in philosophy at the Universidade de São Paulo and has a master's degree in philosophy of religion.

== Books ==
- A Filha de Kafka contos, Ed. Massao Hono, Brasil (trad. fr. de Monique Le Moing :La Fille de Kafka, Ed.Joelle Loesfeld, Gallimard)
- Nas Aguas do mesmo Rio, Ateliê Editora, Brasil
- O Nono Mês, Brasil
- Naufragios, Editora 34, Brasil
