= Ciccillo Matarazzo =

Brazilian industrialist

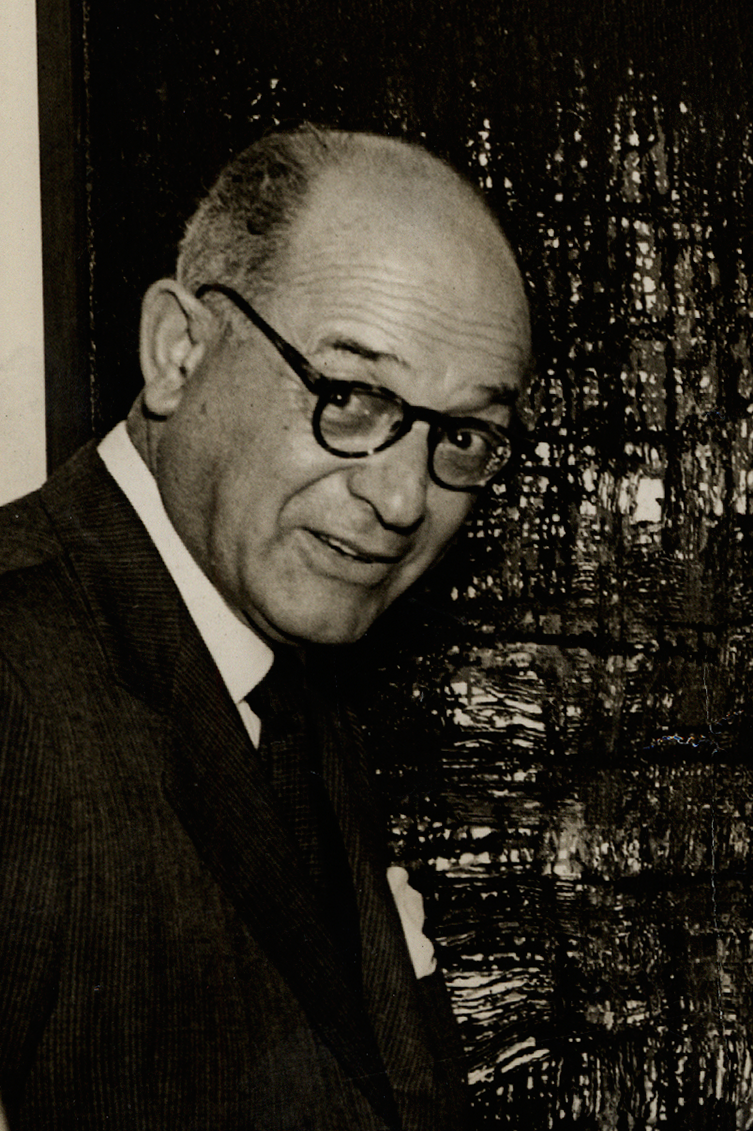
- Matarazzo, 1962
- Born: 20 February 1898; São Paulo, Brazil
- Died: 16 April 1977 (aged 79); São Paulo, Brazil
- Occupations: Industrialist; philanthropist; politician

Francisco Antonio Paulo Matarazzo Sobrinho (20 February 1898 – 16 April 1977), known as Ciccillo Matarazzo, was a Brazilian industrialist, founder of São Paulo Museum of Modern Art and São Paulo Art Biennial.

== Early life and family ==
Matarazzo was born in São Paulo. He was the son of millionaire Andrea Matarazzo, one of the brothers of Count Francesco Matarazzo. Matarazzo was cousin of Earl Francisco Matarazzo II, Ciccillo.

He interrupted his engineering course in Europe at the outbreak of the First World War.

== Career ==
The creator of the São Paulo Art Biennial and entrepreneur, Matarazzo became the main engine of modern art in Brazil. His name was present in all the events that streamlined the state capital in the 1950s, as the Brazilian Comedy Theater and Film Company Vera Cruz. In 1948, he founded São Paulo Museum of Modern Art and, in 1951, created the Biennial, in a style similar to that of Venice Biennale, which he visited several times. With the help of his first wife, Yolanda Penteado, Matarazzo could house a makeshift shed, hundreds of works from different countries she visited and convinced them to participate. In 1954, with the celebration of the fourth centenary of the city, which was also part of its organizing committee, the Biennale was able to gather important works such as Guernica, Picasso's huge mural. Powerful, authoritarian and possessive, until 1975, Ciccillo was solely responsible for the exposure, imposing its determinations and creating numerous areas of friction. However, at his own expense, was admittedly irreplaceable.

== Personal life ==
His first wife was Yolanda Penteado. When he was 74, Matarazzo married for the second time Balbina Martinez de Zayas.

He died aged 79 on April 16, 1977.

== See also ==
- São Paulo Biennial Foundation
