= Edemar Cid Ferreira =

Brazilian economist and banker (1943–2024)

Edemar Cid Ferreira (31 May 1943 – 13 January 2024) was a Brazilian economist, banker, and art collector. He was the founder and head of Banco Santos, which went bankrupt in September 2005. Ferreira was convicted in Brazil of bank fraud, tax evasion, and money laundering. He began serving 21-year prison sentence in December 2006. As part of the case, a judge ordered the search, seizure and confiscation of assets that were acquired with illegally obtained funds from Banco Santos. Ferreira assembled a 12,000-piece art collection while he controlled Banco Santos. Before his arrest, he smuggled his collection out of Brazil. The United States government seized items from a storage facility in New York that did not comply with customs laws. They returned Basquiat's Hannibal painting, a Roy Lichtenstein, a painting by Joaquín Torres-García, a Serge Poliakoff, and other works with an estimated value of $20 million to $30 million.

Ferreira died from a heart attack on 13 January 2024, at the age of 80.
