= Museum of Contemporary Art, University of São Paulo =

Art museum in São Paulo, Brazil

Museum of Contemporary Art, the University of São Paulo
- Museu de Arte Contemporânea (MAC) da Universidade de São Paulo
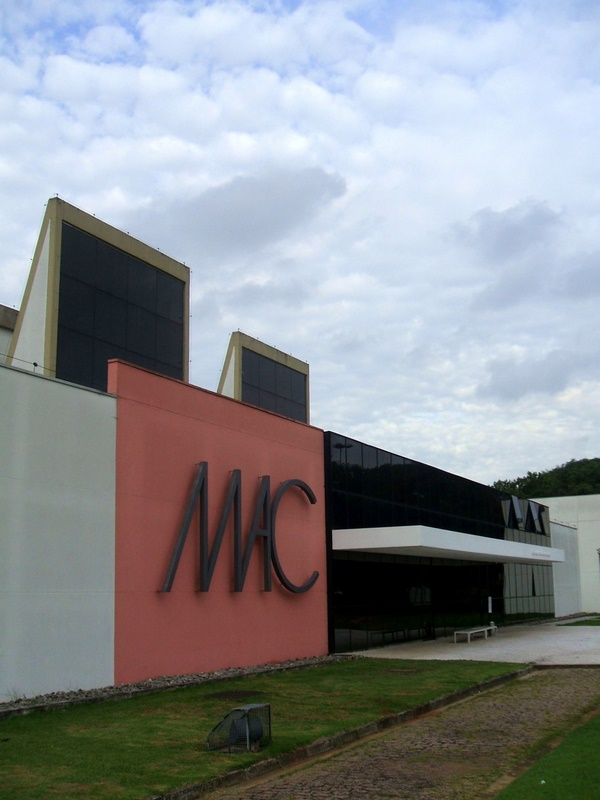
- Established: 1963
- Location: São Paulo, Brazil
- Coordinates: 23°35′20″S 46°39′4″W
- Collection size: 8,000
- Founder: Francisco Matarazzo Sobrinho
- Website: www.mac.usp.br

The Museum of Contemporary Art, University of São Paulo (Portuguese, Museu de Arte Contemporânea da Universidade de São Paulo) is a contemporary art museum located in the main campus of the University of São Paulo, in São Paulo, Brazil, and in Ibirapuera Park, in the same city. It is one of the largest art museums in the country.

== History ==
The museum was inaugurated in 1963, when the Brazilian industrialist and art collector, Francisco Matarazzo Sobrinho, founder of the São Paulo Museum of Modern Art, decided to close this museum and donate all of its holdings, along with his and his wife's private collection, to the University of São Paulo.

== Collection ==
The museum houses one of the largest and most comprehensive collections of 20th-century Western art in Latin America, with more than 8,000 works, comprising the most important artists, art movements, and tendencies of modern and contemporary art. Among many others, it keeps important artworks by Amedeo Modigliani, Umberto Boccioni, Marc Chagall, Pablo Picasso, Jean Metzinger, Joan Miró, Wassily Kandinsky, Tarsila do Amaral, Candido Portinari, Ismael Nery, Anita Malfatti, Helio Oiticica, and Lygia Clark.

Selected works from the Museu de Arte Contemporânea da Universidade de São Paulo
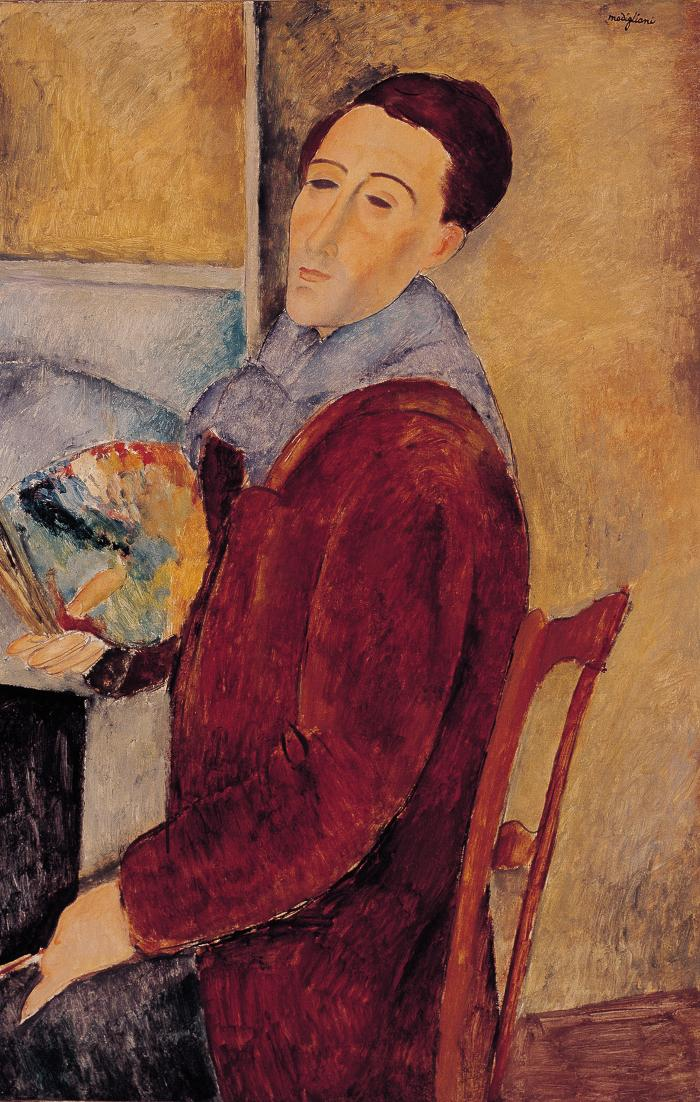
Self-portrait, 1919
Amedeo Modigliani

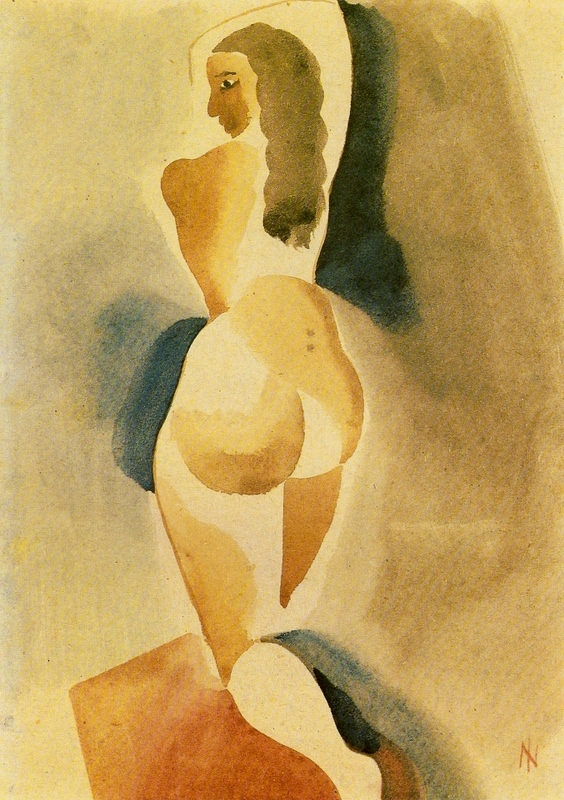
Nu, s.d.
Ismael Nery

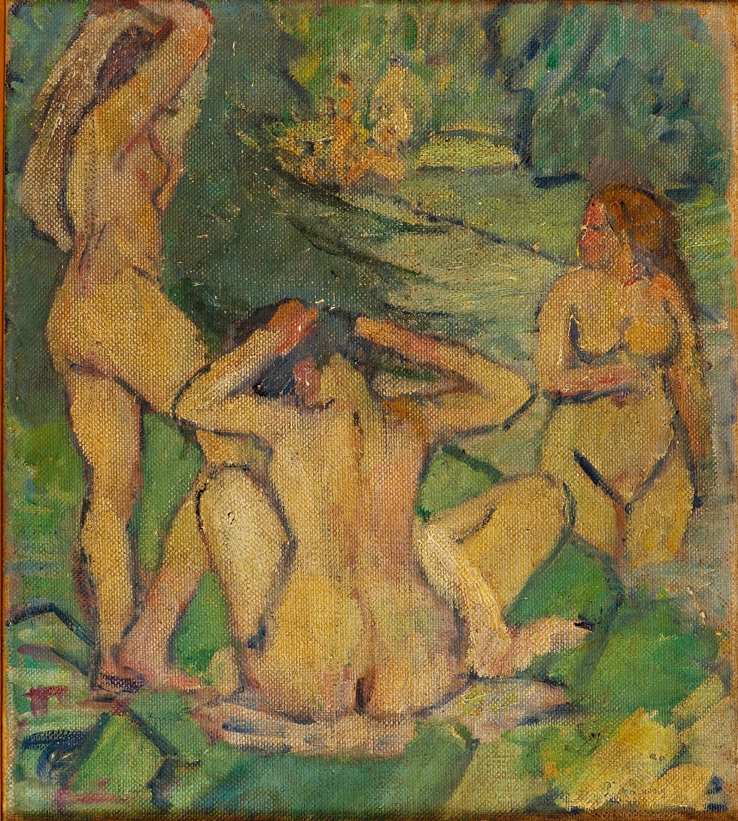
Mulheres à beira do riacho, 1915
Pietro Marussig

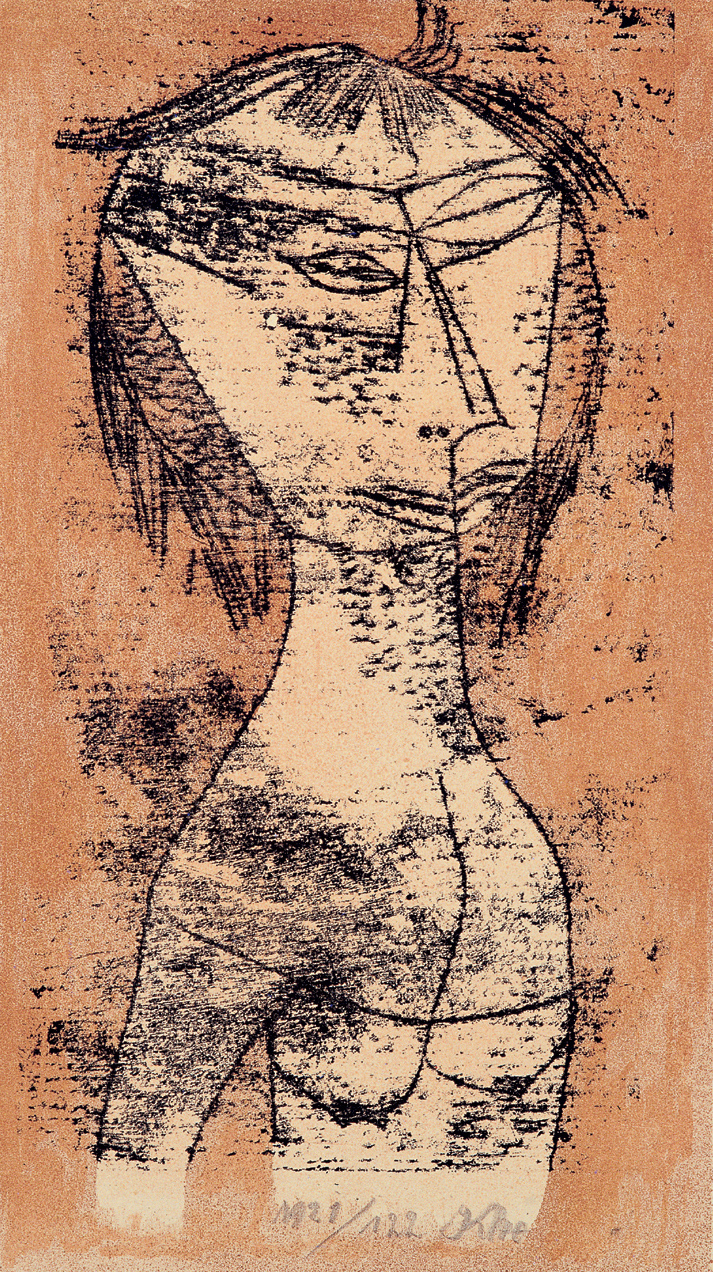
Die Heilige vom innern Licht, 1921
Paul Klee
