= Sérgio Milliet =

Brazilian artist (1898–1966)

Sérgio Milliet da Costa e Silva (November 20, 1898 – November 9, 1966) was a Brazilian poet, essayist, painter, literary and art critic, and sociologist. His 10-volume series Diário Crítico, a collection of essays, reflections, and poems, has been lauded a benchmark of Brazilian modernism.

== Biography ==
Born to a Portuguese merchant and to a teacher of French descent, Milliet moved to Switzerland as a child, studying humanities in Geneva. He graduated in economics and social sciences from the University of Bern. His first two books of poetry, Par le Sentier and Le Depart sous la Pluie, were written in French and published in Switzerland, where he was involved with the review Le Carmel. Upon returning to Brazil, he formed connections with people like di Cavalcanti and Mário de Andrade, which allowed him to participate in the Modern Art Week.

== See also ==
- List of Brazilian painters
