= São Paulo Museum of Modern Art =

Modern art museum

- Museu de Arte Moderna de São Paulo
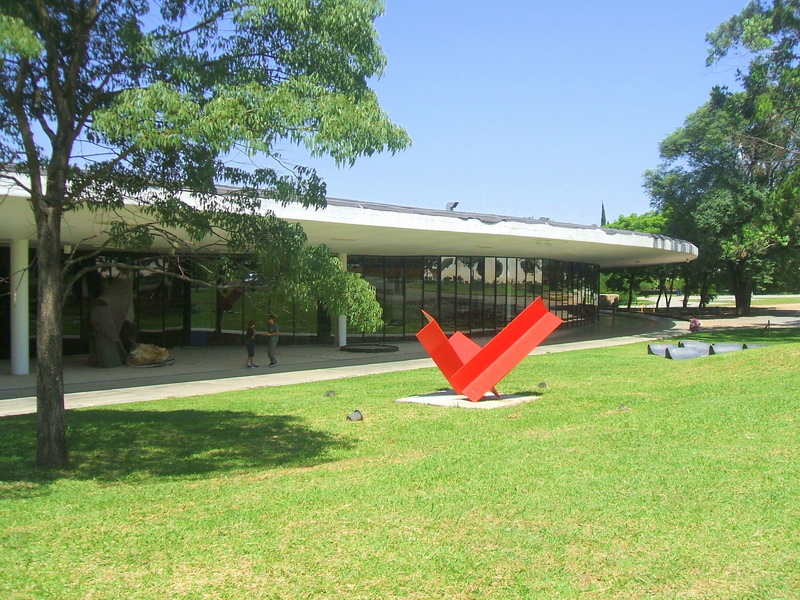
- Facade of the Museum of Modern Art of São Paulo
- Interactive fullscreen map
- Established: 1948
- Location: Ibirapuera Park, São Paulo, Brazil
- Coordinates: 23°35′18″S 46°39′19″W
- Type: Arts
- Director: Milú Villela
- Curator: Felipe Chaimovich
- Website: mam.org.br

The São Paulo Museum of Modern Art, (Portuguese: Museu de Arte Moderna de São Paulo, or MAM), is located in Ibirapuera Park, São Paulo.

Founded by Francisco Matarazzo Sobrinho and Yolanda Penteado, and built in 1948, the museum is modelled on the Museum of Modern Art in New York City. The Museum has a collection and includes more than 4,000 works by artists such as Anita Malfatti, Alfred Barye, Aldo Bonadei, Alfredo Volpi, Emiliano Di Cavalcanti, José António da Silva, Joan Miró, Marc Chagall, Mario Zanini, and Pablo Picasso.

Among those who studied at the museum was painter Sylvia Martins.

== The collection ==
The collection includes pieces by Anita Malfatti, Aldo Bonadei, Alfredo Volpi, Emiliano Di Cavalcanti, José Antonio da Silva, Joan Miró, Alfred Barye, Marc Chagall, Mario Zanini, Pablo Picasso and Raoul Dufy, among others. Most of them belonged to the private collection of Matarazzo and his wife.

== The museum's inaugural exhibition ==
The inaugural exhibition at the MAM, entitled From Figurativism to Abstraction, deepened a discussion that had already begun years before, on the opposition between figurative art (representation of nature), already considered retrograde, and abstract art (subjective), which would emerge two decades earlier in Europe, and be considered the avant-garde of the visual arts.
