= Günzburg (surname) =

Günzburg is a surname of Swabian origin. Ginsberg, Ginsburg, Gensburg, Ginsburgh, Ginzberg, Ginzborg, and Ginzburg are variants of the surname.

== History ==
The Günzburg (Cyrillic: Гинзбург Ginzburg, Гинцбург Gintsburg; Yiddish: גינזבורג Ginzburg, גינצבורג Gintsburg) family originated in the town of Günzburg, Bavaria. It is believed that the family went there from the city of Ulm, Württemberg, and that for this reason the best-known progenitor of the family and some of his immediate descendants, as well as certain others, called themselves "Ulma-Günzburg".

Some of the names (especially Ginsberg) are also Ashkenazi Jewish surnames. When, early in the emancipation period, the Jews of Russia and of Austria were ordered by their governments to adopt family names, it was natural that many of them should choose a name so respected and pleasing as that of Günzburg. There is on record a lawsuit instituted by Baer Günzburg of Grodno against a Jewish family of that city who had adopted the same name under the decree of 1804. The court sustained the right of Jewish families to adopt any name they chose, and the number of Günzburg families accordingly increased.

The name is composed of two German elements. Burg means "castle" or "citadel". This commonly was also used to describe a walled settlement or town, hence common usage in town names such as Hamburg (from Old German: Hammaburg, lit. "castle above the river bend"). The river name Günz is ultimately derived from the Indo-European root *gheu-, meaning "to pour". Thus, Günzburg refers to a "fortified town by the river Günz".

== Gunzburg, Günzburg ==
- Akiva Günzburg (d. 1597), German poet and rabbi
- Aryeh Leib ben Asher Gunzberg (c. 1695-1785), Lithuanian rabbi and author
- Asher ben Löb Günzburg (1754-1837), Chief rabbi of Karlsruhe, Germany
- Baron Joseph Günzburg (1812–1878), Russian-Jewish banker, philanthropist and communal leader
- Baron Horace Günzburg (1833–1909), Russian-Jewish banker, philanthropist and communal leader
- Baron David Günzburg (1857–1910), Russian orientalist and Jewish communal leader
- Baron Nicolas de Gunzburg (1904–1981), socialite, editor, actor, producer
- Johann Eberlin Von Günzburg (c.1470–1533), German theologian and religious reformer
- Mordecai Aaron Günzburg (1795–1846), writer
- Nico Gunzburg (1882–1984), Belgian lawyer and criminologist
- Milton Gunzburg (1910–1991), American screenwriter and inventor

== Gunzbourg ==
- Baron Philippe de Gunzbourg (1904–1986). French aristocrat and Special Operations Executive agent during the Second World War.

== Ginsberg ==
- Allen Ginsberg (1926–1997), Beat poet
- Alexandra Daisy Ginsberg (born 1982), British artist
- Asher Hirsch Ginsberg ("Achad Ha'am"; 1856–1927), Zionist writer and philosopher
- Benjamin Ginsberg (disambiguation), multiple people, including:
  - Benjamin Ginsberg (businessman) (1886–1944), South African businessman
  - Benjamin Ginsberg (lawyer) (born c. 1952), American attorney and lobbyist
  - Benjamin Ginsberg (political scientist) (born 1947), American political scientist
- Brian Ginsberg (born 1966), American gymnast, two-time US junior national gymnastics champion
- Debra M. Ginsberg (born 1962), British-born American author, book editor and book reviewer
- Donald Ginsberg (1933–2007), American physicist and superconductor expert
- Frances Ginsberg (1955-2010), American opera soprano
- Gary Ginsberg (born 1962), American lawyer and strategist
- Harold Louis Ginsberg (1903–1990), Jewish bible scholar
- Harold S. Ginsberg (1917-2003), American microbiologist
- Henry Ginsberg (1897–1979), American film studio executive and the head of production for Paramount Studios
- Henry N. Ginsberg (born c. 1944), American physician and professor
- Inge Ginsberg (1922–2021), Swiss lyricist, journalist and heavy metal singer
- Jodie Ginsberg (born c. 1978), American/British journalist
- Joe Ginsberg (1926-2012), American baseball player
- Louis Ginsberg (1895–1976), American poet and father of Allen Ginsberg
- Mandy Ginsberg (born c. 1970), American businesswoman and executive
- Marc Ginsberg, American violinist
- Mark C. Ginsberg (born 1950), American lawyer and former diplomat
- Mark Ginsberg, American molecular and rheumatological scientist and professor
- Mark R. Ginsberg (born c. 1953), American academic administrator and psychologist
- Matthias Ginsberg (born 1949), German politician
- Maury Ginsberg (born 1970), American actor
- Merle Ginsberg (born 1953), American writer, television personality and fashion expert
- Milton Moses Ginsberg (1935-2021), American film director
- Morris Ginsberg (1889–1970), British sociologist
- Naomi Ginsberg (born 1979), Assistant Professor of Chemistry, University of California, Berkeley
- Samuel Ginsberg, best known as Walter Krivitsky (1899-1941), Soviet spy and defector
- William Ginsberg (1930–2006), American attorney, author, professor, environmentalist and former commissioner of parks and recreation in New York City

== Ginsburg ==
- Alan Ginsburg (born 1939), American real estate developer, businessman, and philanthropist
- Andrew Ginsburg (born 1979), American comedian, actor and former bodybuilder
- Anna Ginsburg, British film director
- Arnie Ginsburg (1926–2020), American disc jockey and businessman
- Art Ginsburg, best known as Mr. Food (1931-2012), American television chef
- Benson Ginsburg (1918–2016), American behavior geneticist
- Boris Naumovich Ginsburg (1933–1963), Soviet graphic artist and painter
- Chad I Ginsburg (born 1972), lead guitarist and mixer/producer of the modern rock band CKY
- Charles Ginsburg (1920–1992), leader of a research team that developed one of the first practical videotape recorders
- Charlotte Lucy Ginsburg, best known as Charlotte Gainsbourg (born 1971), English-French actress and singer-songwriter, daughter of Serge Gainsbourg
- Charles M. Ginsburg (born 1943), American pediatrician and clinical investigator
- Christian David Ginsburg (1831–1914), Polish-UK Hebrew language scholar
- David Ginsburg (disambiguation), multiple people, including:
  - David Ginsburg (chemist) (1920–1988), American-born Israeli chemist and research pioneer
  - David Ginsburg (lawyer) (1912–2010), American lawyer and political advisor
  - David Ginsburg (politician) (1921–1994), British politician and Member of Parliament
- Douglas H. Ginsburg (born 1946), Chief Judge of the United States Court of Appeals for the District of Columbia Circuit
- Emily Ginsburg, American conceptual artist
- Faye Ginsburg (born 1952), American anthropologist
- Helen Lachs Ginsburg (1929–2020), American economist
- Herbert Ginsburg (born 1939), American child development academic, author and professor
- Hymie Ginsburg (1914–1986), American professional basketball player
- Isaac Ginsburg (1886–1975), Lithuanian-born American ichthyologist
- James Steven Ginsburg (born 1965), American classical music producer
- Jane C. Ginsburg (born 1955), American attorney and the daughter of Ruth Bader Ginsburg
- Jason Ginsburg (born 1974), American author, producer and actor
- Jean Ginsburg (1926–2004), English physician and physiologist
- Jekuthiel Ginsburg (1889–1957), American mathematician and professor
- Joshua Ginsburg, American jazz bassist and composer
- Leon Ginsburg (1932–2014), Polish-American Holocaust survivor
- Madeleine Ginsburg (1928–2020), British dress historian
- Martin D. Ginsburg (1932–2010), American lawyer
- Mirra Ginsburg (1909–2000), Russian-born American translator and author
- Nadya Ginsburg, American actress, television writer and comedian
- Ophira Ginsburg, Canadian oncologist
- Renee Ginsburg Rabinowitz (1934–2024), Belgian-American-Israeli psychologist and lawyer.
- Ruth Bader Ginsburg (1933–2020), American jurist and United States Supreme Court justice
- Saul Moiseyevich Ginsburg (1866–1940), Russian author and historian
- Scott Ginsburg (1952–2024), American Businessman
- Serge Gainsbourg, né Lucien Ginsburg, (1928–1991) French singer, songwriter, pianist, film composer, poet, painter, screenwriter, writer, actor and director
- Seymour Ginsburg (1927–2004), computer science pioneer of automata, formal language, and database theories
- Shiphra Ginsburg, Canadian physician-scientist
- Spinoza Bernard Ginsburg, better known as Burne Hogarth (1911–1996), American artist, educator and cartoonist
- Tom Ginsburg (born 1967), American legal scholar and political scientist
- William H. Ginsburg (1943–2013), American lawyer who represented Monica Lewinsky during the Clinton-Lewinsky scandal
- Yehuda Leib Ginsburg (1888–1946), Russian-born American rabbi and talmudic scholar

== Ginzburg ==
Ginzburg is a Russo-German surname, usually steaming from South Russia and Georgia.

- Abraham Ginzburg (1926-2020), Israeli academic
- Abram Ginzburg (1878-1937), Russian revolutionary and economist
- Alexander Ginzburg, best known as Alexander Galich (1918–1977), Soviet poet, screenwriter, playwright, singer-songwriter and dissident
- Alexander Ginzburg (1936–2002), Russian journalist, poet, human rights activist and dissident
- Anton Ginzburg (born 1974), Soviet-born American artist and educator
- Boni Ginzburg (born 1964), Israeli footballer
- Carlo Ginzburg (1939–2026), historian and pioneer of microhistory, son of Natalia Ginzburg and Leone Ginzburg
- Carlos Ginzburg (born 1946), Argentinian artist and theoretician
- David Ginzburg, Israeli mathematician and professor
- Eitan Ginzburg (born 1977), Israeli politician and member of the Knesset
- Esti Ginzburg (born 1990), Israeli model
- Grigory Ginzburg (1904–1961), Jewish-born Russian pianist
- Irena Hausmanowa-Petrusewicz (née Ginzburg; 1917–2015), Polish doctor and neurologist
- Iser Ginzburg (1872–1947), Lithuanian-American physician and journalist
- Lazar Ginzburg, best known as Lazar Lagin (1903–1979), Soviet author
- Leo Ginzburg (1901–1979), Russian conductor and pianist of Polish origin
- Leon Ginzburg (1898–1988), American surgeon
- Leone Ginzburg (1909–1944), Russian-born Italian Jewish writer and anti-fascist
- Lev R. Ginzburg (born 1945), theoretical ecologist
- Lidiya Ginzburg (1902–1990), major Soviet literary critic and a survivor of the siege of Leningrad
- Lisa Ginzburg (born 1965), Italian author, translator, philosopher and daughter of Carlo Ginzburg
- Lisa Ginzburg (entrepreneur), Soviet-born American entrepreneur
- Moisei Ginzburg (1892–1946), Belarus-born Russian architect
- Natalia Ginzburg (née Levi; 1916—1991), Italian author
- Nora Ginzburg (born 1949), Argentine lawyer and politician
- Oren Ginzburg, French-Israeli writer and cartoonist
- Rahile Ginzburg (1920–1995), Soviet actress
- Ralph Ginzburg (1929–2006), American publisher of Eros Magazine
- Semyon Alexandrovich Ginzburg (1900–1943), Soviet armored vehicles designer
- Szela Ginzburg, birth name of Stefania Jabłońska (1920–2017), Polish physician, dermatologist and professor
- Victor Ginzburg (born 1957), Russian-born American mathematician
- Victor L. Ginzburg (born 1959), American director, producer and screenwriter
- Viktor Ginzburg (born 1962), Russian-American mathematician
- Vitaly Ginzburg (1916–2009), Russian physicist and laureate of the Nobel Prize of Physics
- Yevgenia Ginzburg (1904–1977), Russian historian and writer, mother of Vasily Aksyonov
- Zuzanna Polina Ginzburg, best known Zuzanna Ginczanka (1917–1944), Polish poet and satirist

== Other spellings ==
=== Gainsbourg ===
- Charlotte Gainsbourg (born 1971), English-French actress and singer-songwriter.
- Serge Gainsbourg (1928–1991), French singer-songwriter born Lucien Ginsburg.

=== Gensburg ===
- Robert Gensburg (1939–2017), American lawyer

=== Ghinsberg ===
- Yossi Ghinsberg (born 1959), Israeli adventurer, author and speaker

=== Gincburg ===
- Mira Oberholzer-Gincburg (née Mira Gincburg; 1884–1949), Russian-born Swiss medical doctor and a child psychology and psychoanalysis pioneer

=== Ginsborg ===
- Bernard Ginsborg (1925-2018), British pharmacologist and physiologist
- Hannah Ginsborg (born 1958), American academic, philosopher and professor
- Paul Ginsborg (1945–2022), British historian
- Ralf Ginsborg (1927–2006), Danish footballer

=== Ginsbourg ===
- Mark Ginsbourg, birth name of Mark Gayn (1902–1981), Russian-born American and Canadian left-wing journalist

=== Ginsburgh ===
- Stéphane Ginsburgh (born 1969), Belgian pianist
- Victor Ginsburgh (1939–2025), Belgian economist
- Yitzchak Ginsburgh (born 1944), American-born Israeli rabbi

=== Ginsparg ===
- Paul Ginsparg (born 1955), American theoretical physicist and creator of the ArXiv e-print archive

=== Gintsburg ===
- Aleksandr Gintsburg (1907–1972), Soviet cameraman and film director
- Alexander Gintsburg (born 1951), Soviet and Russian microbiologist

=== Ginzberg ===
- Abby Ginzberg (born c. 1950), American film director and producer
- Adele Ginzberg (née Katzenstein; 1886—1980), American Conservative Jewish leader,
- Eli Ginzberg (1911 - 2002) American academic, son of Adele and Louis Ginzberg
- Issamar Ginzberg (born 1980), Marketing consultant
- Rabbi Louis Ginzberg (1873–1953), one of the outstanding Talmud scholars of the twentieth century

=== Guinsburg, Guinzburg ===
- Jacob Guinsburg (1921-2018), Brazilian theatre critic
- Jorge Guinzburg (1949-2008), Argentine journalist and broadcaster
- Thomas Guinzburg (1926-2010), American editor and publisher

=== Gunsberg, Günsberg ===
- Arthur Günsburg (1872-1949), Austrian-born film director, producer and film company executive
- Isidor Gunsberg (1854–1930), Hungarian-born British challenger for the World Chess Championship
- Osher Günsberg (born 1974), British-Australian television presenter

=== Gunsburg, Günsburg ===
- Karl Siegfried Günsburg (1784–1860), German-Jewish writer and preacher

=== Gunsbourg ===
- Raoul Gunsbourg (1860–1955), Romanian-Jewish opera director, writer, composer and impresario

=== Günsburger, Gunzburger ===
- Elisabeth Günsburger, birth name of Lilly Flohr (1893–1978), Austrian silent film actress and singer
- Max Gunzburger (born 1945), Argentinian-born American mathematician
- Suzanne Gunzburger (1939–2026), American activist and elected official

== See also ==
- Ginsberg, township in the Eastern Cape, South Africa
- Günsberg, municipality in the district of Lebern, canton of Solothurn, Switzerland
- Ginzburg Skyscraper, former hotel in Kyiv which was Ukraine's first skyscraper and was the tallest building in Europe by roof height from 1912 to 1925.
- Full Ginsburg, a term in American politics
- Ginzburg-Landau theory, theory regarding superconductivity which resulted in Ginzburg and his colleagues becoming Nobel laureates in physics in 2003
- Bernard Ginsburg House, Historic house located in Detroit, Michigan and was registered to the National Register of Historic Places in 1991
