= David Günzburg =

Russian baron and orientalist (1857–1910)

- Давид Горациевич Гинцбург
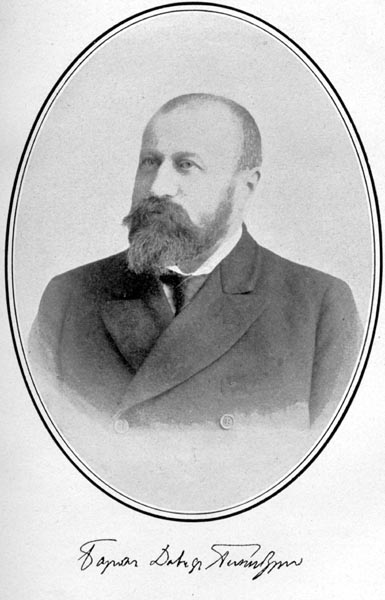
- Born: 5 July 1857; Kamianets-Podilskyi, Podolia, Russian Empire
- Died: 22 December 1910 (aged 53); St. Petersburg, Russian Empire

David Goratsiyevich Günzburg (Russian: Дави́д Гора́циевич Ги́нцбург; 5 July 1857 – 22 December 1910), 3rd Baron de Günzburg, was a Russian orientalist and Jewish communal leader.

== Biography ==
He was the son of Baron Horace Günzburg, who co-founded World ORT, a non-profit non-governmental organization whose mission is the advancement of Jewish and other people through vocational training and education, with past or present involvement in over 100 countries. His grandfather Joseph was ennobled in 1870 by the Grand Duchy of Hesse and made baron in 1874.

Günzburg was born in Kamianets-Podilskyi, in the Podolia Governorate of the Russian Empire (present-day Ukraine). He was educated at home, his teachers being Adolf Neubauer, Senior Sachs, and Hirsch Rabinovich. At the age of twenty he received the degree of "candidate" at St. Petersburg University, after having attended the lectures of Stanislas Guyard at Paris and Baron Rosen at St. Petersburg; later he studied Arabic poetry under Orientalist Wilhelm Ahlwardt (1828-1909) at Greifswald (1879–80).

He edited the Tarshish of Moses ibn Ezra in a fascicle which was issued by the Meqitze Nirdamim Society, and prepared for the press the Arabic translation of the same work, with a commentary. He published also Ibn Guzman (Berlin), and wrote a series of articles on "Metrics", published in the memoirs of the Oriental Department of the Russian Archeological Society (1893) and of the Neo-Philological Society (1892), in the "Journal" of the Ministry of Public Instruction of Russia, and elsewhere.

Günzburg was an enthusiastic patron of Jewish art, and published, with Vladimir Stasov, L'Ornement Hébreu (Berlin, 1903). In this book he gives examples of Jewish ornamentation from various manuscripts from Syria, Africa, and Yemen. He edited a catalogue of the manuscripts in the Institute for Oriental Languages. He also contributed largely to the Revue des Études Juives, to the Revue Critique, to Voskhod, to Ha-Yom, and to the collections of articles in honor of Zunz, Steinschneider, Baron Rosen, etc.

Günzburg's personal library was one of the largest private libraries in Europe, and contained many rare books and manuscripts. He was one of the trustees of the St. Petersburg community, a member of the "Committee for the Promotion of Culture Among the Jews of Russia", the central committee of the Jewish Colonization Association, the Society for Oriental Studies, the Scientific Committee of the Russian Department of Public Instruction, and a life-member of the Archeological Society of St. Petersburg and of the Société Asiatique of Paris.

In the film Nijinsky (1980), directed by Herbert Ross, Baron de Günzburg is played by Alan Badel. Günzburg's great-granddaughter is the American author Monique Raphel High.

Preceded by Joseph Günzburg; Horace Günzburg	Baron Günzburg; 2 March 1909–22 December 1910	Succeeded by Alexander Günzburg; Gabriel Jacob "Jacques" de Gunzburg; Nicolas de Gunzburg
