= David Ginsburg =

David Ginsburg may refer to:

- David Ginsburg (chemist) (1920–1988), Israeli researcher in synthetic organic chemistry
- David Ginsburg (lawyer) (1912–2010), American political advisor and lawyer
- David Ginsburg (politician) (1921–1994), British MP

== See also ==
- David Ginzburg, mathematician
