= Senior Sachs =

Russian-French Hebrew writer (1816–1892)

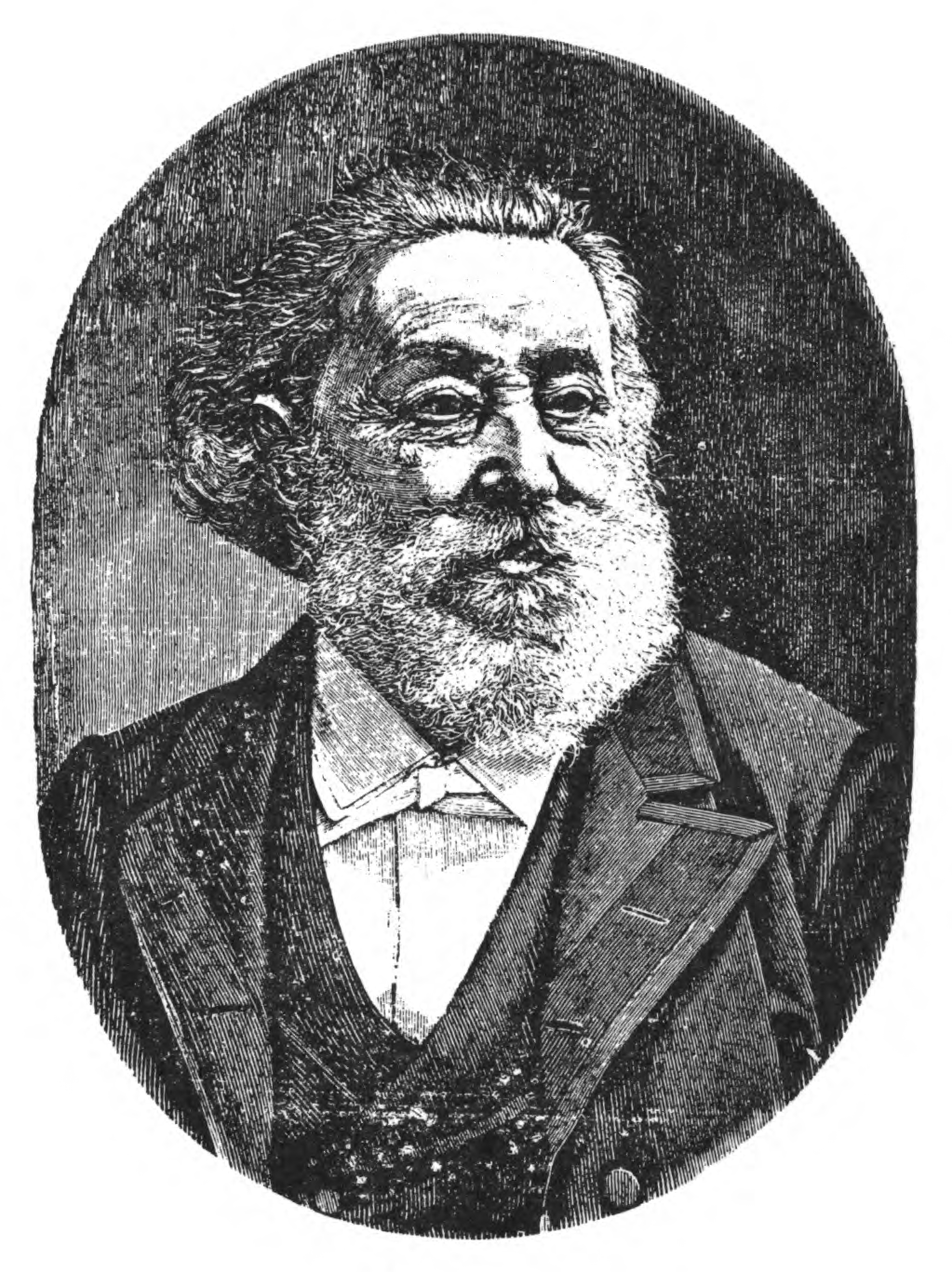
- Born: Shneur ben Tzemaḥ Zaks; 17 June 1816; Kaidany, Kovno Governorate, Russian Empire
- Died: 18 November 1892 (aged 76); Paris, France
- Writing career
- Language: Hebrew
- Literary movement: Haskalah

Signature
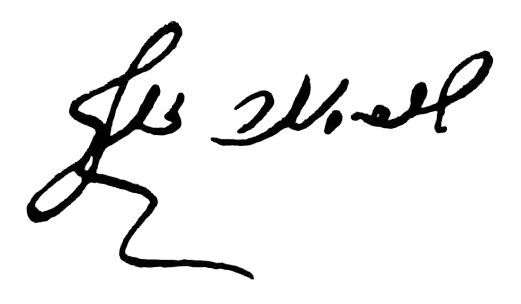

Senior Sachs (Hebrew: שניאור זק״ש, romanized: Shneur Zaks; 17 June 1816 – 18 November 1892), also known as the Or shani (אור שני), was a Russo-French Hebrew writer and scholar.

== Biography ==
=== Early life and education ===
Senior Sachs was born to a Jewish family in Kaidany, Kovno Governorate. He was raised in Zhagory, where his father, Tzemaḥ Sachs, was appointed rabbi when Senior was one and one-half years old. He studied Hebrew and Talmud under his father's tutelage, and while still a boy, manifested a predilection for Hebrew literature.

Sachs became acquainted with the parnas of the Kaidany community, who introduced him to Maskilic literature, including the works of Isaac Erter. Erter's writings so impressed him that he considered immediately moving to Brody in order to study under him, but Sachs' early marriage, in accordance with the custom of that time, prevented him. Instead, he studied for one year on a scholarship in the Wasilishok bet ha-midrash and taught for a year in Dubno. In around 1839 Sachs moved to Brody, where Erter assisted him in finding employment teaching Hebrew. Meanwhile, he studied German and Syriac, and devoted the greater part of his time to reading scientific and philosophical works.

=== Career ===
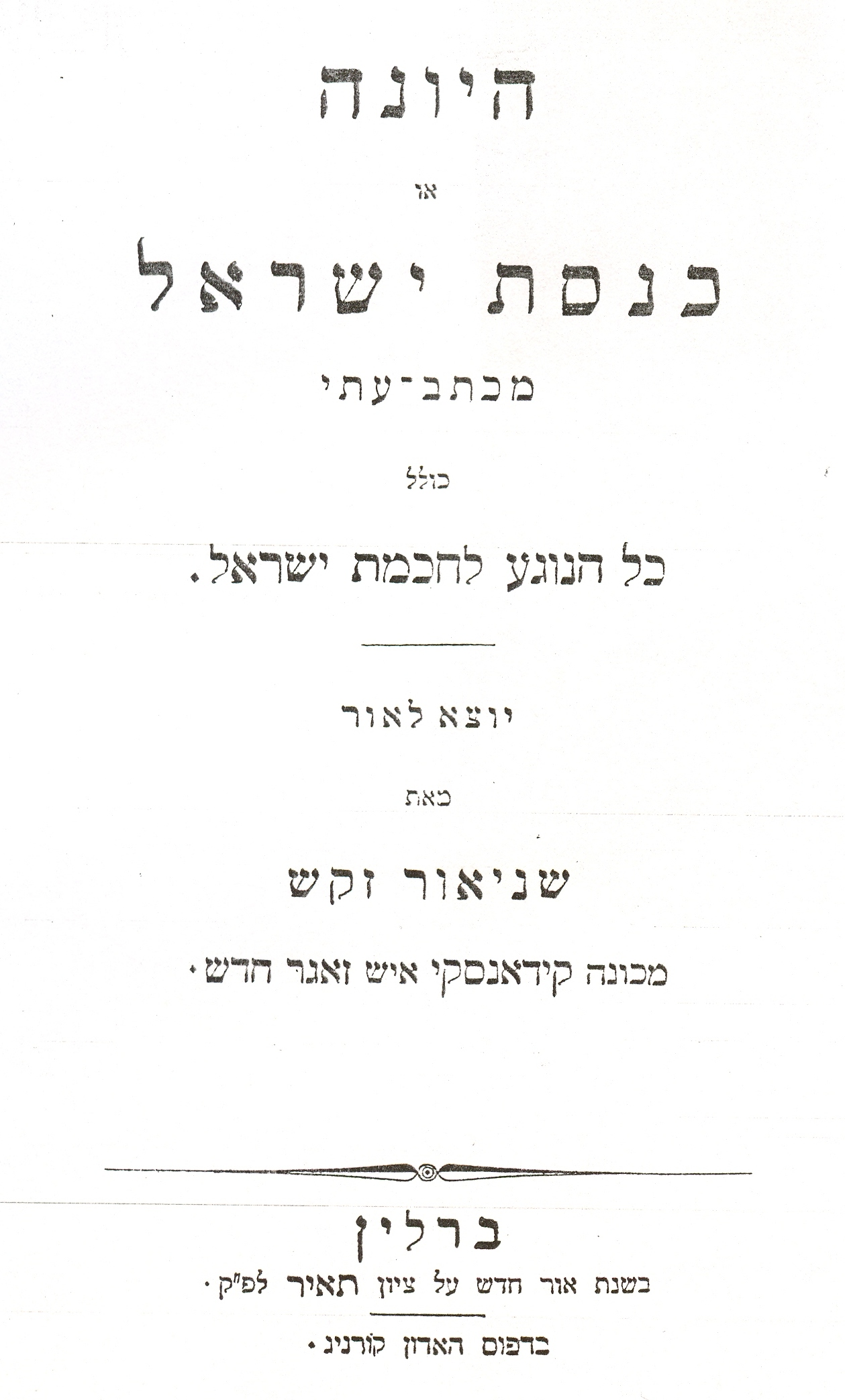
Title page of Ha-Yonah (1851).

Sachs remained two years in Brody, and while there wrote an article in Hebrew on Russo-Hebrew scholars and on the education of the Jews in Russia; this he sent to Isaak Markus Jost, who translated it into German, and published it anonymously in his Israelitische Annalen (1840, nos. 4–10). His parents having requested him to return home, Sachs set out on his journey, but, having no passport, was arrested on the Russian frontier. He was brought to Kremenets, where he was thrown into prison, remaining in confinement five months, when he was liberated through the efforts of Isaac Baer Levinsohn. Sachs stayed at Zhagory six months, when he was invited to teach at Rossiena, where he befriended novelist Abraham Mapu. He remained there until the end of 1843. At length he went to Berlin (1844), where he entered the university, attending particularly the lectures of Schelling and Althaus. In 1856 Sachs was invited to Paris by Baron Joseph Günzburg to become his private librarian and the tutor of his children.

In Paris Sachs displayed great activity in various branches of Hebrew literature, but as he occupied himself with different subjects at one and the same time, most of his works remained unfinished. While in Berlin he had begun to edit literary periodicals, the first of which was Ha-Teḥiyyah, treating chiefly of medieval religious philosophy. Only two numbers were issued, the first in 1850 and the second in 1857. In 1850 Sachs edited also Leopold Zunz's Ha-Palit, an index of valuable Hebrew manuscripts, with biographical notes on some of the authors. Of his Ha-Yonah only one number appeared (Berlin, 1851); it contains among other things an article by Hayyim Selig Slonimski on the Jewish calendar according to the ancient Talmudists. Sachs then undertook to continue the publication of the Kerem Ḥemed, editing the eighth and ninth volumes (Berlin, 1854 and 1856).

Sachs also researched and uncovered the wrongful attribution of twenty-one philosophical works of Solomon ibn Gabirol to the biblical King Solomon.

== Bibliography ==
- Ha-Teḥiyyah [The Renaissance]. Vol. 1. Berlin: Defus ha-adon Kornegg. 1850. hdl:2027/ien.35556036670032.
- Ha-Yonah [The Dove]. Berlin: Druck von Kornegg's Buchdruckerei. 1851. hdl:2027/osu.32435030695969.
- Ha-Teḥiyyah [The Renaissance]. Vol. 2. Berlin. 1857.
- Kanfe Yonah. Berlin. 1858. hdl:2027/njp.32101055768343. Supplement to Ha-Yonah.
- Le-yom huledet. À Mlle Mathilde Gunzbourg, à l'occasion de l'anniversaire de sa naissance (le 5 août 1859). Paris. 1859. Pamphlet on the anniversary of Mathilda Günzburg's birth.
- Kikayon Yonah. Paris. 1860. hdl:2027/njp.32101073623959. An announcement of the continuation of Ha-Yonah, containing, besides the prospectus, literary essays.
- Ben Yonah. Paris. 1860. A rimed prospectus of Ha-Yonah.
- Sefer taggin. Paris. 1866. A midrash, attributed to Rabbi Akiva, on the crowns of the letters, edited with an essay on the age of this work and also on the Sefer Shimmusha Rabba and Otiyot de-R. Akiva.
- Reshimah. Paris. 1866. A catalog (unfinished) of the Günzburg library.
- Shire ha-shirim asher li-Shelomoh. Paris: L. Guerin. 1868. hdl:2027/chi.29791773. The poems of Solomon ibn Gabirol revised, punctuated, and commentated by the editor.
- "Ḥidot R. Shelomoh ben Gabirol". Otzar Ha-Sifrut. 4: 90–111. hdl:2027/coo.31924106243862. Ibn Gabirol's riddles with solutions and explanations.
