= Conduit (mural) =

Mural in Portland, Oregon

- The steel mural in 2016

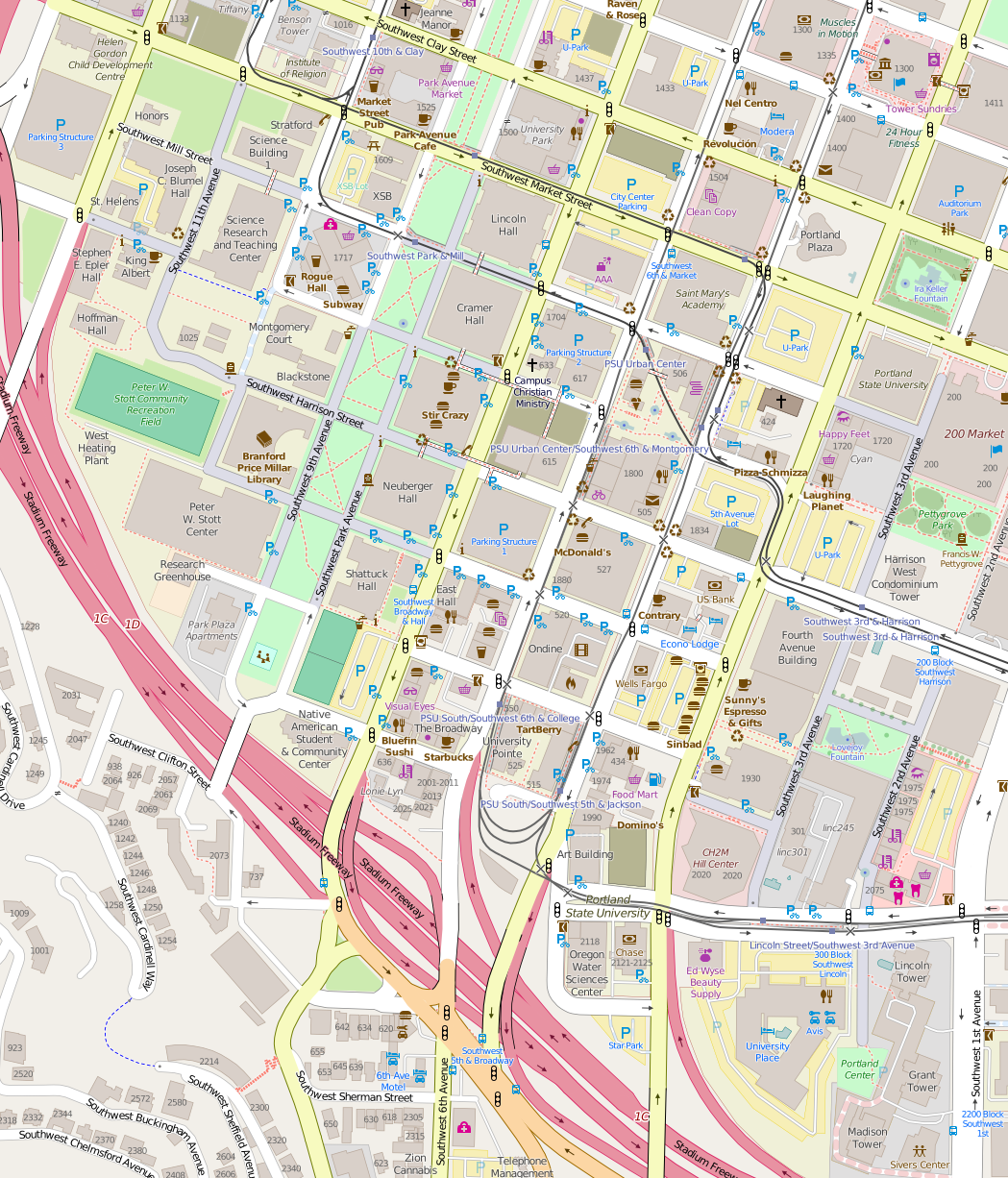
- Location on the Portland State University campus
- Artist: Emily Ginsburg
- Year: 2009–2010
- Type: Mural
- Medium: Metal (aluminum or steel)
- Dimensions: 2.3 m × 9.6 m (90 in × 377 in)
- Location: Portland, Oregon, United States; 45.51217°N 122.68252°W

Conduit is an outdoor 2009–2010 mural by Emily Ginsburg, installed on the University Services Building's exterior on the Portland State University campus in Portland, Oregon, in the United States.

== Description ==
Emily Ginsburg's Conduit is installed on the Southwest Sixth Avenue side of the University Services Building on the Portland State University campus. The Culture Trip describes the mural as "two forms, one illustrating thought and the other communication. Linking them is a road, along which the processes are tied. To outline these processes the work also includes visual maps of different aspects of life including work, home and learning, which are all connected to the act of travelling."

According to Ginsburg, the mural depicts "the act of traveling as a metaphor for the transmission and exchange of ideas and the perpetual space between thinking and communicating tied to learning, living and working". It is made of "black anodized, laser cut and etched" metal (aluminum, according to Ginsburg; steel, according to PSU), and measures 90 inches (2.3 m) × 377 inches (9.6 m).

== History ==
The site-specific work was commissioned by PSU and TriMet.

== See also ==
- 2009 in art
