= Benjamin Ginsberg =

Benjamin Ginsberg may refer to:

- Benjamin Ginsberg (businessman) (1886–1944), South African businessman, pioneer of commercialisation of rooibos.
- Benjamin Ginsberg (lawyer), American Republican lawyer and lobbyist
- Benjamin Ginsberg (political scientist), American libertarian political scientist
