= Monique Raphel High =

American novelist (1949-2017)

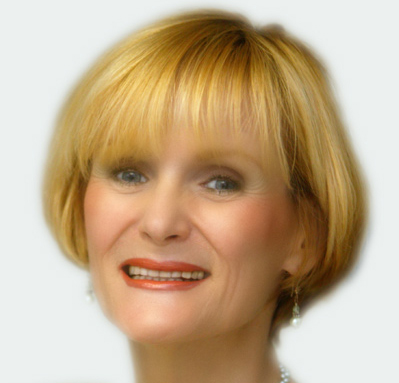
- Born: May 3, 1949
- Died: March 12, 2017 (aged 67)
- Spouse(s): Robert Duncan High (m. 1969; div. 1981) Grigorii Raiport (m. 1985; div. 1987) Ben Walter Pesta, II (m. 1987; died 2014)
- Father: David Raphel
- Relatives: Baron David de Günzburg (great grandfather)

Monique Raphel High was a Franco-American author. She was born in New York City on May 3, 1949, and died on March 12, 2017.

== Early life ==
High was the only daughter of French parents who had emigrated to the United States to escape the Nazi invasion in Europe. Her father, film executive David Raphel, is the grandson of Baron David de Günzburg. When she was only a few months old, her parents returned to Europe, where she was raised in Paris, Rome and Amsterdam.

While High was a teenager, her mother worked in the PR department of Columbia films and as an agent for the Alain Bernheim Literary Agency. She represented James Jones and Irwin Shaw.

As a child, High did research for Jules Dassin.

Monique’s father, film executive David Raphel, is the son of Baroness Sonia (Sofia Sara) de Gunzburg, and grandson of Baron David de Günzburg, whose family was ennobled by Tsar Alexander II and is considered among the most notable Jewish dynasties in the world. Baron David, for whom Monique’s father was named, was a renowned scholar, whose library ranked second among the private libraries in existence, with the King of England’s the only larger library of the day. This library, full of rare books and manuscripts dating back to the Middle Ages, was seized in 1917 by the Bolsheviks, and is now exhibited in Russia by the government of Vladimir Putin.

== Personal life ==
High married Robert Duncan High, her Yale sweetheart, an advertising executive, in 1969, the day of the Senior Prom. Their daughter, Nathalie Danielle Carroll, was born in Chicago in 1972. They were divorced in 1981.

She married Soviet psychiatrist/psychologist Grigorii Raiport in 1985. He was the sports psychologist for the U.S. Olympic Team, and defected in 1976. They co-wrote Red Gold. They divorced in 1987.

High married Los Angeles criminal defense attorney Ben Walter Pesta, II, in 1987. They were married until his death in July 2014.

High lived in Westwood, California and was working on her newest novel, a courtroom drama, when she died on March 12, 2017, after a period of illness.

== Career ==
High kept her first husband's name as her pen name. She published around a dozen books, mostly fictionalized historical dramas or romances. Some of them, such as Four Winds, based on her family history of the prominent de Gunzberg and Slatopolsky families, were best sellers.

A number of books from her back catalogue was re-issued by Penner Publishing in 2016 including Kindle versions.

== Selected works ==
- The Four Winds of Heaven (Granada London and Dell, 1980. Harper Collins, Beyruth, Trevise and Lasser, 1981. Sperling & Kupfer, Delacorte, 1989, and Linden Verlag )
- Encore (Dell, 1982)
- Natalia, Boris et Pierre (Trévise, 1982)
- The Eleventh Year (Harper Collins, Delacorte, 1983)
- Keeper of the Walls (Delacorte, 1985)
- Red Gold, with Grigorii Raiport (1986)
- Thy Father's House (Delacorte,1987)
- The Rock and the Flower (Corgi, 1988)
- Pariser Passion (Hestia Verlag, 1990)
- Between Two Worlds (Leisure Books, 1991)
- A Passo Di Danza (Mondadori)
- Irrevocable Trust (unfinished)
