= Lisa Ginzburg (entrepreneur) =

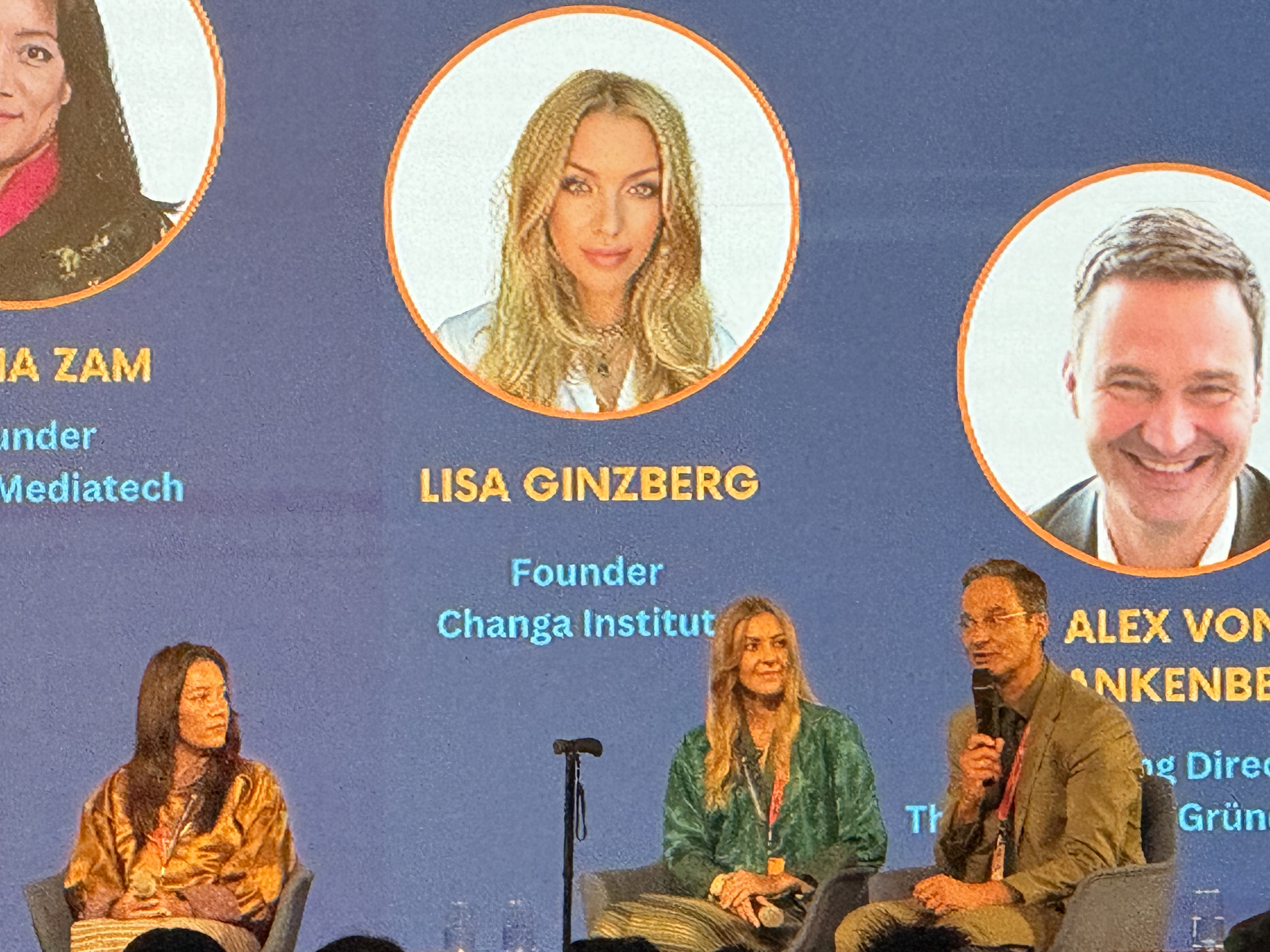
- Born: Vladivostok, Russia
- Citizenship: American
- Education: BA/BS degrees in Economics and Computer Science, Columbia University; MS in Architecture, Columbia University
- Known for: founder of Changa Institute

Lisa Ginzburg is a Russian-American entrepreneur. She is the founder and CEO of Changa Institute, US company which offer training in psychedelic-assisted therapy and wellness.

== Changa Institute ==
Changa Institute's first cohort graduated in March 2023, becoming the first licensed psilocybin facilitators in the United States outside of clinical trials in over 50 years. By 2024, graduates of the institute's program operated over 30% of Oregon's licensed psilocybin service centers and comprised nearly half of the state's licensed facilitators.

In July 2024, Changa Institute became the first state-licensed training program to offer psilocybin facilitator training in Colorado.
