= Emily Ginsburg =

American conceptual artist

Emily Ginsburg (born New York, New York) is a conceptual artist who lives in Portland, Oregon. She was selected for the Portland2016 Biennial by curator Michelle Grabner, and her work was noted as a highlight of the Oregon Biennial in 2006. Jennifer Gately, the curator of that Biennial, noted that Ginsburg's work, "reveals a deep interest in the signs and symbols of communication, scientific illustration, architectural notation, electronics, and the human nervous system." Ginsburg's "work often functions as a map or code for understanding an aspect of an individual or collective consciousness."

In 2010, Ginsburg completed Conduit, a public artwork installed on the University Services Building's exterior on the Portland State University campus in Portland, Oregon.Ginsburg's work has been included in books such as Data Flow: Visualizing Information in Graphic Design and The Map as Art, Contemporary Artists Explore Cartography. Ginsburg is a Professor and Chair of Media Arts, teaching in the Intermedia, Printmaking, MFA in Visual Studies, and MFA in Print Media programs at Pacific Northwest College of Art. She holds a Master of Fine Arts in Printmaking from Cranbrook Academy of Art in Bloomfield Hills, Michigan and a Bachelor of Arts in Art History from Trinity College in Hartford, Connecticut.

== Career ==
Ginsburg has been a professor at Pacific Northwest College of Art for 25 years.

== Notable solo exhibitions ==
- Mixed Feelings, Nine Gallery, Portland, Oregon, 2013
- Busy Signals, Washington State University Gallery, Pullman, Washington, 2009
- Habitual, Fairbanks Gallery, Oregon State University, Corvallis, Oregon, 2008
- Currents, Seattle Municipal Tower, Percent for Art Commission for Seattle City Light, Seattle, Washington (permanent installation)
- Social Studies, Nine Gallery, Portland, Oregon, 2005
- Slowness, The Art Gym, Marylhurst University, Marylhurst, Oregon, 2002
- Blotto, Manuel Izquierdo Gallery, Portland, Oregon, 2001
- Wavelength, Studio Art Centers International/Florence, Florence, Italy, 1999
- Or Current Resident, Metropolitan Center for Public Art, The Portland Building, Portland, Oregon, 1994
- Whirl, Centrum Gallery, Oregon College of Art and Craft, Portland, Oregon, 1993

== Notable group exhibitions ==
- Portland2016 Biennial, Disjecta, 2016
- Choreograph: Emily Ginsburg and Jane Lackey, The Art Gym, Marylhurst, 2010
- Oregon Biennial, Portland Art Museum, 2006

== Notable collections ==
- Franklin Furnace Archive at the Museum of Modern Art, New York New York
- Museo da Gravura de Curitiba, Curitiba, Brazil
- University of Wisconsin, Madison, Wisconsin
- Rhode Island School of Design, Providence Rhode Island
- Gilkey Center for Graphic Arts, Portland Art Museum, Portland, Oregon
- Printmaking Workshop, New York, New York
- Library of Congress, Washington, D.C.
- Archer M. Huntington Gallery, University of Texas at Austin, Austin, Texas
- Cranbrook Academy of Art Museum, Bloomfield Hills, Michigan
- Print Club of Albany, Albany, New York
- California State University at Long Beach, Long Beach, California
- Colgate University Art Museum, Hamilton, New York
- National Academy of Fine Arts, Hang Zhou, China
- City of Portland, Portable Works Collection, Portland, Oregon
- City of Seattle, Seattle Municipal Tower, Seattle, Washington
