= Nicolas de Gunzburg =

French-American editor (1904–1981)

- Gunzburg c. 1928
- Born: 12 December 1904; Paris, France
- Died: 20 February 1981 (aged 76); New York City, U.S.
- Other name: Julian West
- Occupations: Banker, fashion editor, actor

Nicolas Louis Alexandre de Gunzburg (French pronunciation: [ni.kɔ.lɑ lwi a.lɛɡ.zɑ̃.dʁə d(ə) ɡœ̃z.byʁ]; 12 December 1904 – 20 February 1981), also known as Baron Nicolas de Gunzburg, was a French-born magazine editor and socialite. He became an editor at several American publications, including Town & Country, Vogue, and Harper's Bazaar. He was named to the International Best Dressed List Hall of Fame in 1971.

== Background and family ==
Baron Nicolas "Niki" de Gunzburg was born in Paris, France, a scion of a wealthy and influential Russian-Jewish family, whose fortune had been made in banking and oil. The Günzburgs, as they were originally known, were ennobled during the 1870s by Louis III, Grand Duke of Hesse and by Rhine. When family members began spending a great deal of time in France later in the century, the umlaut was dropped and the particle "de" adopted. Their Hessian title was made hereditary in 1874 by Czar Alexander II of Russia.

His father was Baron Gabriel Jacob "Jacques" de Gunzburg (1853–1929), a nephew of the Russian philanthropist Baron Horace Günzburg. His Brazilian-born mother, Enriqueta "Quêta" de Laska (died 1925), was of Polish and Portuguese descent, a daughter of Doña Joaquina Maria Marqués de Lonza Lisboa; she had been previously married to French collector and bibliophile Germain Bapst (1853–1921) and married thirdly, after her divorce from Jacques de Gunzburg, Prince Basil Narischkine.

Raised primarily in England, where his father worked for the bankers Hirsch & Co. and served as a director of the Ritz Hotels Development Corporation, Gunzburg spent his later youth in France. Living the life of a bon vivant in the Paris of the 1920s and 1930s, Gunzburg spent money lavishly, and his costume balls featured extravagant sets designed by architects and artists.

Gunzburg had an elder half-sister:

- Audrey Manuelle Alexandre Joaquina Bapst(1892–1940), a painter and set-and-costume designer, who was a muse to French writer Paul Claudel. She married, firstly, British diplomat Raymond Cecil Parr, and, secondly, Norman Robert Colville, before being killed in a road accident near her home in Cornwall, England. She had two sons: stockbroker Capt. Anthony James Parr (1914–1996) and naval architect Martin Rennel Charlton Parr (born 11 February 1928 died 23 April 2016), who were her brother's sole heirs. Married Mary-Thérèse née Prideaux-Brune. Two Daughters Henrietta Mary Audrey 1980 and Anna Cecilia Mary Diana 1981.

One of Gunzburg's relatives, Baron Dimitri de Gunzburg, was a patron of Russian dance impresario Sergei Diaghilev of the Ballets Russes and portrayed by actor Alan Badel in the 1980 Paramount film Nijinsky in which Alan Bates played Sergei Diaghilev. His cousin Baron Pierre de Gunzburg's daughter, Aline, married, as her third husband, the British writer and philosopher Isaiah Berlin.

== Star of Vampyr (1932) ==
Carl Theodor Dreyer, the Danish film director, met Gunzburg in Paris. This led to their co-production of the expressionistic horror film Vampyr (1932). Loosely based on the vampire stories by Joseph Sheridan Le Fanu collected as In a Glass Darkly, the protagonist, Allan Gray, was played by Gunzburg under the screen name Julian West.

As Dreyer scholars Jean and Dale D. Drum have observed: "The baron was by no means a talented player, but Dreyer directed him to move through the scenes as though he were in a dream, with very little expression on his face and with all motion slowed down and muffled; in this way he fitted into the mood of the film quite successfully".

== Emigration to the United States ==
Legend states that upon the death of his father, Gunzburg learned the remaining family fortune was non-existent. Left with only the money he had in a checking account, he purchased his passage to America and used what was left to throw a costume ball in July 1934. Co-hosted by Gunzburg and Prince and Princess Jean-Louis de Faucigny-Lucinge, "Le Bal de Valses", aka "A Night at Schoenbrunn", had as its theme the Imperial Court at Vienna in 1860. Gunzburg appeared as Archduke Rudolf, Denise Bourdet as Marie Vetsera, Prince de Faucigny-Lucinge as Emperor Franz Josef, his wife Baba de Faucigny-Lucinge as Empress Elizabeth, and Carlos de Beistegui as Ludwig of Bavaria.

Arriving in America in 1934 together with Fulco di Verdura and Princess Natalie Paley, Gunzburg settled first in California. He was one of many European émigrés who sought refuge in the growing colony of artists in Hollywood. Gunzburg soon abandoned California for Manhattan, which was his home for the remainder of his life.

Gunzburg arrived in New York City on 10 November 1936 and rented an apartment in the Ritz Tower. His certificate of Immigration from the French Consulate General in New York listed him as "sans profession". However, in a Canadian border-crossing document filed earlier that year, he stated that he had been in New York City from April through September 1936, gave his profession as "banker", his French address as 15 Place Vendôme in Paris, and his reference a cousin Baron Pierre de Gunzburg (54 Avenue d'Iéna, Paris).

== Publishing career ==
After working as an editor at Harper's Bazaar and as editor in chief of Town & Country, Gunzburg was appointed senior fashion editor of Vogue in 1949. Chauvinistically, he admitted that office life had its drawbacks. "I want to be in fashion, so I have to work with women, and that's that," he told The New York Times in 1969. "But what it all comes down to is the weekly paycheck, isn't it?" Alexander Liberman, the editorial director of Condé Nast Publications, called Gunzburg "One of the most civilized men in Paris."

Known for his minimalist wardrobe of black, grey, and white—his black suits were made by Knize & Co., the Viennese tailors— Gunzburg was named to Vanity Fair's International Best Dressed Hall of Fame in 1971.

One Vogue writer described him as:

A slender, attractive man with a really dry wit, a gift for mimicry, and a sharply developed taste for the simple but cultivated amenities of living.

Gunzburg also was a mentor to three up-and-coming fashion designers who would go on to dominate the industry: Bill Blass, Oscar de la Renta, and Calvin Klein. The last-named, whom Gunzburg met in the mid-1960s, was perhaps the baron's most famous protégé, and Klein discussed Gunzburg with Bianca Jagger and Andy Warhol in Interview magazine, published not long after the baron's death:

He was truly the greatest inspiration of my life ... he was my mentor, I was his protégé – If you talk about a person with style and true elegance – maybe I'm being a snob, but I'll tell you, there was no one like him. I used to think, boy, did he put me through hell sometimes, but boy, was I lucky. I was so lucky to have known him so well for so long.

Recalling one of Calvin Klein's first major fashion shows, Gunzburg said that immediately after the show a nervous Klein sought out his opinions on his new designs, and on whether the event had been a success or failure. The response to his protégé, a wry assessment – chilly, but supportive and polite: "You showed great courage".

== Personal life ==
Gunzburg, who was homosexual and never married, had two known long-term companions:

- Erik Rhodes, an actor
- Paul Sherman (died 1985), an artist

== Residence ==
Gunzburg was a summer resident of Highland Lakes, in Vernon Township, New Jersey for the last 20 years of his life. In December 1959, he purchased a two-acre island he called Hemlock, and constructed a causeway and summer house, which he decorated and furnished in a Tyrolean style.

== Death ==
Gunzburg died at New York Hospital at age 76. He was buried the following spring near his summer home in Glenwood Cemetery, with a small private service at which Blass, de la Renta, and Klein were among the mourners.

Preceded by Joseph Günzburg; Horace Günzburg; David Günzburg; Alexander Günzburg; Gabriel Jacob "Jacques" de Gunzburg	Baron de Gunzburg; 1929 – 20 February 1981	Extinct
