= Herbert Ginsburg =

American academic

Herbert P. Ginsburg is Jacob H. Schiff Foundation Emeritus Professor of Psychology & Education at Teachers College, Columbia University.

He is a leading interpreter of children's understanding of mathematics, with research and teaching interests in intellectual development, mathematics education, and testing and assessment. He is a co-author of the Big Math for Little Kids curriculum for prekindergarten and kindergarten.

He received a Ph.D. and an M.S. in Developmental Psychology from the University of North Carolina, and a B.A. from Harvard University.
