= Horace Günzburg =

Russian philanthropist (1833–1909)

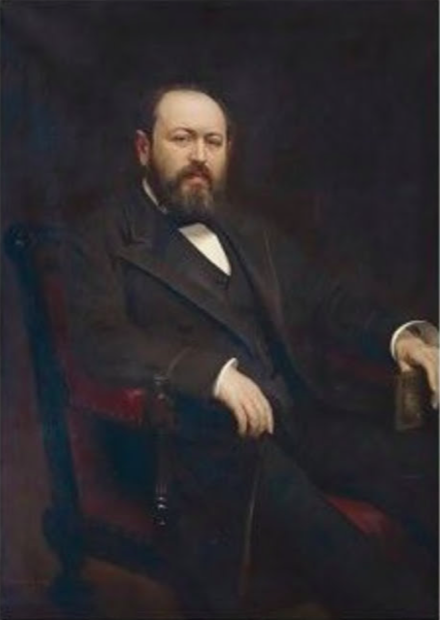
Portrait, 19th century

Horace Osipovich (Naftali-Gerts) Günzburg (Russian: Гораций Евзелевич Гинцбург, romanized: Goratsy Yevzelevich Gintsburg; 8 February 1833 – 2 March 1909), 2nd Baron Günzburg, was a Russian banker and philanthropist of Jewish descent.

== Rise to prominence ==
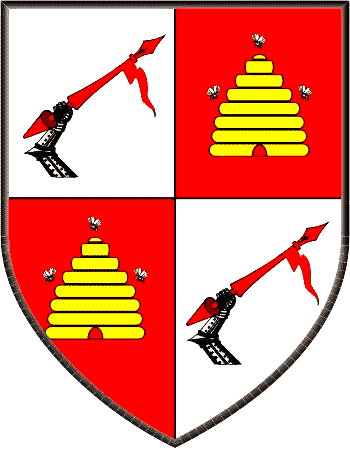
Coat of arms of the Günzburg family

He was born in Zvenigorodka. Günzburg received his education at home in Zvenigorodka. After the Crimean War, his father, Joseph Günzburg, then a wealthy merchant and army contractor, settled with his family in St. Petersburg. Günzburg first came before the public in 1863 as one of the founders of the Society for the Spread of Enlightenment among the Jews of Russia, the only society of the kind in Russia. He was one of the charter members of the society, and after the death of his father in 1878 succeeded him in the presidency. He was the largest contributor to its support and one of its most energetic workers. The work which made him so widely popular among the Jews was his unremitting effort, in which frequent appeals to the Russian government were involved, toward the improvement of the legal status of his coreligionists, and for the securing by legislation, as well as by other means, of their economic and moral welfare.

In 1870, he was summoned as an expert before the commission on the "Jewish Question," which met under the auspices of the Ministry of the Interior. In 1883, he corresponded with Gerson von Bleichroeder, the financial consultant of Otto von Bismarck, the German Chancellor, on the problem of rising antisemitism in Russia.

== Positions ==
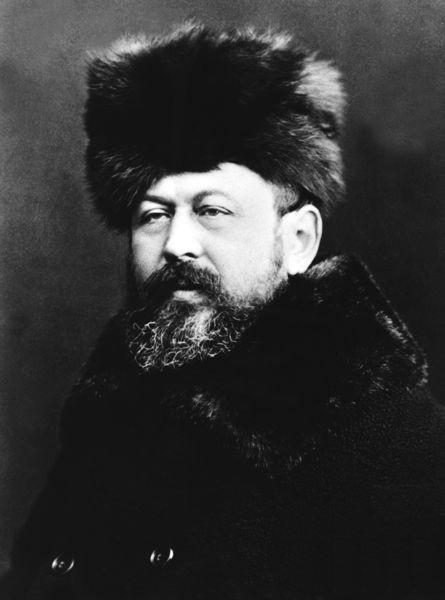
Gunzburg wearing ushanka hat.

Baron Horace Günzburg

He was chairman of the Jewish congress which, by permission of the government, assembled in St. Petersburg in 1882. In 1887 he was invited to participate in the discussions of the high commission on the Jewish question, under the presidency of Count von der Pahlen. In 1880 he became a member of the board of governors of the temporary commission for the organization of a society for the purpose of encouraging Russian Jews to engage in agriculture and trades. He employed the lawyer, Emmanuel Levin, an auto-didact working within the system zakonmost of reformed juridical institutions. The rise of the "diploma intelligentsia" was critical to the challenges that Jews were able to make.

From 1893 he was chairman of the central committee of the Jewish Agricultural Society. One of the colonies in Argentina is named in honor of Baron Günzburg. In 1890 he was elected president of the Hygienic and Low-House-Rent Society of St. Petersburg. In 1901 he became president of the board of directors of the Jewish Agricultural Farms in Minsk, and director of the Jewish Agricultural School in Novo-Poltavka.

The Jewish community of St. Petersburg was also under obligation to Baron Günzburg for its synagogue, of which he was president. He was also the head of a new, non-sectarian school erected in honour of the wedding of Tsar Nicholas II.

In 1880, together with Samuel Polyakov and Nikolai Bakst, Baron Gunzburg petitioned Tsar Alexander II for permission to start an assistance fund which would provide vocational education and training in practical occupations like handicrafts and agriculture for thousands of Russian Jews then living in poverty in the Pale of Settlement and would help them to help themselves. The initiative would eventually evolve into the World ORT educational network.

Horace Günzburg is also closely identified with other institutions of a non-sectarian character. He was an honorary member of the committee of the Prince Oldenburg Infant Asylum from 1863, and honorary member of the Society for Improving the Condition of Poor Children of St. Petersburg since 1876. Between 1868 and 1872 he was consul-general of Hesse-Darmstadt. In 1871 the title "Baron" was bestowed upon him by the Grand Duke of Hesse-Darmstadt, permission being given by the Tsar to accept that title of nobility.

In 1880, 1884, and 1888 he received successively the titles of "counsel of commerce," "secretary of state," and "member of the council of commerce of the Treasury Department." For many years he was an alderman of St. Petersburg, but, upon the passage of a statute prohibiting the election of Jewish aldermen, vacated that office. Baron Günzburg was repeatedly elected trustee of the charitable affairs of the Stock Exchange of St. Petersburg and member of the council of the Stock Exchange Hospital. He contributed heavily to the erection of the latter institution. In 1898 he was elected member of the committee of the Society for the Dissemination of Commercial Knowledge, and in the same year became chairman of the house committee of the Women's Sewing-School of the Tsarina Maria Alexandrovna. In 1899 he was made trustee of the School of Commerce of Tsar Nicholas II. In 1900 he was chosen a member of the committee of the Russian Society for the Protection of Women. He was a member of the board of the Treasury Department of the Stock Exchange, and a member of the executive board of the St. Petersburg Archeological Institute. Even at his advanced age he was often invited by the government to sit on commissions for the revision of general legislation. In 1895 and 1900-01 he was associated with such imperial commissions for the amendment of the laws governing the Stock Exchange, stock companies, corporations, and mining companies.

The seventieth birthday of Baron Günzburg, which was also the fortieth anniversary of his entry into public affairs, was celebrated all over Europe and the United States. On this occasion the Russian government conferred on the baron the medal of St. Anne (1st class). In New York a Baron de Günzburg Fund was started, the interest of which was given periodically as a premium for the best work on Jewish history and literature.

He was the father of David Günzburg.

== Sources ==
| Preceded by Joseph Günzburg | Baron Günzburg; 12 January 1878-2 March 1909 | Succeeded by David Günzburg; Alexander Günzburg; Gabriel Jacob "Jacques" de Gunzburg; Nicolas de Gunzburg |
