= Andrew Ginsburg =

American comedian and actor (born 1979)

- Born: October 7, 1979 (age 46); New York City, US

Andrew Ginsburg (born October 7, 1979) is an American comedian and actor who has appeared on The Sopranos and All My Children. He is also a three-time champion bodybuilder.

== Early life ==
Andrew Ginsburg was born on October 7, 1979, in New York, New York. Andrew attended Lawrence High School where he excelled at tennis. He later attended Boston University and it was there that he earned a degree in Psychology while also becoming a member of the men's tennis team.

== Career ==
Andrew Ginsburg is a stand-up comedian, actor, author, and fitness expert who has performed in comedy clubs and colleges across the country.

His TV appearances include “The View,” “Saturday Night Live,” “The Sopranos,“ “All My Children,” “As The World Turns,” “The Guiding Light” and “One Life to Live.” You have also heard Andrew on Sirius/XM's “Laugh Attack,” iHeart Radio's "24/7 Comedy," “Hey, Get Off My Lawn,” and Martha Stewart Living Radio.

Ginsburg's 4th comedy album "Eat the Yolk," was recorded live at Caroline's on Broadway. The album debuted in the Top 10 on the iTunes Comedy Chart.

His work has been published in The New York Times, New York York Post, Huffington Post, Details Magazine, Muscle and Fitness Magazine, Elle, and Glamour Magazine.

On April 18, 2017, his first book Pumping Irony: How to Build Muscle, Lose Weight, and Have the Last Laugh will be released by Skyhorse Publishing.
