= Boris Naumovich Ginsburg =

Soviet painter (1933–1963)

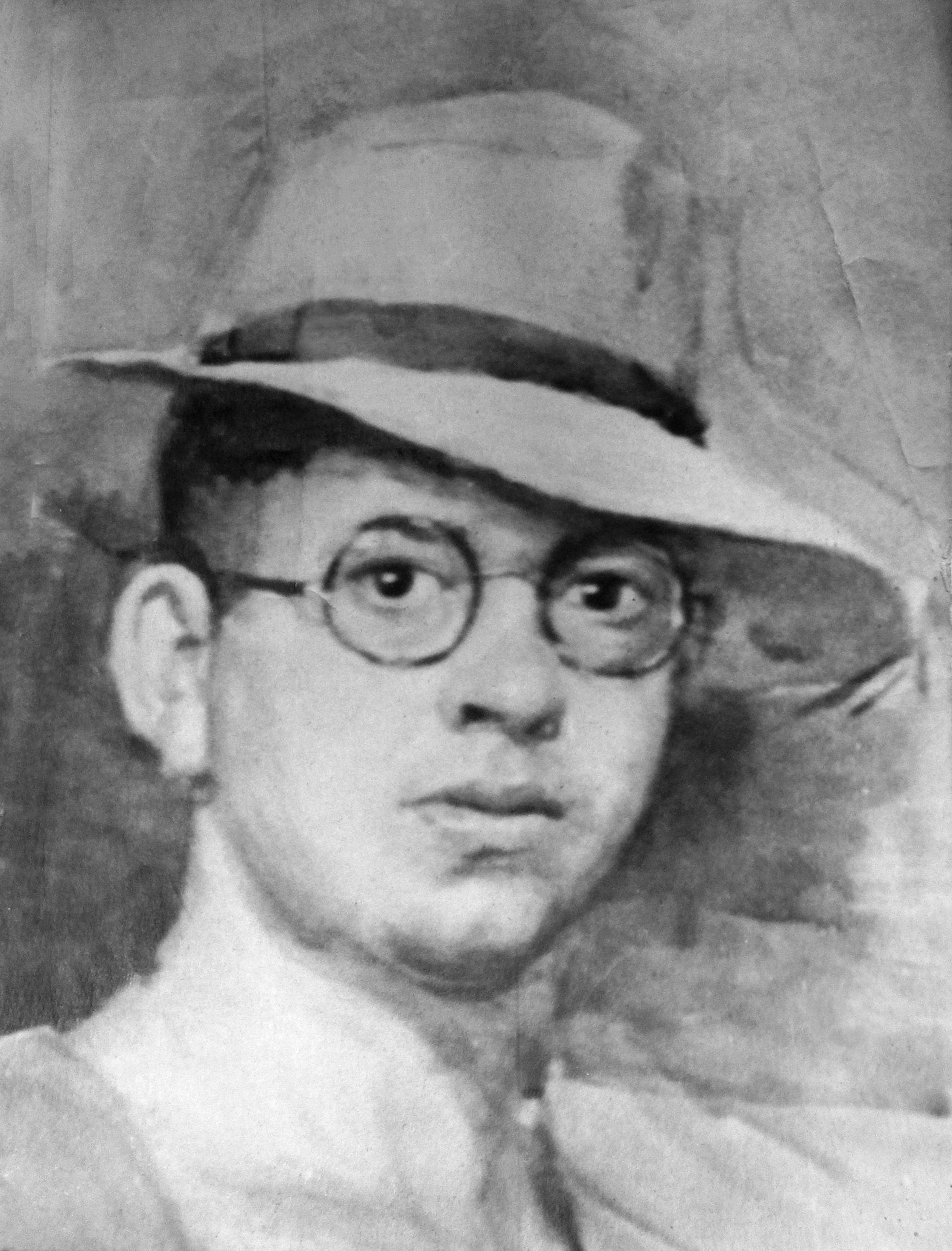
- Born: June 21, 1933
- Died: October 23, 1963 (aged 30)
- Education: Kyiv Art Institute

Boris Naumovich Ginsburg (June 21, 1933, Kryvyi Rih — October 23, 1963, Kyiv, Ukrainian SSR) was a Soviet painter and graphic artist.

== Biography ==
Boris Naumovich Ginsburg was born on June 21, 1933, in the city of Kryvyi Rih. He spent his youth and his brief life in Kyiv. From 1941 to 1944, together with his mother and younger sister, he was evacuated to Krasnodar and later to Turkmenistan. In 1947 the family joined their father in Magadan, where Boris spent his childhood years. His talent for drawing, discovered in early childhood, brought the young man to T.G. Shevchenko Kyiv Republican Art School. Having graduated, he entered the Graphic department of the Kyiv Art Institute (1952–1958). He was able to have V. Kasiyan and I. Pleschinsky as his tutors, and A. Paschenko, a famous Ukrainian graphic artist and a talented teacher, as his thesis supervisor.

Ginsburg graduated from the Art Institute with the honours degree and in the same year the twenty-five-year-old became the member of the Union of Artists of Ukraine. While still a student, his works were exhibited at Ukraine and USSR wide exhibitions. They attracted the attention of laymen and specialists alike with their perfection of form, profound meaning and accomplished craftsmanship. During his brief life the artist managed to create, monumental in their stature and execution, a series of lithographs dedicated to creative labour: "About People of Work" (1957–1958), "The New Ukrainian Semiletka Buildings" (1959–1960), "People of the Semiletka" (1960–1961) Like the majority of Ukrainian artists of the time, he engaged with the literary classics, creating a series of works dedicated to T. Shevchenko (1961–1962), illustrations to the great poet's works and to L. Ukrainka's poetry. Despite these considerable achievements for a budding artist, in 1960-1962 he continued to study at the creative workshops of the Academy of Arts of the USSR in Kyiv, under the patronage of the National Artist of the USSR Michail Deregus.

== Work ==
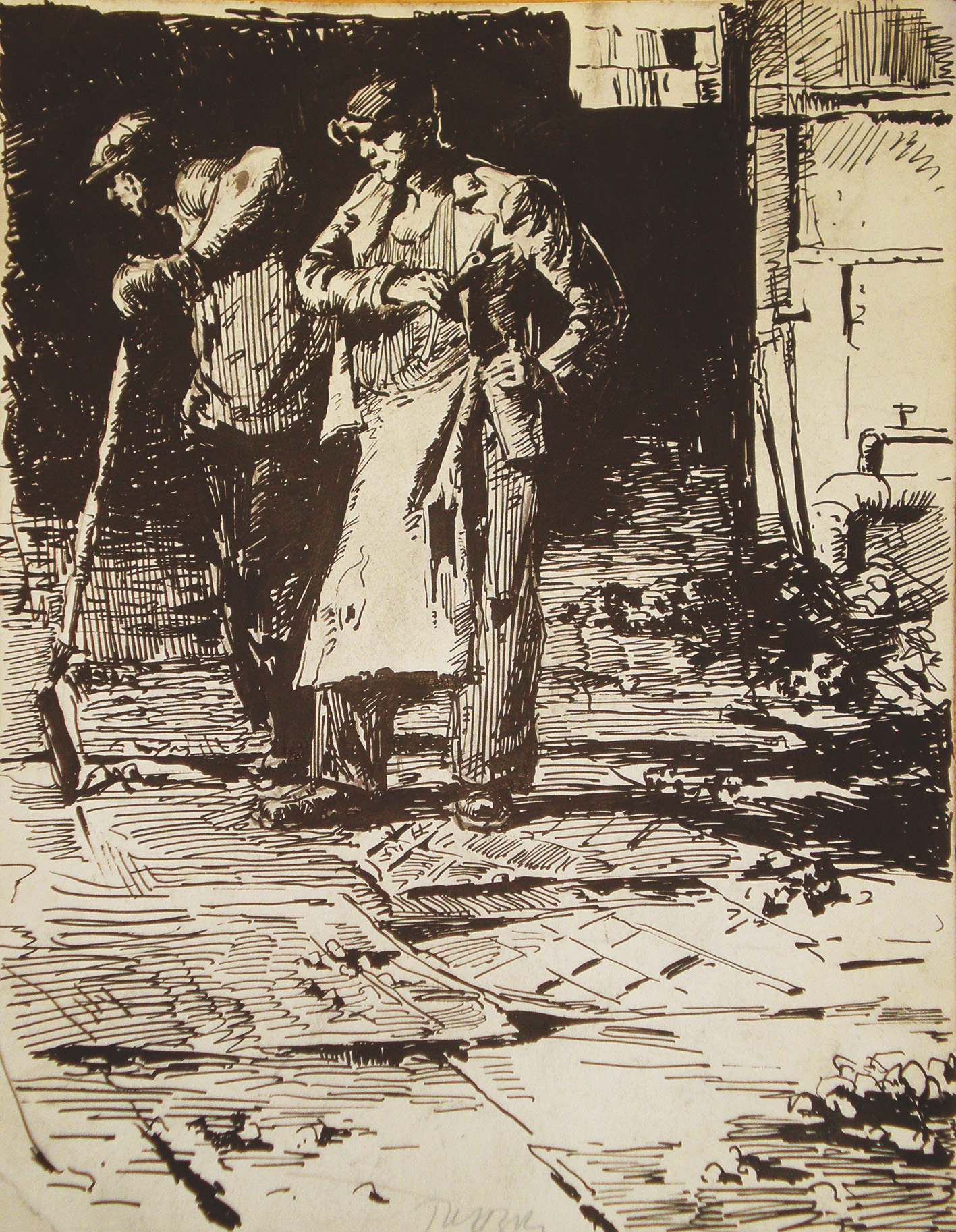
Steelmakers, 1957

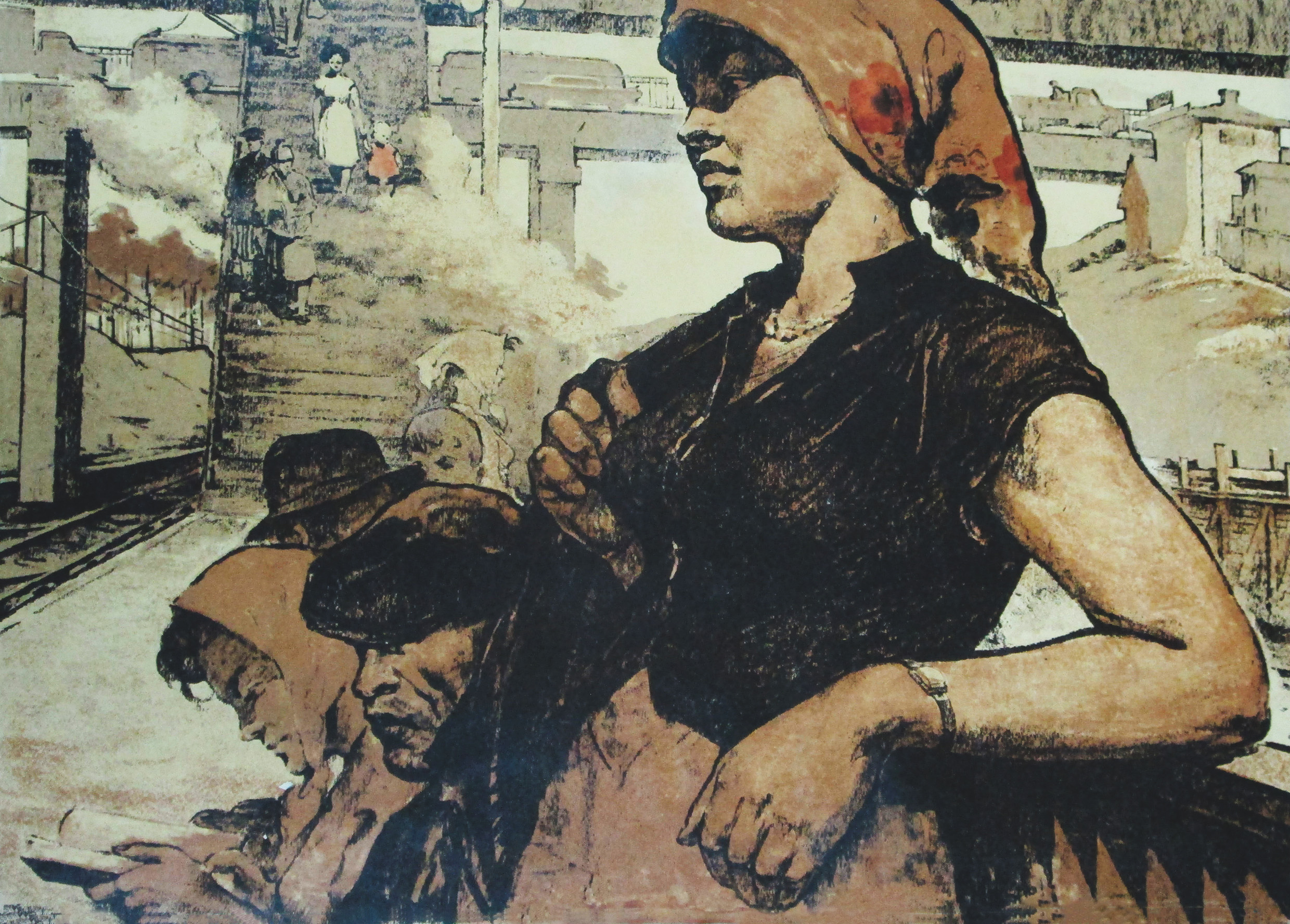
Waiting for a Suburban Electric Train, 1960

The series About People of Work (1958) marked an early stage of Ginsburg's artistic career. According to the cited source, the series demonstrated his academic training and focused on depictions of industrial workers. For the six completed lithographs, the artist produced numerous preparatory sketches exploring different compositions and interpretations. The series also included portraits of steelworkers created in charcoal.

The New Ukrainian Semiletka Buildings (1959–1960) is also a lithographic series, created on a commission by the Union of Artists, in which, alongside the key moments of Kremenchug Hydro Electric Station construction, a lot of attention is paid to the rank and file participants of the grandiose building project. In this series the artist emphasizes images of women, as if juxtaposing the beauty and fragility of the female figures with the surrounding construction giants. The artist also remained true to the humanistic concept of art in the third lithographic series The People of Semiletka (1960–1961). Reminiscence of the Black Sea became the most vivid and the most unconventional of the series. Through the prism of his depicting the fishermen's work one could clearly observe the unmistakable romantic notes of the European art tradition.

Ginsburg also worked extensively in watercolour, producing landscapes depicting the sea, piers, ships, and the Crimean region, including Koktebel. These works formed an important part of his artistic output.

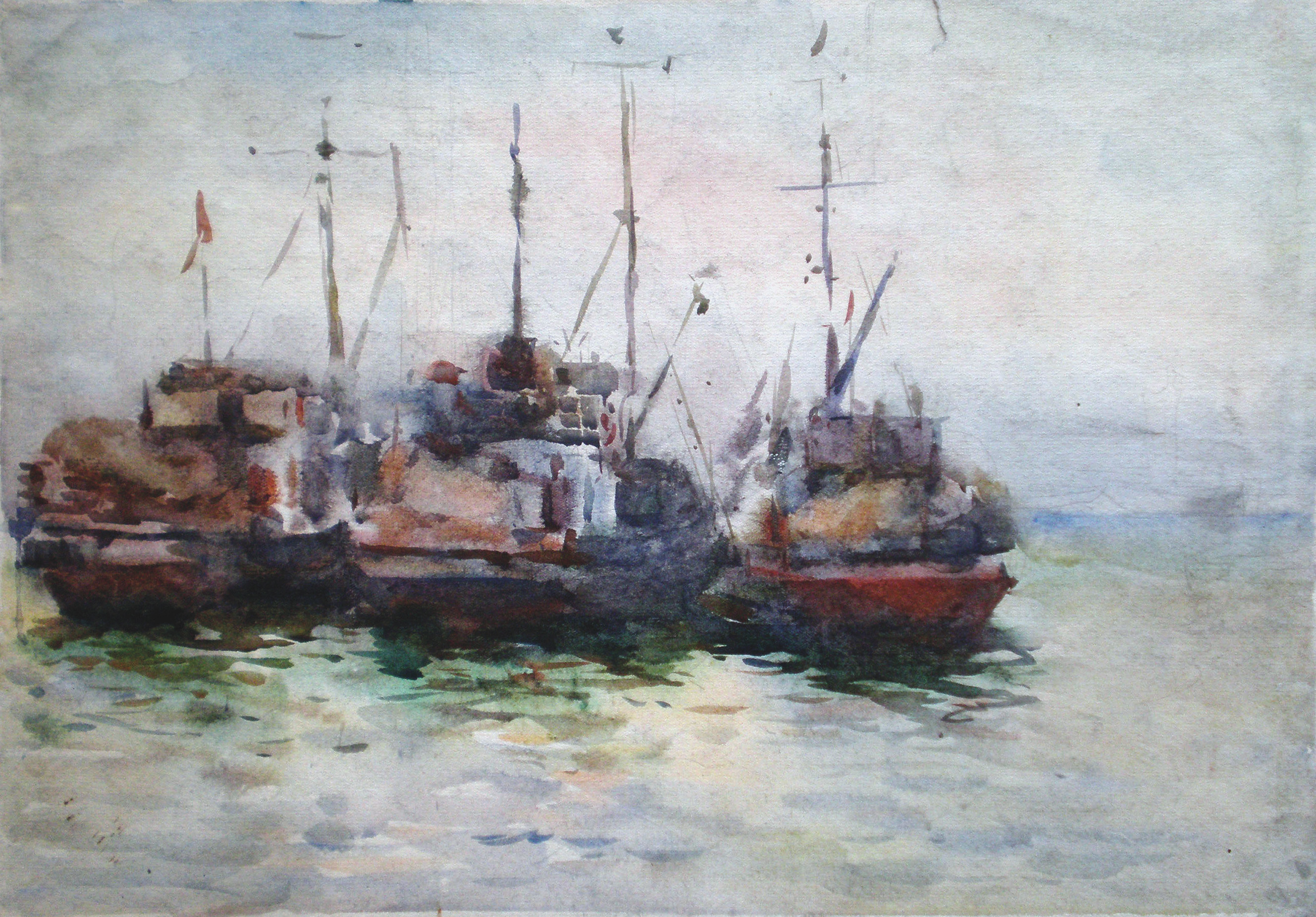
The Three Ships, 1962

Although for the artist the sea was not only primordial beauty imbued with inimitable harmony, but also a dwelling place of the manmade objects- the ships. In depiction of the latter he predominantly employs graphic techniques: coal sketching, graphite pencil, drypoint print, etching and linocut print. He is unsurpassed as regards compositional variations in depicting ships or fishermen's life. Every sheet is representative of the original nonrecurring compositional scheme, the most corresponding to realizing each concrete artistic idea.

The lyrical nature of the artist's character is defined his perspective on the interpretation of the Soviet woman-worker image. Remaining confined to the unavoidable industrial themes of the official commissions, he first and for most emphasizes the femininity in his fish factory workers, helmswomen, attendants and electricians. Even the drab shapelessness of their working uniforms does nothing to conceal it. Every work reveals to the viewer a "soviet Madonna"; slightly mysterious with her hint of a smile and averted daydreaming gaze.

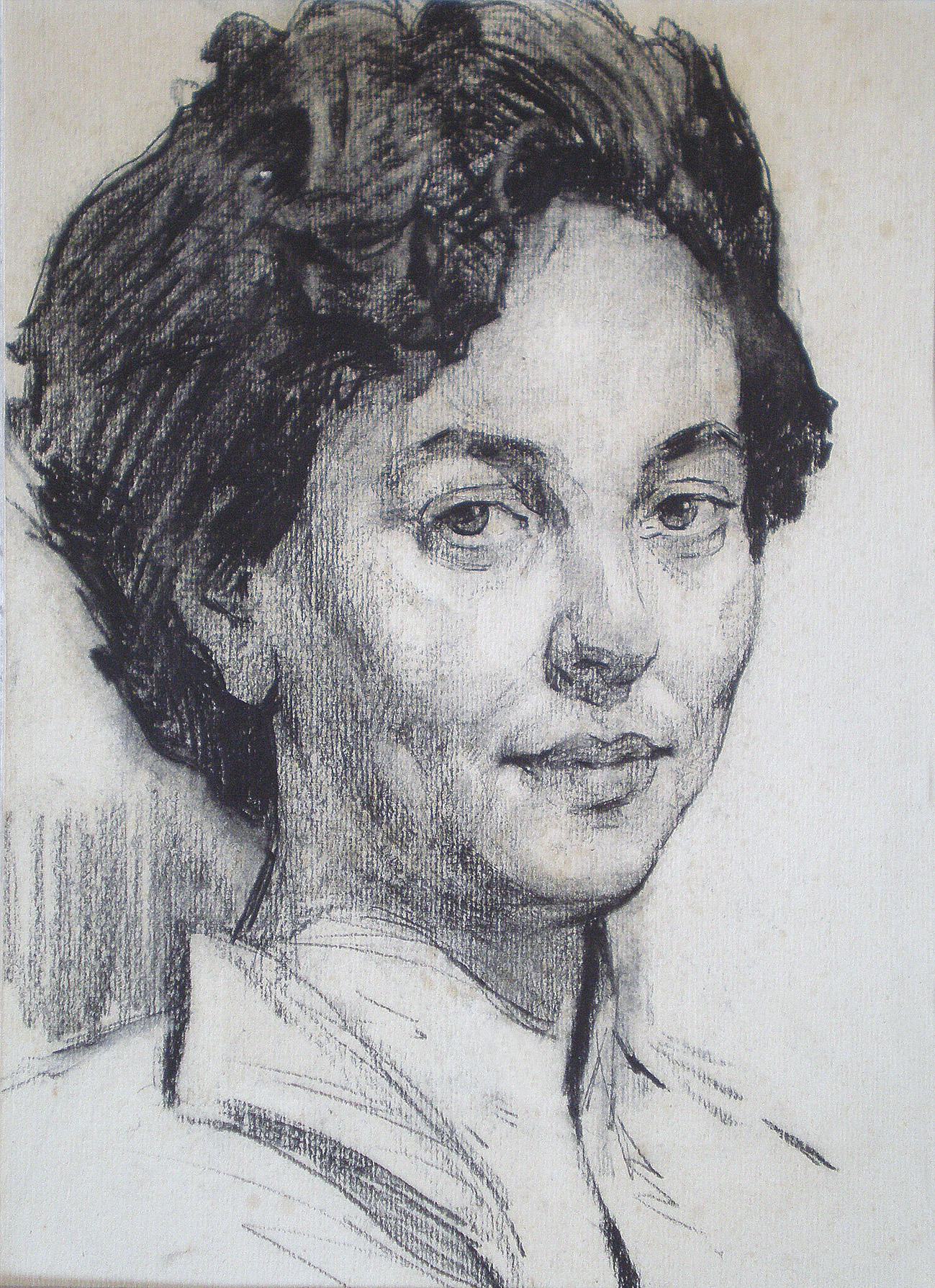
Zoya, 1959

However, his most frequently portrayed model was his wife Zoya. He drew portraits of her often: at the seaside, sleeping, lying sick in bed with a high fever, running to the skating rink, reading a book, dreaming, sad, leaning over her textbooks and exhausted after a busy working day.

Amongst his works there also were commissioned portraits of outstanding historical personalities: Nikolay Przhevalsky, Victor Hugo and Heinrich Heine. For each one he managed not only to convey the portrait features, but also recreate a characteristic emotional image, as some echo of their famous literary masterpieces or scientific achievements.

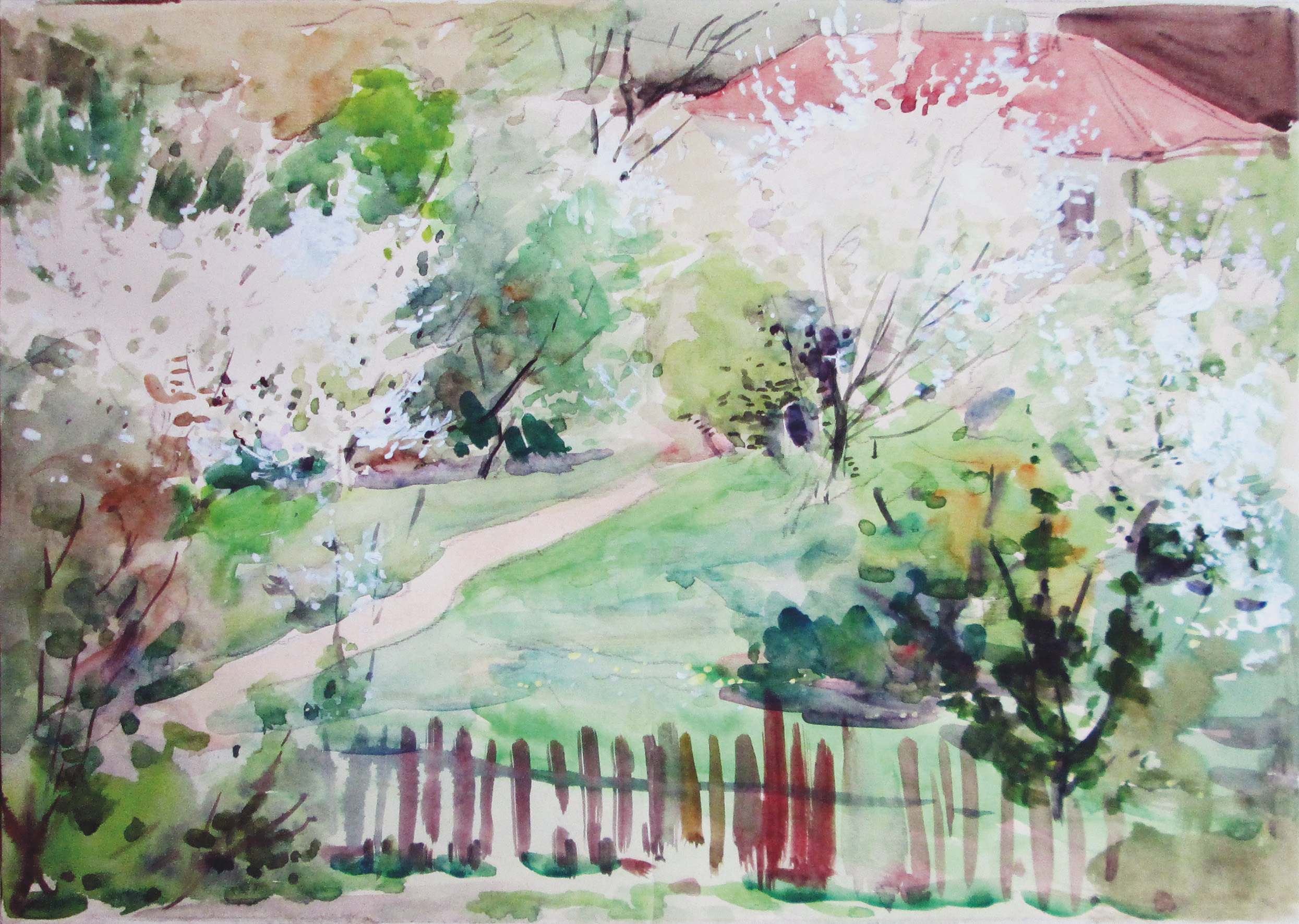
Gardens in Bloom, 1960

His pencil drawings are unique in their invocation of the postwar Kyiv atmosphere. Old wooden cottages, curved streets, infrequent cars, Kudryavsky Descent, Andreevsky Descent, Podol; often presenting the quiet city life of the 1950s.

Ginsburg's landscape miniatures are characterized by concise compositions and a restrained approach to natural subjects. His works frequently depict forest clearings, isolated oak and pine trees, meadow edges, early spring branches, flowering apple trees, small bridges, and village streets. Through these everyday rural motifs, he emphasized the aesthetic qualities of ordinary landscapes and presented familiar natural scenes as subjects of broader contemplative significance.

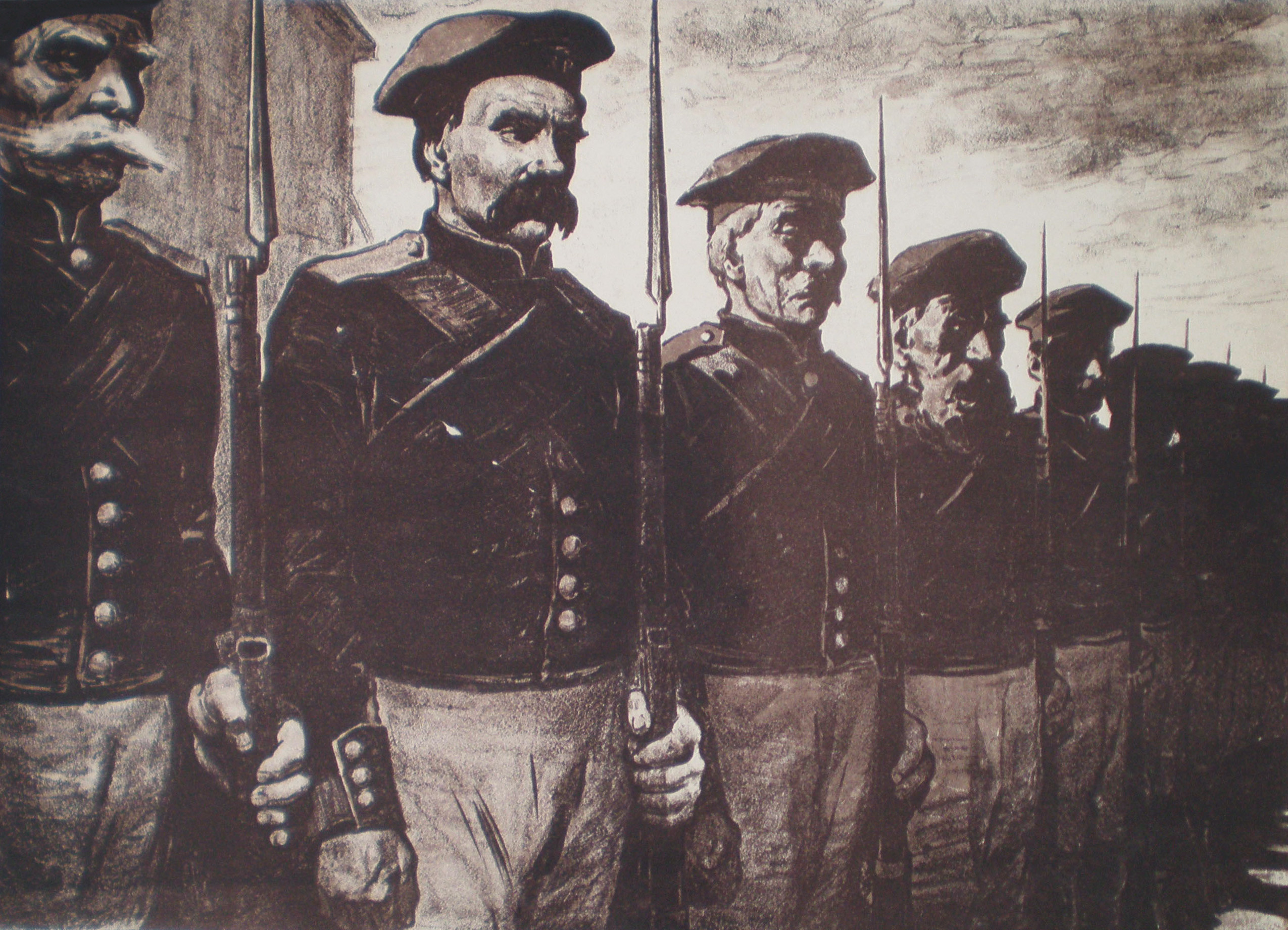
The Poet's Destiny, 1962

Boris Ginsburg was inspired not only by the literary works of the Great Kobzar, but also by his tragic destiny. It resulted in the creation of printed lithographs reflecting the most dramatic moments from the poet's life, when he was exiled by court order to a distant military outpost and banned from writing and drawing. To some degree it was reminiscent of the events in Boris Ginsburg's own life. In the artist's private archive there is a small notebook with sketches of numerous searches for various characters from T. Shevchenko's poems. The only completed works were created for the poems "The Owl" and "The Neophyte". The illustrations to Lesya Ukrainka's poems "The Sinner" and "In the Catacombs" are imbued with the unvanquished spirit. It's no coincidence that of all her poems the artist chose the ones with main themes of strong spirit, freedom or striving to break out of slavish submission even by paying the ultimate price of one's own life. These were the last works in Boris Ginsburg artistic career.

In her memoirs, Boris Ginsburg's widow Zoya Davydovna Gingburg, wrote that "It is very difficult to make people, who did not know Boris, his inner world, fine sense of humour, cheerful laughter and secret sorrow in his eyes, encyclopaedic knowledge, complete and utter helplessness in day-to-day life and constant process of creative search to understand. It is a complicated task, but it is also my duty, so I will try."

Zoya Ginsburg organized three posthumous exhibitions of Ginsburg's work (1964, 2010, 2013) and sponsored the creation of an album dedicated to the artist life's work "Boris Ginsburg, A Bright Light of a Short Life."

In one of the letters to his parents he wrote: "It started snowing a little today, you could see through the window that the street was already white. The day flew by, tomorrow once again business to attend to, work. I couldn't say anything definite about work though; everything is still at a very early stage, I don't even know which one of my numerous ideas to choose. There are plenty of sketches; plenty of themes, there are things to work on ..." (November 4, 1962).

== Exhibitions ==
Exhibited since 1957. Worked in easel and printed book graphic. The main works: : "About People of Work" (1957–1958), "The New Ukrainian Semiletka Buildings" (1959–1960), "People of the Semiletka" (1960–1961) "T. G. Shevchenko" (1961–1962) and illustrations to L. Ukrainka's works (1962) and T. Shevchenko's works (1963).

== Link ==
- https://www.youtube.com/watch?v=DYbeVrF9NSA Video. Ukrainian language.

== Gallery ==
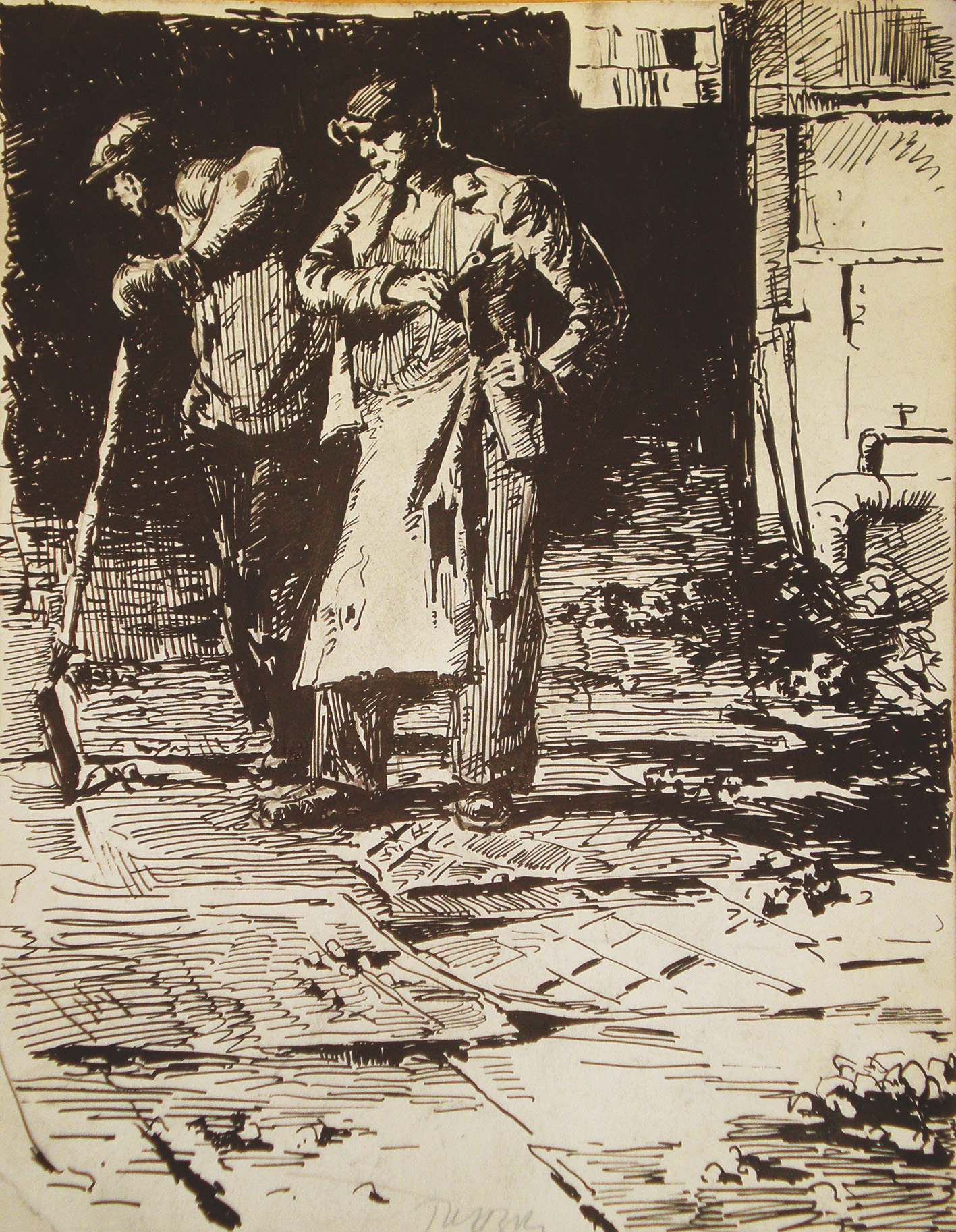
Steelmakers. 1957

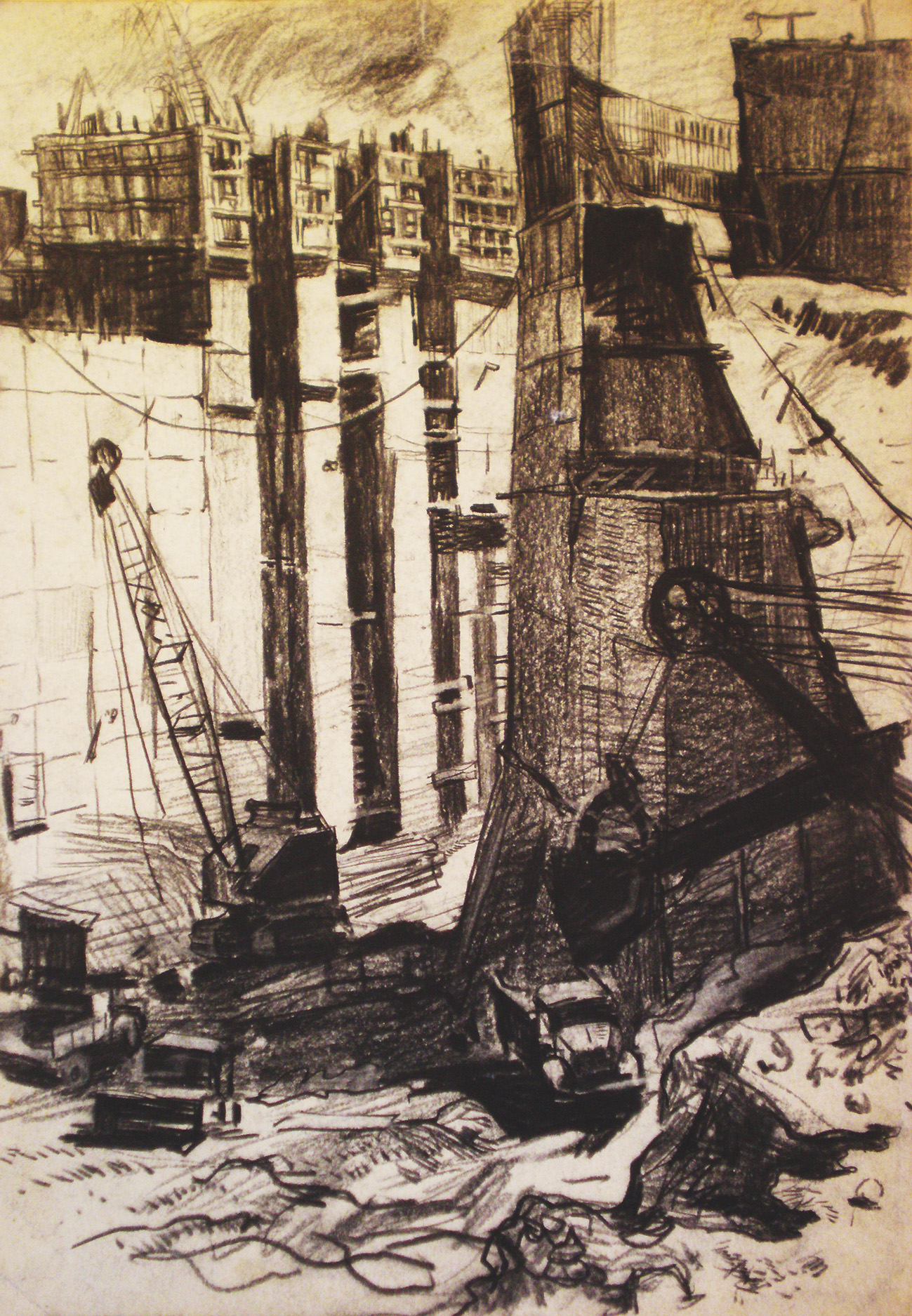
HES Building. 1959

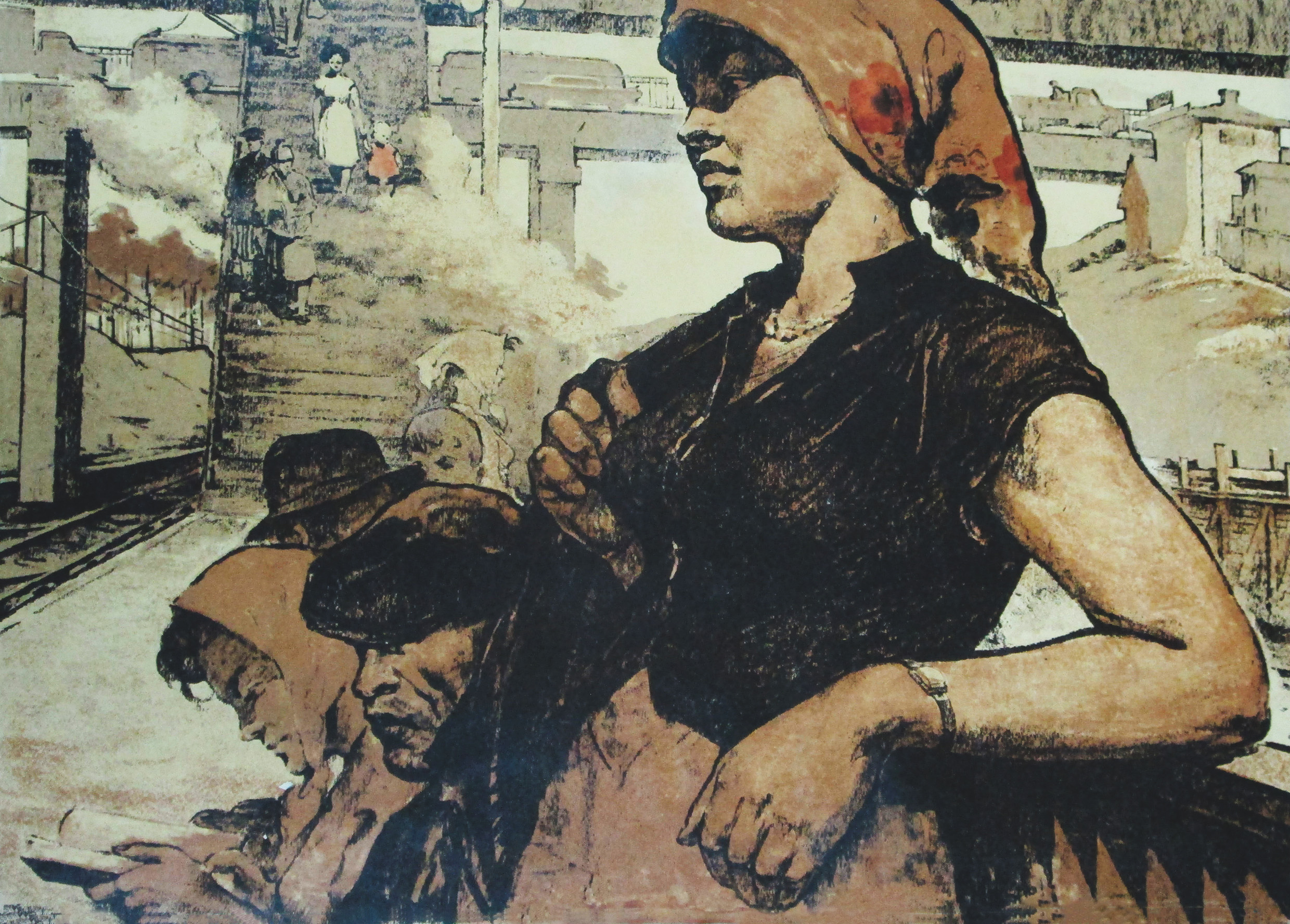
Waiting for a Suburban Electric Train. 1960

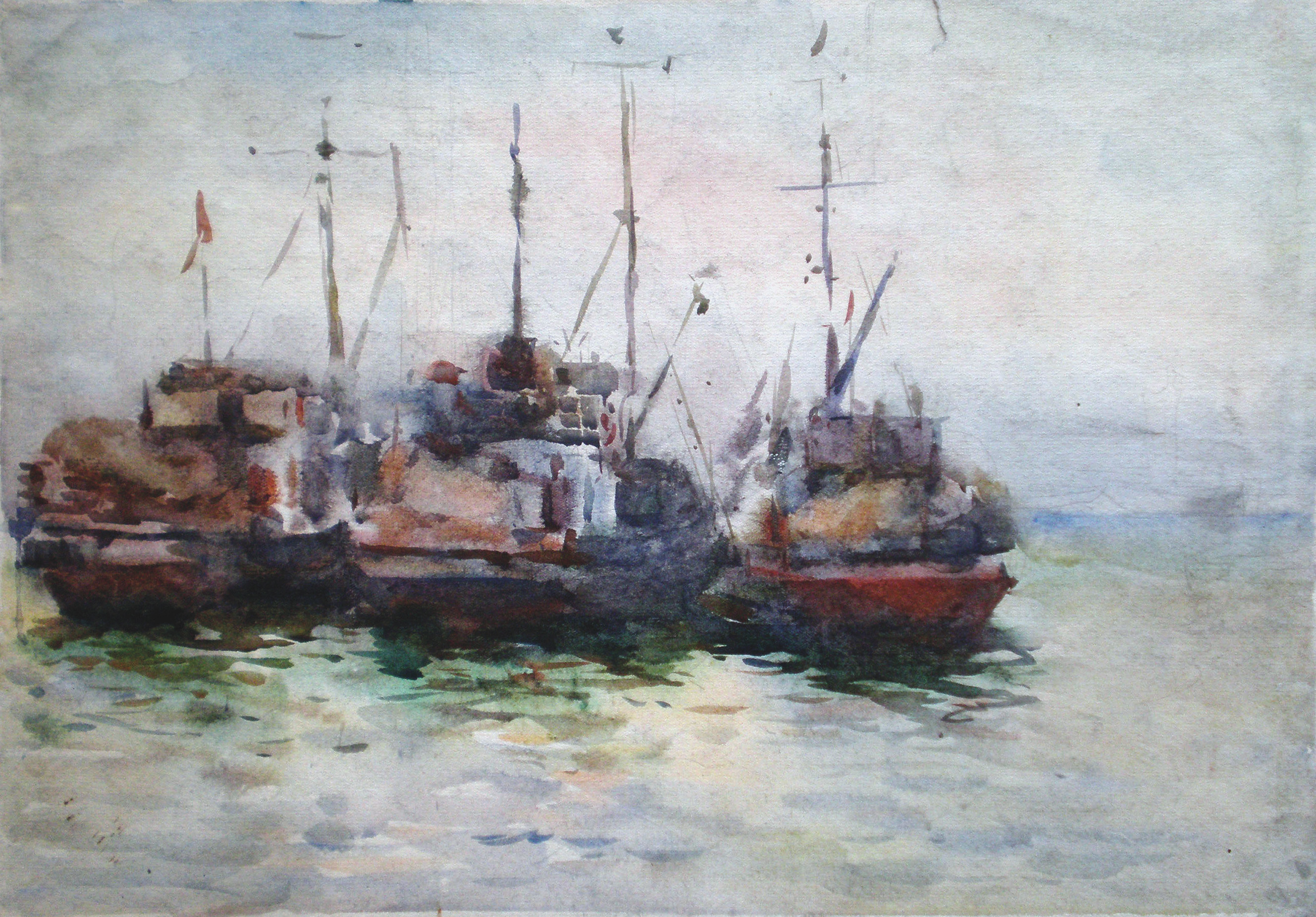
The Three Ships. 1962
