= Shiphra Ginsburg =

Canadian physician-scientist

Academic background
- Education: BA, Queen's University at Kingston; MDCM, 1990, McGill University; MEd, Ontario Institute for Studies in Education; PhD, 2016, Maastricht University

Academic work
- Institutions: University of Toronto

Shiphra Rachel Ginsburg is a Canadian physician-scientist. In 2019, Ginsburg was appointed a Tier 1 Canada Research Chair in Medical Education Research at the University of Toronto.

== Early life and education ==
Ginsburg completed her Bachelor of Arts degree at Queen's University at Kingston and her Medicinæ Doctorem et Chirurgiæ Magistrum (medical degree) at McGill University. Following this, she enrolled at the Ontario Institute for Studies in Education for her Master of Education degree before leaving North America for her PhD at Maastricht University.

== Career ==
Following her PhD, Ginsburg returned to Canada and accepted a faculty position at the University of Toronto (U of T). Upon joining U of T, Ginsburg focused her research on improving the teaching styles of supervisors and improving professionalism in medical education. In 2015, Ginsburg was the Principal investigator for her project "Hidden Meanings: An Exploration of the Influence of Writing Style on Assessment Comments."

As a result of her research, Ginsburg was named Deputy Editor of the journal Medical Education and Director of Education Research and Scholarship in the Department of Medicine. In these roles, she received the Medical Council of Canada’s Outstanding Achievement Award in the Evaluation of Clinical Competence. In 2019, Ginsburg was appointed a Tier 1 Canada Research Chair in Medical Education Research to assist her research in physician learning effectiveness using qualitative and mixed methods techniques. She was also selected as one of 12 international, inaugural Fellows for the Karolinska Institutet Prize for Research in Medical Education.
