= Madeleine Ginsburg =

British dress historian (1928–2020)

Madeleine Betty Ginsburg (née Blumstein; 22 September 1928 – 14 July 2020) was a British dress historian who spent the majority of her career at the Victoria and Albert Museum.

She lived on Warrington Crescent in Maida Vale, west London.
