= Society for the Promotion of Culture among the Jews of Russia =

The Society for the Promotion of Culture among the Jews of Russia (Hebrew: Hevra Mefitsei Haskalah; Russian: Obshchestvo dlia rasprostraneniia prosveshcheniia mezhdu evreiami v Rossii, or OPE; litersally translated as "Society for the Spread of Enlightenment among the Jews of Russia") was an educational and civic association that promoted the acculturation of Russian Jews and their integration in the wider Russian society; founded in 1863, it remained active until 1926 or 1929.

It was founded as a learned society in December 1863, in Saint Petersburg, at that time the capital city of the Russian Empire, by prominent Russian Jews, including Joseph Yozel Günzburg, who became president; his son Horace Günzburg, first vice-president; Rabbi A. Neumann, second vice-president; Leon Rosenthal, treasurer; Abraham Brodski; and I. Brodski. Lithuanian scholar Mattityahu Strashun was an honorary member.

The aim of the society as set forth in its constitution was as follows:

"To promote culture among the Russian Jews and to infuse into them love therefor. To this end the society will endeavor to spread the knowledge of the Russian language among them; it will publish and assist others in publishing useful works and journals in Russian, as well as in Hebrew, that will aid in carrying out the purposes of the society; and it will, further, assist the young in devoting themselves to the pursuit of knowledge and of the sciences."

== Branch societies ==
The idea of establishing such a society in Russia may have been suggested by the Alliance Israélite Universelle, which was founded in 1860. The time was ripe for such an organization in Russia, inasmuch as the awakening of the Jews of that country to their cultural needs was in progress. There were, however, some drawbacks, on account of which the society was unable to carry out its program in its entirety. Its scope of activity was necessarily limited by the disabilities of the Russian Jews and there was, moreover, a lack of interest on the part of the intellectual Jews themselves, the greater number of whom strove to shake themselves free from everything Jewish. The society thus had to struggle on for some time and to satisfy its ambition with minor achievements. For several years the number of members was less than 250, and in 1880 it was not quite 350; the annual income was less than 12,000 rubles. From that year onward, however, interest in the society increased. The anti-Jewish riots, on the one hand, and the restrictions imposed by the government, on the other, impelled Russian Jews to trust to self-help and to take thenceforth more interest in their own institutions. In the next year (1880) the society inaugurated a branch, with a special fund, for the promotion of agriculture and industry among Russian Jews. The number of members increased to 552 and its yearly income was more than doubled (28,246 rubles). But here, again, the attitude of the Russian government toward the Jews checked the society's operations, the prohibition against Jews engaging in agriculture having become more stringent with the accession of Alexander III, thus defeating the object of the new agricultural section. In the other branches, however, the activity of the society was considerable, the report of its twentieth anniversary (1884) showing an expenditure from the foundation of the society of 78,788 rubles for the support of students at universities, academies, and industrial institutions, and for the maintenance of private and public schools; in addition 35,556 rubles were expended in connection with useful publications issued by the society itself or on its initiative. At the same time, a greater interest in Hebrew literature began to manifest itself among the members, and a special fund for its promotion was voted in 1884.

== Chief lines of activity ==
The operations of the society have since extended far beyond Saint Petersburg. As early as 1865 a branch had been founded at Odessa, which issued and maintained the newspaper Den ("The Day"). Other branches were later established at Moscow, Riga, and several other cities; but the most effective work has been done by the Odessa branch. The chief lines of the society's activity are the following:

1. Assistance of Jewish students at the Russian universities;
2. Maintenance of general and industrial schools for Jewish children;
3. Aid to Jewish libraries;
4. Encouragement of Jewish authors and publication of works (in Hebrew and Russian) pertaining to Judaism, prizes being offered for the same; and
5. Promotion of a knowledge of Jewish science by series of lectures, particularly in Saint Petersburg.

Unfortunately, the society has to struggle for existence. Its educational work is being rendered less important in proportion as education progresses among Russian Jews generally. Moreover, the society having been founded at a time when the idea of assimilation with the Russians was prevalent among the Jewish 'intelligentsia, and having, more or less, retained this spirit, it has now to face an internal conflict with the Jewish national tendencies that have recently been awakened in Russian Jewry, and with which many of the members of the society are strongly imbued.

== Sources ==
Bibliography from the 1906 Jewish Encyclopedia

- Leon Rosenthal, Toledot Ḥebrat Marbe Haskalah be-Yisrael, St. Petersburg, 1885–90;
- Ha-Shaḥar, vi. 589 et seq., vii. 337 et seq., ix. 629-631, xi. 60-63;
- Ha-Shiloaḥ, vii. 557; viii. 91, 369; ix. 275, 366 et seq.; x. 89 et seq.; xii. 471; xiii. 280;
- Ha-Maggid, 1864, Nos. 25, 26, 28, 30; 1865, Nos. 24, 26;
- Keneset Yisrael, 1886, pp. xxvii. et seq.;
- Ha-Dor, i., Nos. 5, 7, 9, 22, 23, 25.H. R. A. S. W.
