= Mark Ginsberg =

American scientist

Mark Ginsberg is an American scientist, focusing in molecular structure and function of integrins in immune responses and rheumatology. He is a Distinguished Professor at the University of California, San Diego and a Fellow of the American Association for the Advancement of Science.
