= Jacob Guinsburg =

Brazilian theatre critic (1921-2018)

Jacob Guinsburg (September 20 1921 – October 21 2018) was a Bessarabian-born Brazilian essayist, theatre critic, translator, and book editor. A specialist in Russian theatre, he was also regarded as Brazil's foremost scholar of the Yiddish language.

== Biography ==
Born in Riscani, a small town then under Romanian rule, he moved to Brazil with his family in 1924, settling in São Paulo, more specifically in the neighbourhood of Bom Retiro, known for receiving Jewish, Italian, and Eastern European immigrants. In his youth, he worked as a journalist, writing on literature, arts, and theatre.

In 1947, he launches his editorial career with Editora Rampa, where he organized editions and translated works from English, French, German, Italian, Spanish, but most importantly, Yiddish. In 1954, as an established editor, he was hired by DIFEL, then one of the country's major publishing houses, where he edited works by Antonio Candido and Sérgio Buarque de Holanda.

Between 1962 and 1963, he studied philosophy at the University of Paris. Upon returning to Brazil, Guinsburg, with the support of his friends, among whom were Anatol Rosenfeld and Boris Schnaiderman, founded the publishing house Perspectiva, dedicated to literary criticism, cultural studies, and social sciences in general.

As a professor, Guinsburg worked at the University of São Paulo School of Dramatic Arts, where he trained actors, and taught at the School of Communications and Arts of the University of São Paulo.
