= Charles M. Ginsburg =

American pediatrician

Charles M. Ginsburg (born 1943) was born in Omaha, Nebraska. Ginsburg is the Marilyn R. Corrigan Distinguished Chair of Pediatric Research, Professor of Pediatrics and the Senior Associate Dean for Academic Administration at University of Texas Southwestern Medical Center in Dallas. Prior to assuming his current position, Ginsburg was Chairman of the Department of Pediatrics at UT Southwestern and Chief of Staff of Children’s Medical Center, positions that he held for 15 years. He served as Interim Dean of UT Southwestern in 2009–2010. Ginsburg has authored over 150 publications and is a nationally respected clinical investigator who primarily focused his interests in infant and childhood infectious diseases.

== Publications ==
- Pediatric Primer. Charles M. Ginsburg. Product Group: Book Publisher: The Summit Publishing Group (25 September 1996) ISBN 9781565302204
- Pediatric Therapy. Heinz F. Eichenwald, Josef Stroder, Charles M. Ginsburg. ISBN 9781556643811
