= Ophira Ginsburg =

Canadian oncologist

- Born: Canada

Academic background
- Education: BSc, MD, 1998, Queen's University at Kingston; MSc, Human Genetics, 1992, McGill University

Ophira Michal Ginsburg is a Canadian oncologist.

== Early life and education ==
Ginsburg was born and raised in Canada, where she completed her undergraduate degree and medical degree. Ginsburg attended Queen's University at Kingston for her Bachelor of Science degree before enrolling at McGill University for her Master of Science degree in human genetics. Ginsburg eventually returned to Queen's for her medical degree before accepting a residency and fellowship at the University of Toronto (U of T).

== Career ==
As an adjunct scientist at Women's College Research Institute and an assistant professor at U of T, Ginsburg traveled to rural Bangladesh to improve the health conditions of women. While there, her research team educated women on breast health and established the countries first breast center. As a result of her global health efforts, Ginsburg was awarded one of 15 Rising Stars in Global Health Awards from Grand Challenges Canada. The following year, she also named a 2013 YWCA Women of Distinction Awards for her innovative work to improve the lives of women and girls.

In 2015, Ginsburg was appointed a Medical Officer by the World Health Organization to help create guidelines and programs to provide earlier diagnosis and treatment of cancers affecting women. She was also recognized as one of the Top 300 Women Leaders in Global Health by the Graduate Institute of International and Development Studies. At the same time, Ginsburg published research which indicated that South Asian women, excluding those of Chinese descent, were more likely to be diagnosed at a higher stage of breast cancer than the general population. Two years later, she was named the Director of NYU Langone Health's Perlmutter Cancer Center's High Risk Program for patients with hereditary syndromes that increase cancer risk. In 2020, Ginsburg was appointed an inaugural Elsa Atkin Distinguished Fellow at the George Institute for Global Health. During the COVID-19 pandemic, Ginsburg co-authored a paper in Nature Cancer titled "Eliminating cervical cancer in the COVID-19 era." In 2022, Ginsburg won the American Society of Clinical Oncology's Humanitarian award. Ophira Ginsburg was also recognized as one of the 100 Influential Women in Oncology by OncoDaily.
