= Asher ben Löb Günzburg =

Chief Rabbi of Karlsruhe, Germany (1754 - 1837)

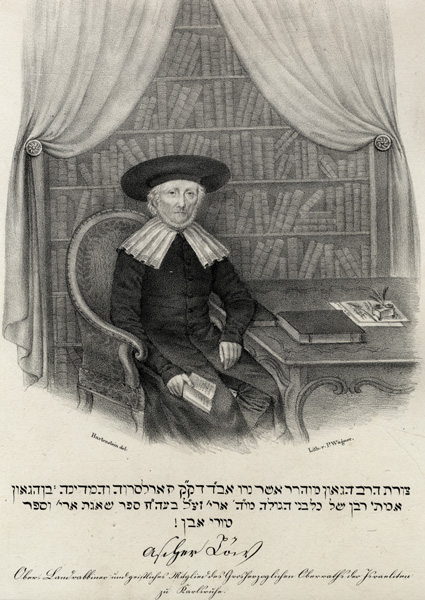
- Rabbi Asher Löw, around 1820
- Title: Rabbi

Personal life
- Born: 1754 Minsk, Polish–Lithuanian Commonwealth
- Died: July 23, 1837 (aged 82–83) Bühl

Religious life
- Religion: Judaism

Asher ben Löb Günzburg (1754 - July 23, 1837) was a prominent rabbi who served as the chief rabbi of Karlsruhe. Günzburg was also an ancestor of the French historian Marc Bloch.

== Biography ==
Günzburg was born in Minsk as the son of Aryeh Löb, the rabbi of Metz. He studied under his father and assisted him in running his rabbinical college, especially after he became blind.

In 1783, Günzburg was elected as the rabbi of Niederwerrn, and in 1785, as the rabbi of Wallerstein. His significant appointment came in 1810 when he was elected as a member of the consistory and chief rabbi ("Oberrath" and "Landrabbiner") of the Grand Duchy of Baden. This position was part of the reorganization of Jewish congregations by the Grand Duke of Baden, following the Napoleonic model.

In his second marriage, he married Sara Worms from Saarlouis, widow of the Chief Rabbi of Mainz, Samuel Wolf Levi (1751–1813). She died in 1854 in Gießen.

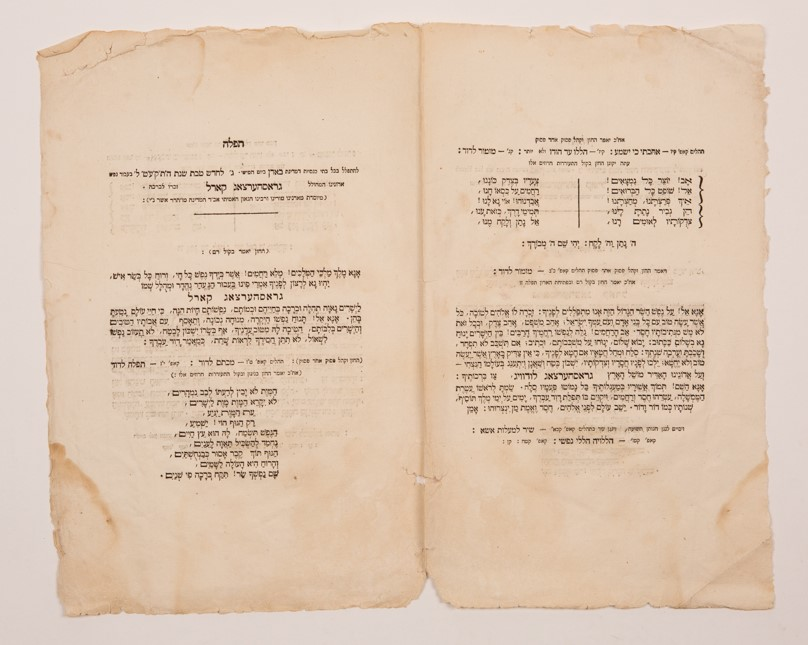
Prayer for the Soul of the Late Grand Duke Karl, written by Ascher Löw

Günzburg was known for his strict adherence to Talmudic teachings and his orthodox views, although he was tolerant of differing opinions. Despite being offered prestigious positions, such as chief rabbi of Paris and Metz, he declined them and remained in Karlsruhe until his death. In his later years, due to poor health, his assistant Elias Willstätter took over many of his duties.

Günzburg contributed to rabbinical literature, sending various manuscripts to Wilna. His legacy continued through his son Abraham Ascher, who served as a rabbi in Bühl until his death in 1838.
