= Marc Ginsberg (violinist) =

American violinist

Marc Ginsberg is an American violinist and former principal second violinist of the New York Philharmonic Orchestra.

== Life ==
He graduated from The Juilliard School, where he studied with Margaret Pardee, Ivan Galamian, and Paul Makanowitzky. He was a Fulbright scholar. He formed the Cleo Quartet, and played with the Aeolian Chamber Players.

He plays solos for the orchestra, including the Vivaldi "Concerto for Four Violins", and Elgar, "Introduction and Allegro for Strings".

== Family ==
He is married to the violinist Judith Ginsberg. He is a friend of Emanuel Ax.
