= Karl Siegfried Günsburg =

German Jewish author

- Born: December 9, 1784; Lissa, Polish–Lithuanian Commonwealth
- Died: January 23, 1860 (aged 75); Breslau, Prussia, German Confederation
- Children: Friedrich Günsburg

Karl Siegfried Günsburg (December 9, 1784 – January 23, 1860) was a German author and Reform Jewish preacher.

== Biography ==
Karl Siegfried Günsburg was born in Lissa in 1784. He received a private education before studying at the Königliche Wilhelms-Schule and (between 1806 and 1810) the Maria-Magdalenen-Gymnasium in Breslau. He afterwards pursued studies in philology and philosophy at the University of Berlin.

Between 1813 and 1814, he co-published the German-Jewish weekly Erbauungen, oder Gottes Werk und Wort in collaboration with Eduard Kley. Günsburg also delivered sermons at the Jacobson Temple in Berlin for a period. He settled with his family in Breslau in 1819, where he actively engaged with the Jewish community, demonstrating his commitment by donating his library on August 19, 1859, to the Lehr- und Leseverein, an institution founded by Abraham Geiger in 1842.

Among his notable literary contributions are Parabeln, a work spanning two volumes published in Berlin in 1820 (expanded to three volumes in Breslau in 1826), and Der Geist des Orients, published in Breslau in 1830. Collaborating with Kley, he also co-published a prayer-book titled Die Deutsche Synagoge, presented in two parts and released in Berlin between 1817 and 1818.

== Publications ==
- Erbauungen, oder Gottes Werk und Wort. Berlin. 1813–1814. With Eduard Kley.
- Siegfried Günsburg, C.; Günsburg, Karl Siegfried (1820–1826). Parabeln. Vol. 1–3. Berlin and Breslau.
- Der Geist des Orients. Breslau: Aderholz. 1830.
- Kley, Eduard; Günsburg, Karl Siegfried (1817–1818). Die deutsche Synagoge, oder Ordnung des Gottesdienstes für die Sabbath- und Festtage des ganzen Jahres zum Gebrauche der Gemeinden, die sich der deutschen Gebete bedienen. Vol. 1–2. Berlin. With Eduard Kley.
