= Jason Ginsburg =

American actor, author and producer

- Born: Dallas, Texas, US
- Website: www.jasonginsburg.com

Jason Ginsburg is an American actor, author and producer. A former tour guide at Universal Studios Hollywood, he is best known as the creator of @FakeThemePark, a comedy Twitter and Facebook account that satirizes the theme park industry. Ginsburg used tweets from @FakeThemePark as the basis for his 2018 book, If The Princess Rolls Her Eyes, Your Wish Will Come True.

In September 2023, Ginsburg released "Children of the Night", the first song about the Universal Monsters since "Monster Mash." The song was co-written with video game composer Eduardo Garcia Rascon and sung by vocalist Brette Alana.

Ginsburg studied film and theatre at the University of Southern California. He co-produced and co-starred in Padmé, which won the 2008 George Lucas Selects Award at The Official Star Wars Fan Film Awards. He produced Ask the Astronaut, a Science Channel original web series in which Mike Massimino shared his experiences of space travel. He co-wrote, co-produced, and performed in Tales of Tinder, a comedy/reality web series for Playboy. Ginsburg also co-wrote Age of Stone and Sky: The Sorcerer Beast, a low-budget fantasy film starring Corey Feldman and Jeffrey Combs.
