= Debra M. Ginsberg =

American author (born 1962)

- Born: June 15, 1962 (age 64); London, England
- Education: Reed College (BA)
- Occupation: Author
- Children: 1

Debra M. Ginsberg (born June 15, 1962) is a British-born American author.

== Adult life and works ==
Debra Ginsberg was born in London. She attended Reed College, receiving a B.A. in English. She gave birth to her son, Blaze Ginsberg, in 1987. He is also a writer.

Ginsberg spent twenty years working as a waitress, which were the basis of her first book, the memoir Waiting: The True Confessions of a Waitress (2000). The book chronicled her evolution as a writer, and gave a behind-the-scenes look at working in restaurants. She went on to write two more memoirs, published in 2002 and 2004, both relating to her family life.

She has also written multiple novels, which have received various minor accolades such as the now-defunct SCIBA T. Jefferson Parker Mystery Award. Additionally, Ginsberg works in the publishing industry as a book editor and reviewer for various literary agencies and publications.

== Bibliography ==
=== Memoirs ===
- Waiting: The True Confessions of a Waitress (2000)
- Raising Blaze: A Mother and Son's Long, Strange Journey Into Autism (2002)
- About My Sisters (2004)

=== Novels ===
- Blind Submission (2006)
- The Grift (2008)
- The Neighbors Are Watching (2010)
- What The Heart Remembers (2012)
