= David Ginsburg (chemist) =

Israeli research pioneer

- דוד גינצבורג
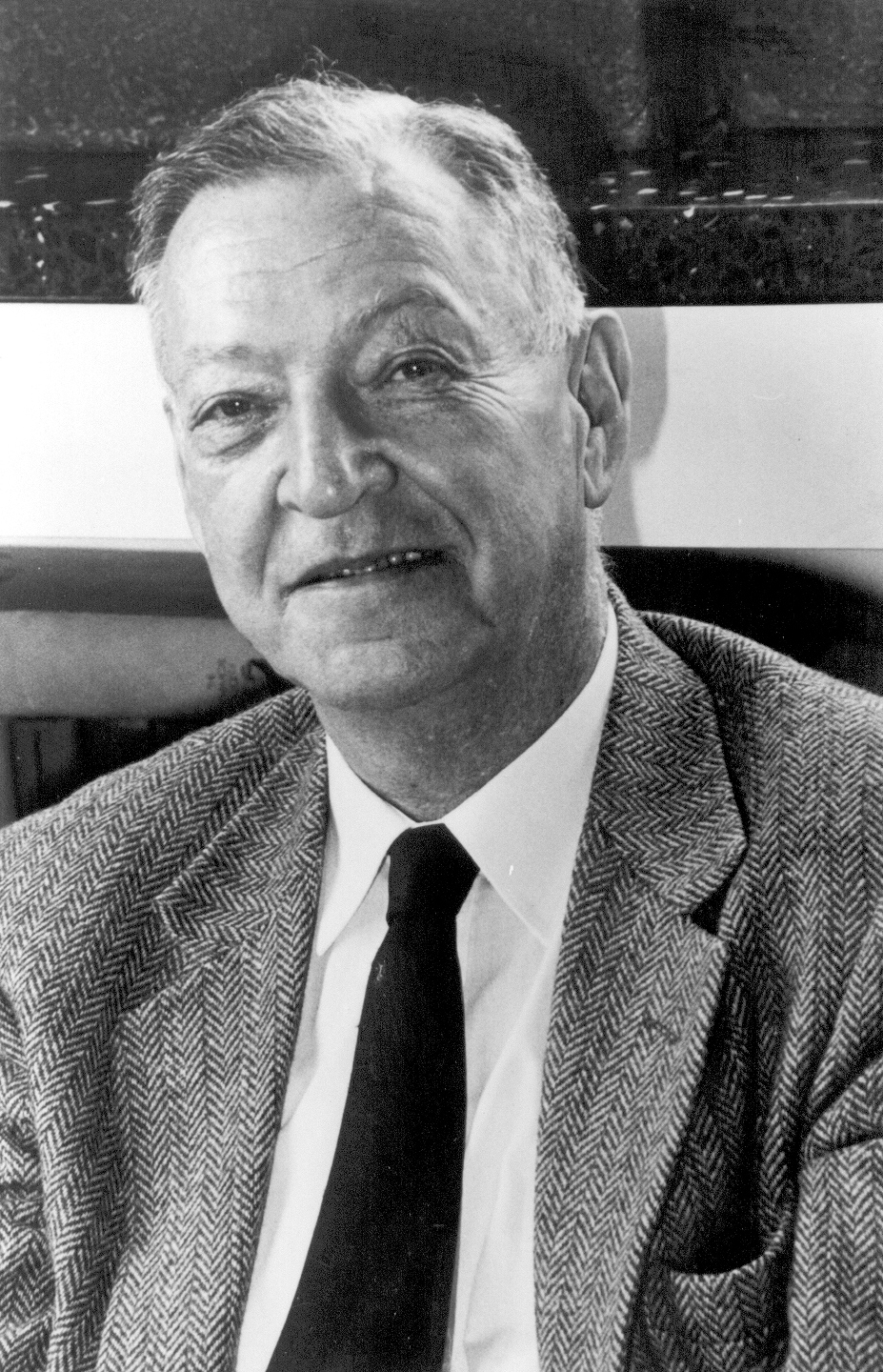
- Born: 1920; New York City, United States
- Died: 1988 (aged 67–68); Israel
- Education: BSc, City College of New York (1941); MSc, Columbia University (1942); PhD, New York University (1947)
- Known for: Synthetic organic chemistry, natural products, total synthesis of morphine
- Notable work: Non-Benzenoid Aromatic Compounds (1960), Opium Alkaloids: Selected Topics (1962)
- Awards: Israel Prize (1972, Exact Sciences)
- Scientific career
- Fields: Chemistry
- Institutions: Weizmann Institute of Science; Technion – Israel Institute of Technology

David Ginsburg (Hebrew: דוד גינצבורג; 1920–1988) was an Israeli research pioneer in the synthetic organic chemistry industry. He was born in New York City. At the age of 13 he immigrated to mandatory Palestine.

== Research ==
Ginsburg's main topic of research – that caused some international hype and controversy was the structure of natural products and the total synthesis of morphine. He was also involved heavily in the biosynthesis of alkaloids and insulation materials. He contributed to the first studies of Bfronflnim and the application of mass spectroscopy as well as the study of soapy structure.

== Academia ==
Ginsburg studied at the Herzliya Hebrew Gymnasium in Tel Aviv between 1933 and 1937. From 1948 to 1954, he worked at the Weizmann Institute of Science in Reḥovot. In 1954 he moved to the Haifa Technion to take on the role of professor of chemistry. For a year from 1961, he was acting president. Other roles he held there included: VP for research, dean of students and VP for development.

In 1976, Ginsburg was elected to the Israel Academy of Sciences (1976 ) and the Chemical Society of America, Japan, Switzerland and the UK.

He was also a visiting professor at other highly reputable scientific institutions including: Brandeis University, Cambridge University, Oxford University, Stanford University, Heidelberg’s Max Planck Institute and the University of Paris. He was president of the Israel Chemical Society and a member of the National Council for Research and Development.

== Education ==
He has a Bachelor of Science from City College of New York (1941), a master's from Columbia University (1942) and a doctorate in chemistry from New York University (1947).

== Books ==
In 1960 Ginsburg edited the book Non-Benzenoid Aromatic Compounds. Two years later he authored Opium Alkaloids: Selected Topics, published by Interscience Publishers. He also wrote: Structure and Reactions, Weinheim: Verlag Chemie (Monographs in Modern Chemistry, v. 7), Propellanes: Structure and Reactions: sequel I (July 1975-December 1980), Haifa: Technion-Israel Institute of Technology, Department of Chemistry, 1981. ( the book is a continuation of the book by that name appeared Boweinheim in 1975; presented in articles published between July 1, 1975, to December 31, 1980.

== Awards ==
In 1972 Ginsburg received the Israel Prize for Exact Sciences. In 1954 he received the Weizmann Prize for Exact Sciences Research and in 1965, the Rothschild Prize.
