= Benjamin Ginsberg (businessman) =

Benjamin Ginsberg (Беньямин-Тевья Гинзбург, 15 January [O.S. 3 January] 1886, Moscow, Russian Empire – 14 February 1944, Cape Town, South Africa) was a Russian-born South African businessman, credited with pioneering the commercialisation of rooibos.

Having arrived in the Cederberg region after the Second Boer War, Ginsberg joined his father, who ran a trading post over thirty kilometres south of Clanwilliam, Western Cape, on the present-day Hexrivier farm.

From about 1903, Benjamin Ginsberg peddled in the valley and the mountains on foot and with a mule cart. In that period, he learnt about rooibos tea. The young travelling salesman was introduced to rooibos in the Grootkloof valley, ten to fifteen kilometres from Hexrivier. Ginsberg could have been offered the beverage on a visit to local farmers. He would have also seen Coloured harvesters process their crop at tea stations near the settlement of Algeria.

Ginsberg started buying rooibos from harvesters and selling it to his customers in the area. By 1912, he had relocated to Clanwilliam and opened a shop in the present-day Visser Street. From there, he expanded his operations over the Cederberg and further afield. Reportedly, Ginsberg also encouraged White farmers to collect and process rooibos on a large scale.

By the late 1920s, growing demand for the tea led to problems with supply of the wild rooibos plants. As a remedy, Dr Pieter Lefras Nortier, district surgeon in Clanwilliam and avid naturalist, proposed to develop a cultivated variety of rooibos to be raised on appropriately situated land. Nortier worked on cultivation of the rooibos species in partnership with farmers Oloff Bergh and William Riordan, and with encouragement from Benjamin Ginsberg. The variety developed by Nortier has become the mainstay of the rooibos industry enabling it to expand and create income and jobs for inhabitants of rooibos-growing regions.

Benjamin Ginsberg created and launched the oldest existing brand of packed rooibos tea, Eleven O’Clock.

After Benjamin's death, his son Charles took over the business, introducing sophisticated machinery to cut the unusual leaves and building large “courts” on his farms in which to dry and cure the tea under the hot Cederberg sun. He was soon supplying tea seed to hundreds of farmers and promoting his Eleven O' Clock brand and its healthful properties (e.g. caffeine-free) across a variety of channels, including cinema advertising, which was still new to South Africa. Charles began distributing internationally and, although he sold the business in the 1970s, the brand is still widely distributed and the distinctive 1940's Eleven O' Clock packaging, depicting a mother and daughter serving tea, remains almost unchanged.

In the 1990s, spurred on by greater consumer awareness of different teas, brand diversity and mainstream distribution (particularly through supermarkets), international demand for Red Bush tea increased dramatically.
