= Joseph Günzburg =

Russian financier and philanthropist (1812–1878)

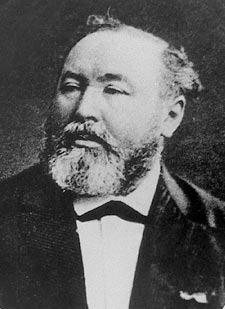

Joseph Günzburg (or Iosif-Evzel; Russian: Иосиф-Евзель; Russian: Осип Гаврилович Гинцбург, romanized: Osip Gavrilovich Gintsburg; 1812 in Vitebsk – 12 January 1878 in Paris) was a Russian financier and philanthropist who became a baron in 1874. He was the son of Gabriel Günzburg and the father of Horace Günzburg.

Having acquired great wealth during the Crimean War, Günzburg established a banking firm at St. Petersburg. There he began to labor on behalf of the welfare of the Jewish community. In November 1861, he was appointed by the Russian government as a member of the rabbinical commission, the meetings of which lasted five months. He exerted himself to raise the standard of the education of the Jews. To this effect, he founded the Society for the Promotion of Culture Among the Jews in 1863 with the permission of the Russian government, and he served of as president of the Society till his death. Owing to Günzburg's efforts, the regulations concerning the military service of the Jews were in 1874 made identical with those of the peoples of other creeds. He also instituted a fund for the Talmud Torah religious school of Vilna, his father's native town. The Günzburgs were ennobled by the Grand Duke of Hesse-Darmstadt in 1871, and Joseph received the title of baron on 2 August 1874.

== Bibliography ==
- Fuenn, Keneset Yisrael, p. 460;
- Archives Israélites, 1878, p. 89

New title	Baron Günzburg; 1st creation 2 August 1874-12 January 1878	Succeeded by Horace Günzburg; David Günzburg; Alexander Günzburg; Gabriel Jacob "Jacques" de Gunzburg; Nicolas de Gunzburg
