= List of Loyola University New Orleans people =

Many notable politicians, entertainers, and figures in United States history are alumni of Loyola University in New Orleans, Louisiana. These include former members of the United States House of Representatives, members of the Louisiana House of Representatives and Louisiana State Senate, high-ranking presidential United States Cabinet officials, a former head of state, a recipient of the Presidential Medal of Freedom, and numerous music celebrities, including opera star Norman Treigle. The university is also home to a number of high-profile professors, including Walter Block, the free market economist and anarcho-capitalist associated with the Austrian School. This is a list of notable people associated with the university.

== Academics ==
- John Biguenet, Robert Hunter Distinguished Professor
- Walter Block, Harold E. Wirth Eminent Scholar chair in Economics and professor of Economics
- Nicholas Capaldi, ethicist and philosopher
- Theodore John Dimitry Jr., professor of Ophthalmology (1915–1940)
- Sanford Hinderlie, Conrad N. Hilton chair of Music Industry Studies at Loyola University New Orleans, educator, jazz pianist, composer, record producer
- Patrick R. Hugg, John J. McAulay Distinguished Professor of Law
- Adil Hussain Khan, distinguished professor of Religious Studies
- Laura Murphy, lead slavery researcher, later professor in the UK
- Angel Adams Parham, associate professor of Sociology
- William P. Quigley, law professor and director of the Law Clinic and the Gillis Long Poverty Law Center
- Ronal W. Serpas, professor at Loyola; superintendent of the New Orleans Police Department, 2010–2014
- Harry Shearer, professor, longtime voice actor for The Simpsons
- Lowell C. Smith, dean of the College of Business Administration
- Bernard J. Ward, '44 & '49, longtime professor at Loyola, Notre Dame Law School, and University of Texas School of Law; expert in federal judiciary and federal procedure
- Kevin Wildes, president of Loyola; expert in the field of bioethics
- Mark Yakich, poet, editor, painter, and Gregory F. Curtin, S.J., Distinguished Professor of English

== Arts ==
- Chris Donahue '83, Academy Award-winning film producer
- Amy Guidry, '98, painter
- Claire Keegan, '92, Irish writer

== Science ==
- Carl H. Brans, '57, physicist and co-developer of the Brans–Dicke theory of gravitation
- Donald Wetzel, '51, inventor of the ATM

== Education ==
- Norman Francis, L'55, president of Xavier University of Louisiana and recipient of the Presidential Medal of Freedom

== Politics ==
- Ben Bagert, '68, member of both houses of the Louisiana State Legislature, 1970–1992
- Larry S. Bankston, '76 Law, Louisiana state senator from Baton Rouge, 1988–1996
- Joseph Cao, former U.S. representative for Louisiana's 2nd congressional district in the United States House of Representatives
- Hezekiah Leonard Clark, Jr., Democratic Executive Committee, District "E", and president of the 9th Ward Citizen Voters League of New Orleans, Louisiana; United States Marine Corps sharpshooter, triple distinguished shooter: Rifle, Pistol and International; Master Shooter, the highest rating of the National Rifle Association
- Edwin Compass, '00, '02, superintendent, New Orleans Police Department
- Patrick Connick, '83, state representative from Jefferson Parish
- James R. Domengeaux, former member of the United States House of Representatives from Lafayette
- Jim Donelon, former state representative and current state insurance commissioner
- Adrian G. Duplantier, L '49, former state senator in the Louisiana State Legislature and federal judge of the United States District Court for the Eastern District of Louisiana
- Manuel A. Esquivel, '62, former prime minister of Belize
- Olaf Fink, master's degree, member of the Louisiana State Senate, 1956–1972; New Orleans educator
- C.B. Forgotston, former New Orleans resident, attorney, political activist, and fellow of the Loyola Institute of Politics
- Charles Foti, L, former attorney general of Louisiana
- Kim Gandy, L '78, president of the National Organization for Women
- Ray Garofalo, current District 103 member of the Louisiana House of Representatives
- Anthony Guarisco, Jr., 12-year state senator from Morgan City; law school graduate in 1966
- William J. Guste, attorney general of Louisiana, 1972–1992; instrumental figure in the Carter-Mondale election of 1976
- Paul J. Hardy, attorney and former lieutenant governor of Louisiana
- Cynthia Hedge-Morrell, member of the New Orleans City Council, 2005–2014; retired educator
- Mitch Landrieu, L'85, mayor of New Orleans; lieutenant governor of Louisiana(2006–2010); candidate for the 2006 New Orleans mayoral election
- Moon Landrieu, '52, L'54, former mayor of New Orleans; former secretary of the U.S. Department of Housing and Urban Development; former Louisiana Fourth Circuit Court of Appeals judge
- Jeff Landry, Law, governor-elect of Louisiana, 45th attorney general of Louisiana (2016-present), former Republican member of the United States House of Representatives from Louisiana's 3rd congressional district, elected 2010
- Harry Lee, L'67, former sheriff of Jefferson Parish
- Joseph Lopinto, B.A. and Law, member of the Louisiana State House from Jefferson Parish
- Danny Martiny, Law, member of the Louisiana State Senate from Jefferson Parish
- A.J. McNamara, Law, member of the Louisiana House (1976–1980), U.S. District Judge (1982–2001)
- Edwin R. Murray, '82, L'85, member of the Louisiana State Senate
- Sean O'Keefe, '77, former NASA administrator; former Louisiana State University chancellor; former United States Secretary of the Navy
- Vance Plauché, '18, member of the United States House of Representatives from Lake Charles, 1941–1943
- John R. Smith, member of both houses of the Louisiana State Legislature since 1988, Leesville businessman
- Elmer R. Tapper, '52, former member of the Louisiana House of Representatives from St. Bernard Parish
- Ray Tarver, Dentistry '52, member of the Louisiana House from Natchitoches Parish, 1964–1968
- Suzanne Haik Terrell, L'84, former Louisiana commissioner of Elections; Republican councilwoman in the New Orleans City Council; special adviser to President George W. Bush in the Economic Development Administration
- Richard Alvin Tonry, '67, former member of the United States House of Representatives from Louisiana's 1st congressional district
- Mack A. "Bodi" White, Jr., state representative from East Baton Rouge Parish
- Robert Wilkie, L'88, former assistant secretary of Defense and special assistant to the president for National Security Affairs
- J. Skelly Wright ('32, L'34), former U.S. Court of Appeals for the District of Columbia judge, famous for ordering the desegregation of Louisiana schools and college during the Civil Rights Movement

== Sports ==
- Zeke Bonura, Major League Baseball player
- Lloyd Bourgeois, Olympic track and field member
- Bernard S. Flint, Thoroughbred racehorse trainer
- Eddie Flynn, boxer
- Bucky Moore, football player
- Richie Petitbon, football player and coach
- Sammis Reyes (MBA 2018), basketball player who later converted to American football and became the first Chilean to play in the NFL
- Michael Smith, host of ESPN's Numbers Never Lie and His and Hers
- Emmett Toppino, Olympic track and field gold medalist

== Law ==
- Pascal F. Calogero, Jr., '54, former chief justice of the Louisiana Supreme Court
- Adrian G. Duplantier, '49, federal judge and former Louisiana state senator
- Tim Kappel, assistant professor of music industry studies at Loyola.
- Jeannette Knoll, '66, associate justice of the Louisiana Supreme Court
- Michael H. O'Keefe, '55, Louisiana State Senate president; convicted felon
- Carl E. Stewart, '74, chief judge, U.S. Court of Appeals for the Fifth Circuit
- Chet D. Traylor, '74, associate justice of the Louisiana Supreme Court, 1997–2009

== Journalism ==
- Andrew Callaghan, journalist, host of Channel 5 and former host of All Gas No Brakes
- Tom Llamas, ABC News anchor and correspondent

== Entertainment ==
- Royd Anderson, '98, documentary filmmaker
- Charles Anthony, tenor
- Maria Celeste Arraras, Telemundo presenter
- Mia Borders, 2010, singer-songwriter
- Paul Bouche, '91 TV producer, host, comedian, A Oscuras Pero Encendidos
- Wanda Brister, mezzo-soprano
- Elise Cambon, pedagogue
- Harry Connick, Jr., award-winning jazz singer, pianist, and humanitarian
- Brent Crayon, 1995, pianist and musical director
- Kyan Douglas, television personality and grooming expert
- Ruth Falcon, '64, soprano and pedagogue
- G-Eazy, born Gerald Gillum, rapper
- Victor Goines, jazz saxophonist and clarinetist
- Greer Grimsley, bass-baritone
- Bryan Hymel, tenor
- Anthony Laciura, '74, tenor and actor
- Rick Margitza, tenor saxophonist, played with the Maria Schneider Orchestra
- Ellis Marsalis, '86, jazz pianist and recording artist
- Victor J. Montilla, '98, president, Puerto Rico Corporation of Public Broadcasting
- Jim Paratore, television producer and executive (The Ellen DeGeneres Show), co-creator of TMZ
- Beth Patterson, '93, Irish and Celtic musician and producer
- Petey, musician and TikTok personality; real nme Peter Martin
- Aristos Petrou, musician
- Marguerite Piazza, '40, soprano and entertainer
- Natalia Rom, soprano
- Biff Rose, '55, comedian and artist
- Audrey Schuh, '50, soprano
- Harry Theyard, '57, tenor
- Mary Tortorich, '42, pedagogue
- Norman Treigle, '51, bass-baritone
- Phyllis Treigle, '81, soprano

== Business ==
- Tom Benson, '48, owner of the New Orleans Saints and Fox Broadcasting Company affiliate WVUE-DT
- Philip J. Carroll, '58, former CEO of Shell Oil; appointed in 2003 by President George W. Bush to head the policy planning advisory board of the Iraqi Oil Ministry

== Photo gallery ==
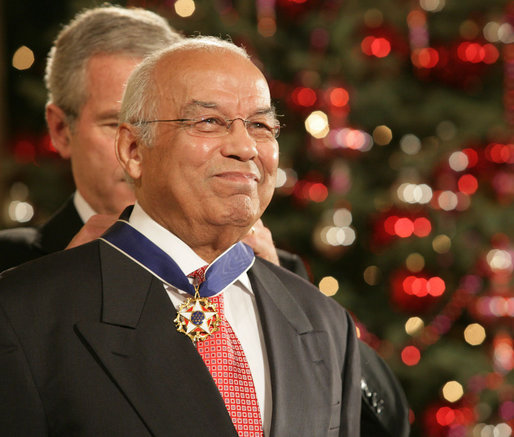
Norman Francis receiving Presidential Medal of Freedom in 2006 from President George W. Bush

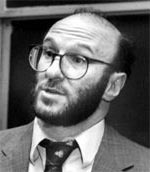
Walter Block, Harold E. Wirth Eminent Scholar chair in Economics and professor of Economics associated with the Austrian School

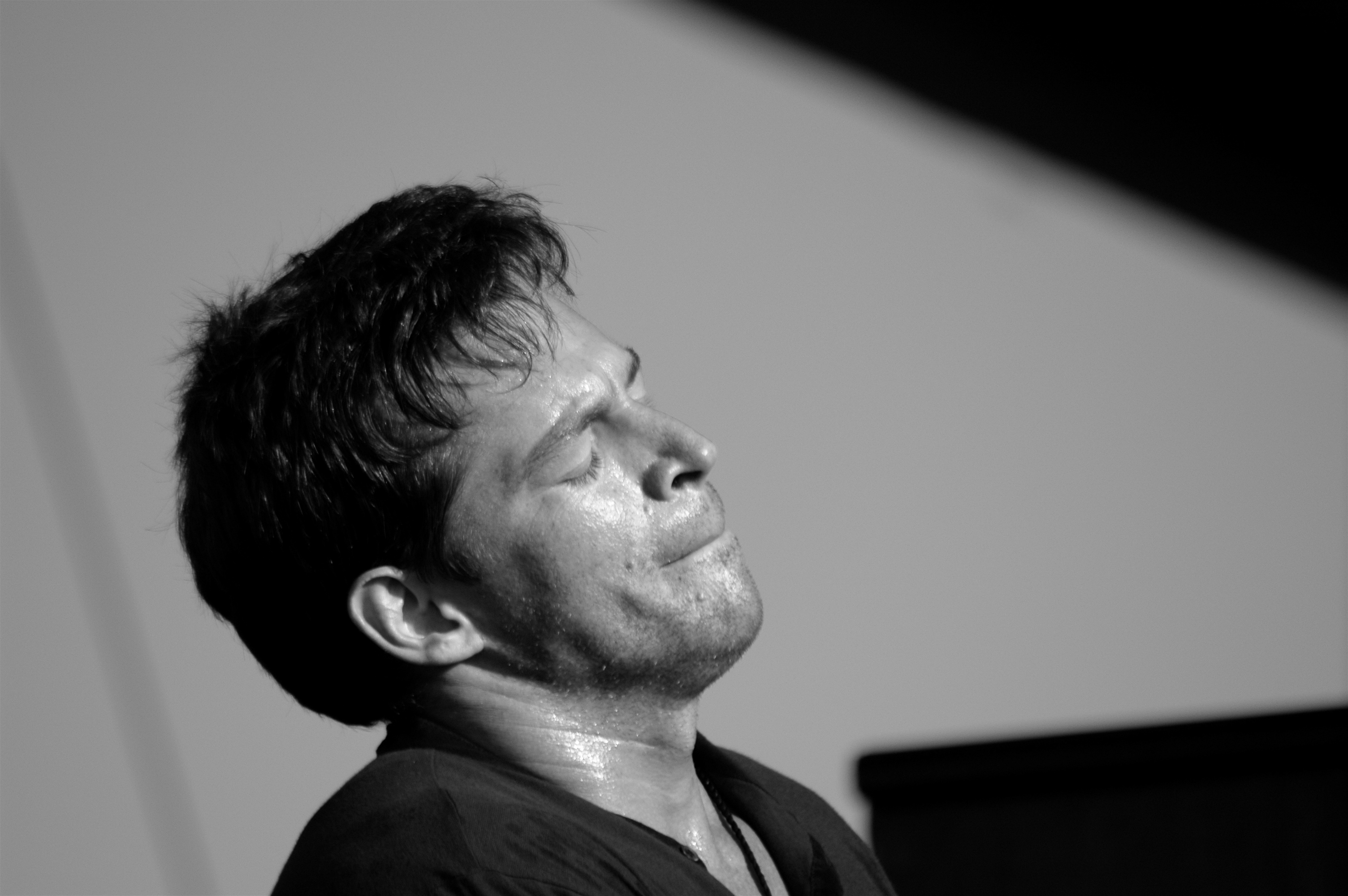
Harry Connick, Jr., international musician, actor, and humanitarian

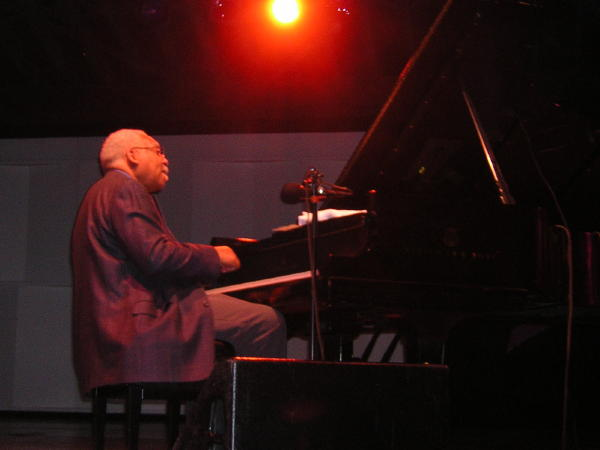
Ellis Marsalis, Jr, considered one of the premier pianists in modern jazz

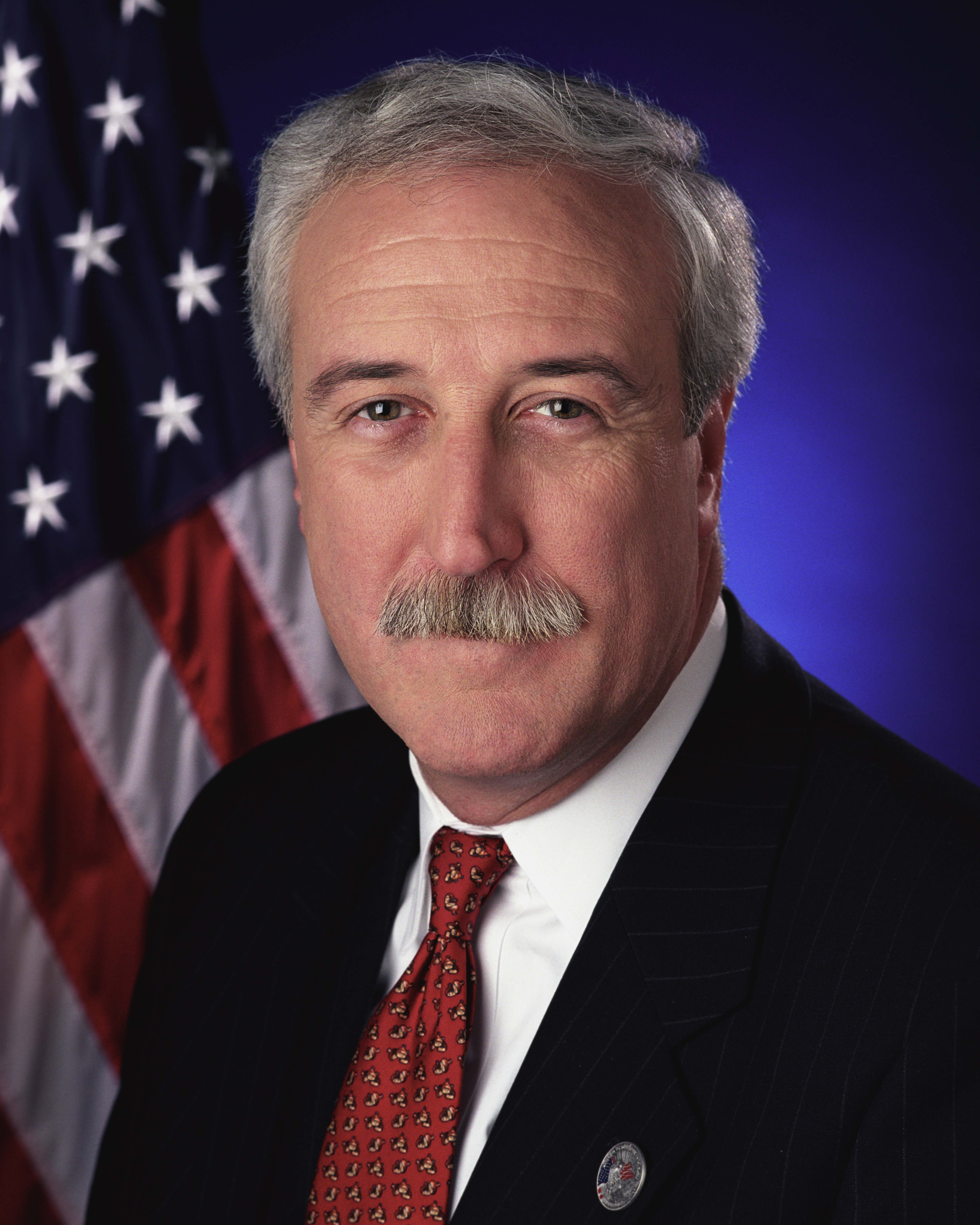
Sean O'Keefe, former Navy secretary under President George H. W. Bush, former LSU chancellor, former NASA administrator under President George W. Bush

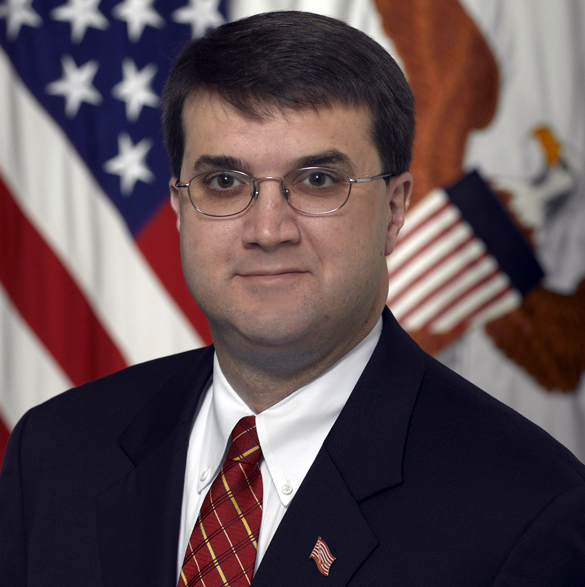
Robert Wilkie, assistant secretary of Defense under President George W. Bush
