= Hugg =

Hugg is a surname. Notable people with the surname include:

- Dick Hugg (1928–2006), American radio personality
- Herman Hugg (1921–2013), American artist
- Mike Hugg (born 1942), English musician
- Patrick R. Hugg, American legal scholar

== See also ==
- Hug (disambiguation)
