= Hug (disambiguation) =

A hug is a form of physical intimacy.

Hug, Hugs or HUG may also refer to:

== Miscellaneous ==
- Hug (folklore), in Scandinavian mythology, referring to mental life
- Hugs (interpreter) (Haskell User's Gofer System), a bytecode interpreter

== Arts and entertainment ==
- Hug (album), a Japanese album by Yui Aragaki
- "Hug" (TVXQ song), 2004
- Hug (Sid song), 2014
- Hugs (song), a song written and recorded by American comedy hip hop group The Lonely Island with Pharrell Williams
- "Hug" (Smallville), an episode of the television series Smallville

== People ==
- Hug (surname) (various people)
- Hug I of Empúries (965–1040), Count of Empúries
- Ulysses S. Grant, born Hiram Ulysses Grant (HUG), 18th President of the United States

== Places ==
- Geneva University Hospitals (French: Hôpitaux universitaires de Genève, HUG), hospital in Switzerland
- Hughesdale railway station, Melbourne
- Hug High School, in Reno, Nevada, United States

== See also ==
- Hog (disambiguation)
- Hugh (disambiguation)
- Hugo (disambiguation)
- Group hug (disambiguation)
- Cuddle (disambiguation)
