= Sanford Hinderlie =

American jazz pianist, composer, educator and record producer (born 1952)

- Born: January 23, 1952 (age 74); Seattle, Washington, U.S.
- Genre: Jazz
- Occupations: Musician; composer; educator; record producer
- Instrument: Piano
- Years active: 1990s–present
- Label: STR Digital
- Education: Washington State University (BM); North Texas State University (MM)
- Employer: Loyola University New Orleans

Sanford Hinderlie (born January 23, 1952) is an American jazz pianist, composer, educator, and record producer. He currently serves as the Conrad N. Hilton Chair of Music Industry Studies at Loyola University New Orleans, a position he has held since 1981.

== Performing career ==
Born in Seattle, Hinderlie developed a passion for playing the piano at an early age, inspired by his musician parents. He obtained a Bachelor of Music from Washington State University and an Master of Music from North Texas State University, studying composition with Martin Mailman, Larry Austin, and Merrill Ellis, and jazz piano with Dan Haerle. In 1981, he relocated to New Orleans, where he dedicated himself to teaching, performing, and recording music.

Hinderlie's jazz style draws from a diverse range of influences. In addition to his original jazz piano compositions, he has created scores for films and videos, including documentaries on the history of New Orleans. Hinderlie was a winner of the Delius Composition Competition. He frequently collaborates with other musicians, including John Rankin, Tom McDermott, Tony Dagradi, Steve Masakowski, Larry Sieberth, Johnny Vidacovich, Tom van der Geld, and Günter Heinz.

Hinderlie regularly performs at venues and festivals in the United States, particularly in New Orleans, and held a residency at the Pelican Club in the city's French Quarter for 25 years (1991–2016). His performances have extended beyond the United States to venues in Germany, Panama, Denmark, the Netherlands, Singapore, Hong Kong, and Japan. He has also appeared as a guest artist at events like the Yerevan International Jazz Festival in Armenia, the United States Embassy in Tbilisi, Georgia, and the Lingnerschloss in Dresden, Germany.

== Teaching, research, and producing ==
Hinderlie is also an educator, researcher, and producer. He helped develop recording studios and labs at Loyola University to provide students with learning opportunities in music technology. He has also created internships in local recording studios and radio stations, including WWOZ-FM.

Hinderlie has secured external grant funding totaling over $1.8 million, and has held notable positions such as the Benjamin Distinguished Professor of Music and the Rita O. Huntsinger Distinguished Professorship of Music. In 2017–2018, he received an ATLAS grant from the Louisiana Board of Regents to complete his collaborative recording Summer Haze (2021). He has been affiliated with various professional associations, including the College Music Society, the Music and Entertainment Industry Educators Association, the Association for Technology in Music Instruction, the Society of Electro-Acoustic Music in the United States, and the National Academy of Recording Arts and Sciences.

Since 1995, Hinderlie has produced, recorded, and mastered 26 CDs under his STR Digital Records label, which are distributed worldwide by CPI Distribution.

== Critical reception ==
Hinderlie's innovations in music technology have drawn interest from critics. On the opening of the Music Technology Center at Loyola University in 1989, Joseph LaRose of the Clarion Herald noted Hinderlie's role as director of the center, reporting that "Between 120 and 300 students will use the center every year, learning music theory, composition, electronic music, jazz, commercial music, and recording techniques." Describing the center's equipment and opportunities, LaRose observed that "Electronic ingenuity has gone far beyond plugging electric guitars into gargantuan amplifiers, and thanks to its new Music Technology Center, Loyola music students are part of the electronic music revolution." That same year, the Loyola Maroon detailed how Hinderlie's Synthesis 2000 ensemble "stretches the bounds of modern music through carefully manipulated computer-controlled synthesizers", describing the result as an "eclectic mélange of sounds and rhythms ... a blend of classical, jazz, new age, funk, improvisation and rock all added together." Noting that his 1989 visit to the Tbilisi Conservatory in the Republic of Georgia (Soviet Union) had served as a key cross-cultural exchange, the Maroon reflected on how Hinderlie's travels and his experiments in electronic music "allow him to expand and diversify his already unique musical style."

Hinderlie's accomplishments as a performer and composer have also received press attention. Music critics for the New Orleans Times-Picayune have described his playing as "vivid and exhilarating", noting that his musical effects were "purposefully applied, with little waste motion for the sake of chic, and the musicality and theatricality of his pieces [are] mutually supportive." These critics have also described Hinderlie as "one of the most inventive and solidly accomplished talents in town. As George Crumb did in the 1960s, Hinderlie employs unorthodox methods but comes up with an entertaining product unlikely to antagonize even the most conservative. Either by instinct or by design, he composes for the audience as well as for the musician. ... [He is] a musician of great authority and appeal." Similarly, critic Melissa Wong noted the "fluidity of his interpretations", characterizing Hinderlie's presence as a performer as "exclusive to the stage, making constant contact with his instrument and fellow musicians. He demonstrate[s] self-confidence, yet he remain[s] personal with the audience with casual joking over the microphone between songs."

On the eve of a performance in 1996, critic Ann McCutchan of Wavelength magazine called Hinderlie "definitely one-of-a-kind on the New Orleans music scene, [who] has lately been going national with his improvisational dreamscapes." McCutchan observed Hinderlie's constant efforts at refinement of his work, "filing away ideas for new pieces that he says will employ more live percussion instruments and complex electronic rhythm effects", quoting Hinderlie's desire "to spark people's imaginations so they can carry my music one step beyond the live performance and create their own sound pictures, their own dreams."

In his later years, Hinderlie's efforts as an educator and advocate for student development have also received attention. Detailing the changing fortunes at Loyola University New Orleans, OffBeat magazine reported in 2015 that "when Loyola recently restructured its degree programs as a result of falling enrollment (not unlike other universities nationwide and locally), the Music Industry Studies program was left intact ... because it's growing", naming Hinderlie as one of the core Music Industry Studies faculty. Most recently, Offbeat named him the recipient of the 2021 Lifetime Achievement in Music Education Award, citing his 40-year career in bringing new recording and performing technology to music students in Louisiana and his co-founding the Bachelor of Science degree in Popular and Commercial Music at Loyola, one of the fastest-growing majors in the university.

== Discography ==
=== As musician ===
- Solo Flight (STR Digital, 1995) – solo piano
- Patchwork: A Tribute to James Booker (STR Digital, 2003) – featuring Marcia Ball, Henry Butler, Leigh Harris, Joe Krown, Tom McDermott, Josh Paxton, and Larry Sieberth
- Hinderlie Plays Hinderlie (STR Digital, 2004) – solo piano
- Christmas in New Orleans (STR Digital, 2010) – solo piano
- Summer Haze (STR Digital, 2021) – piano with Tom van der Geld (vibraphone)

=== As producer ===
With Guy Beck

- Sacred Ragas (1998)
- Sacred Sound: Experiencing Music and Chant in World Religions (Wilfrid Laurier University Press, 2001) – CD accompaniment to book
- Sacred Sound: Music and World (Wilfrid Laurier University Press, 2005) – CD accompaniment to book

With Evan Christopher

- Clarinet Road I (2002)
- Clarinet Road II (2002)
- Clarinet Road III (2011)
- Clarinet Road IV: Bayou Chant (2016) – featuring David Torkanowsky, Joe Ashler, Roland Guerin, and Brian Seegar

With Joe Krown

- Just the Piano, Just the Blues (1997)
- Down and Dirty (2000)
- Buckle Up (2001)
- Funk Yard (2002)
- The New Orleans Piano Rolls (2003)

With Tom McDermott

- All the Keys and Then Some (1996, 2002)
- Louisianthology (1998)
- The Crave (2001)
- Danza (2002) – with Evan Christopher
- Choro (2005)
- Live in Paris (2007)

With others

- Mike Hood, Hocus Pocus (2008)
- Clarence Johnson, Dedicated to You (1997)
- Clarence Johnson and Vahag Petian, Love for Sale (1997)
- David Montgomery, Schubert and Loewe: Grand Duos for Piano 4-Hands (Mastered for Sony Germany / Klavier, 1998)
- Annual Offbeat magazine CD sent to subscribers (2005 & 2007)
- Vahag Petian, Trip to New Orleans (1997)
- Kim Prevost, Talk to Me (2002) – featuring Nicholas Payton
- Kim Prevost and Amina Figarova, On Canal Street (2001)
- Kim Prevost and Bill Solley, I Would Give All My Love (2000)
- John Rankin, Guitar Gumbo (2002)
- Ricky Sebastian, The Spirit from Within (2001) – featuring Donald Harrison, Clarence Johnson, Steve Masakowski, Randy Brecker, and Bill Summers
- Xie Xuemei, Xie Xuemei (2001)
