= List of The George Washington School of Business people =

This list of The George Washington School of Business people includes notable graduates, professors, and administrators affiliated with the School of Business at the George Washington University, located in Washington, D.C.

== Alumni ==
=== Business ===
- James C. Boland – businessman
- Nancy Davis – chief investment officer and founder of Quadratic Capital Management
- Ric Duques (BBA, MBA) – former chairman and CEO of First Data Corp.
- Pedro Heilbron (MBA) – CEO of Copa Holdings, S.A.
- Kun-Hee Lee (MBA) – former chairman and CEO, Samsung
- Edward M. Liddy (MBA) – CEO of AIG; former chairman and CEO, Allstate Corp.
- Darla Moore (MBA) – vice president, Rainwater Inc.; founder, Palmetto Institute
- Lowell C. Smith (MBA) – president, Nichols College
- Kathy J. Warden (MBA) – president and CEO, Northrop Grumman

=== Culture ===
- Ina Garten (MBA) – host of Barefoot Contessa
- Ellen Malcolm (MBA) – founder and president, EMILY's List

=== Military ===
- Arnold W. Braswell (MBA, 1967) – United States Air Force general
- George W. Casey Sr. (MBA, 1965) – United States Army major general
- Peter Pace (MBA) – former chairman of the Joint Chiefs of Staff

=== Politics ===
- Shahid Khaqan Abbasi (MBA) – Federal Minister of Petroleum, Government of Pakistan; CEO of Air Blue
- Raya Haffar al-Hassan (MBA) – Finance Minister, Lebanon
- Alaa Batayneh – Jordanian businessman and politician
- Robin Bernstein (MBA, 1981) – businesswoman and diplomat, current United States Ambassador to the Dominican Republic
- Mel Carnahan (B.A., 1954) – lawyer and politician and 51st governor of Missouri
- Kent Conrad (MBA) – United States Senator of North Dakota
- Scott Cowen (MBA) – President, Tulane University
- Randall Edwards (MBA) – Oregon State Treasurer
- Faure Gnassingbe (MBA) – President of the Republic of Togo, 2005–present
- Omar Ayub Khan (MBA) – former Pakistani Minister of State for Finance and current Federal Minister for Power
- William Dale Montgomery (MBA) – former US Ambassador to Bulgaria
- Colin Powell (MBA) – former US Secretary of State and Chairman of the Joint Chiefs of Staff
- Sandiaga Uno (MBA) – current Minister of Tourism and Creative Economy of Indonesia; Vice Presidential candidate in Indonesia's 2019 presidential election (defeated); former Deputy Governor of Jakarta; founder of Saratoga Capital; 47th richest man in Indonesia in 2013

=== Sports ===
- Dina Al-Sabah (MBA) – professional figure competitor
- Patrick Tyrance (MBA) – orthopedic surgeon, former Academic All-American linebacker, for the Nebraska Cornhuskers football, picked by the Los Angeles Rams in the 1991 NFL draft

== Faculty ==
=== Current ===
- Herman Aguinis – researcher and professor of Organizational Behavior and Human Resource Management; current Avram Tucker Distinguished Scholar and Professor of Management
- Tom Geurts – Dutch economist and associate professor of finance; honorary professor, Technische Universität Berlin
- Sanjay Jain – British economist and associate industry professor in the Department of Decision Sciences
- Annamaria Lusardi – Denit Trust Distinguished Scholar and Professor of Economics and Accountancy, who also serves as the Academic Director of the Global Financial Literacy Excellence Center

=== Former ===
- Lowell C. Smith – academic administrator and assistant professor of business administration
