= Worcester Junior College =

- Other name: Central New England Colleges
- Former name: Worcester Youth Men's Christian Association Institute
- Type: Private junior college
- Active: 1905–1989
- Accreditation: NECHE
- Academic affiliations: Northeastern University; Central New England College of Technology
- President: Lowell C. Smith
- Location: 768-772 Main Street, Worcester, Massachusetts, 01610, United States; 42.256960°N 71.810530°W

Worcester Junior College was a private junior college located in Worcester, Massachusetts. Prior to its closure in 1989, Worcester Junior College offered associate degrees in the fields of liberal arts and sciences, and was accredited by the New England Commission of Higher Education.

== History ==
Worcester Junior College began in 1905 as the Worcester Youth Men's Christian Association Institute. At the time, the organization's only academic offering was a course in automobile mechanics. In 1919, the institute became involved in a partnership with Northeastern University, becoming the Worcester Division of the university. In 1926, the school decided to split into a preparatory school and an engineering school.

In 1938, the Institute received a charter to grant associate degrees by Charles F. Hurley, Governor of Massachusetts, and, in the same year, officially changed its name to Worcester Junior College. Some initial plans had utilized the name "Alden Junior College," but Worcester Junior College was used in the official charter. In 1942, ties with Northeastern were officially dropped.

In 1956, Worcester Junior College expanded its course offerings further by including classes in business and the liberal arts. A year later, with a need for more classroom space, the school purchased the historic Dowley-Taylor House at 770 Main Street.

As early as 1960, Worcester Junior College is known to have offered baseball as part of their athletics program.

By 1972, Worcester Junior College began operating as part of the new Central New England Colleges (CNEC), which was also composed of the Central New England College of Technology. The combined institution was based in Worcester, but an additional campus in nearby Westborough was constructed.

In the late 1980s, CNEC experienced major financial issues, largely caused by irregular fiscal administrative practices. In 1988, the institution was placed under the receivership of Nichols College and its head, Lowell C. Smith, was named president. Nichols quickly sought to sell the Westborough campus in order to alleviate financial burden. However, there was a real-estate bubble in the following year and buyers for the property fell through. CNEC was forced to foreclose and closed its doors officially on April 21, 1989.

Today, all records of Worcester Junior College are kept at Nichols College.

== Notable alumni ==
- Arthur E. Chase, politician
- Robert D. Wetmore, politician

== See also ==
- List of colleges and universities in Massachusetts
- Timeline of Worcester, Massachusetts
