= St. Louis Cathedral (New Orleans) =

Basilica in New Orleans, Louisiana

Cathedral-Basilica of Saint Louis, King of France
- St. Louis Cathedral
- Cathédrale-Basilique de Saint-Louis, Roi-de-France (French); Catedral-Basílica de San Luis, Rey de Francia (Spanish)
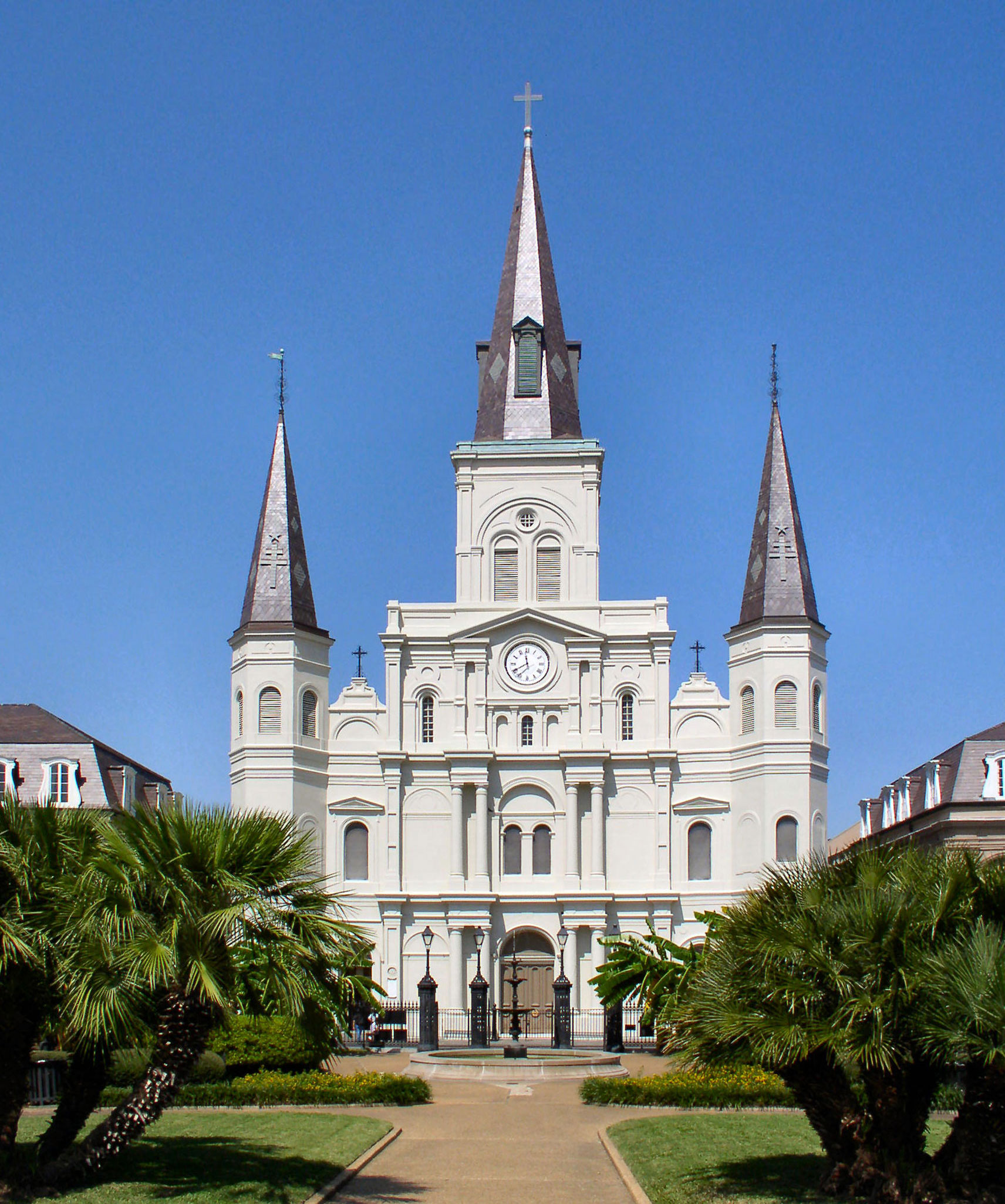
- View of the façade from Jackson Square
- Cathedral-Basilica of Saint Louis, King of France
- 29°57′28″N 90°03′49″W
- Location: Jackson Square; New Orleans, Louisiana
- Country: United States
- Denomination: Catholic Church
- Website: www.stlouiscathedral.org

History
- Status: Cathedral; Minor basilica
- Founded: 1720
- Dedication: Saint Louis

Architecture
- Style: Spanish Colonial (Renaissance); French Neo Gothic
- Groundbreaking: 1789
- Completed: 1850s

Administration
- Archdiocese: Archdiocese of New Orleans

Clergy
- Archbishop: James F. Checchio
- Rector: Philip G. Landry

The Cathedral-Basilica of Saint Louis, King of France (French: Cathédrale-Basilique de Saint-Louis, Roi-de-France, Spanish: Catedral-Basílica de San Luis, Rey de Francia), also called St. Louis Cathedral, is a Catholic cathedral and basilica in New Orleans, Louisiana. It is the seat of the Archdiocese of New Orleans and is the oldest cathedral in continuous use in the United States alongside the Royal Presidio Chapel in Monterey, California. It is dedicated to Saint Louis, also known as King Louis IX of France. The first church on the site was built in 1718; the second church was burned during the great fire of 1788. The third, under Spanish rule, was built in 1789, raised to cathedral rank in 1793 and was expanded and largely rebuilt and completed in the 1850s with little of the 1789 structure remaining.

Saint Louis Cathedral is in the French Quarter of New Orleans, Louisiana, United States, on the Place John Paul II (French: Place Jean-Paul II), a promenaded section of Chartres Street (rue de Chartres) that runs for one block between St. Peter Street (rue Saint-Pierre) on the upriver boundary and St. Ann Street (rue Sainte-Anne) on the downriver boundary. It is located next to Jackson Square and facing the Mississippi River in the heart of New Orleans, situated between the historic buildings of the Cabildo and the Presbytère.

== History ==
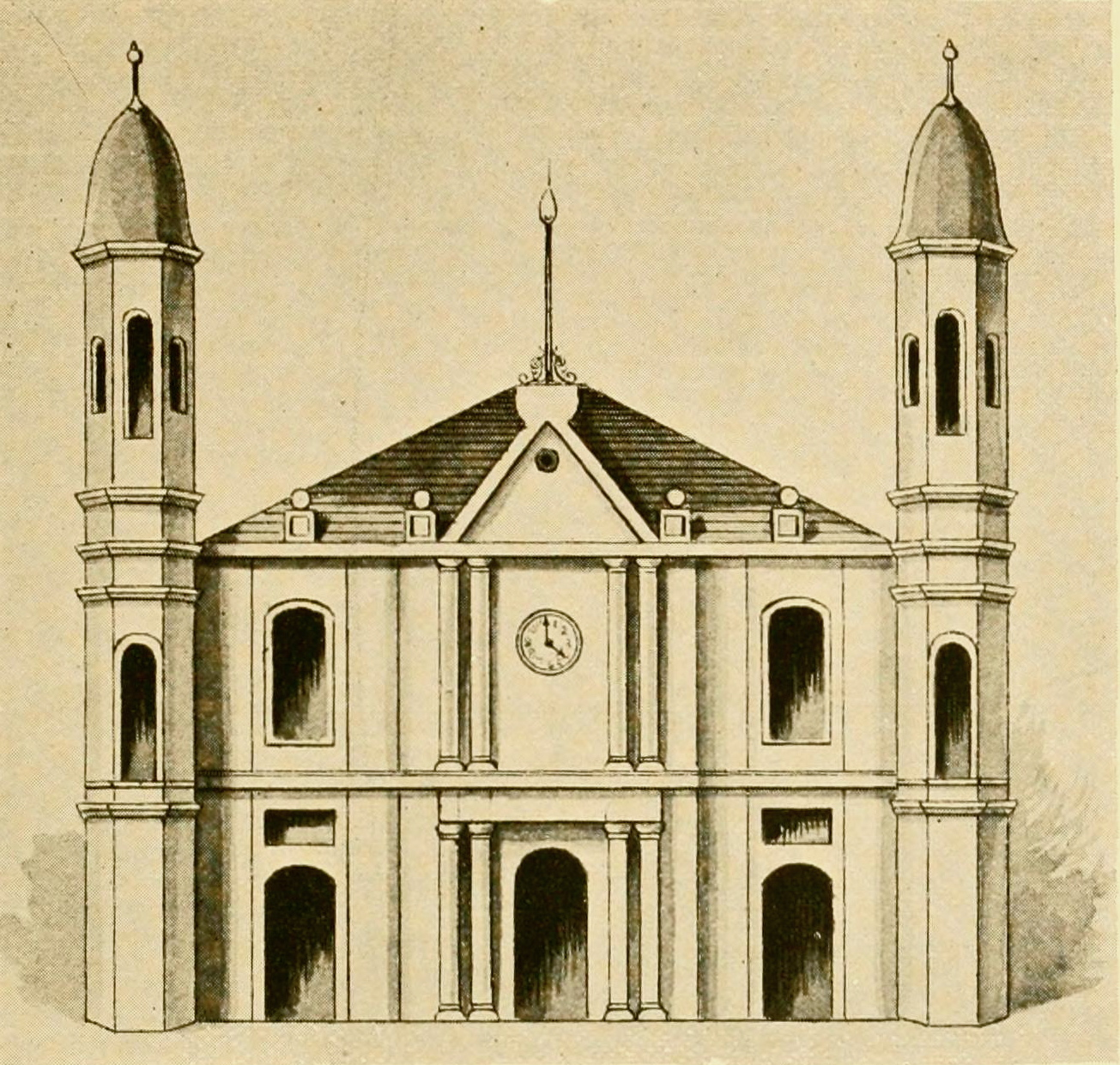
1895 recreation of the Church of St. Louis of 1794, as it looked after it was rebuilt by the Spaniards

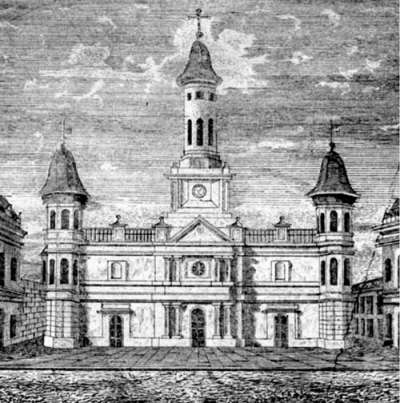
The cathedral in 1838, showing the appearance before the major rebuilding in 1850

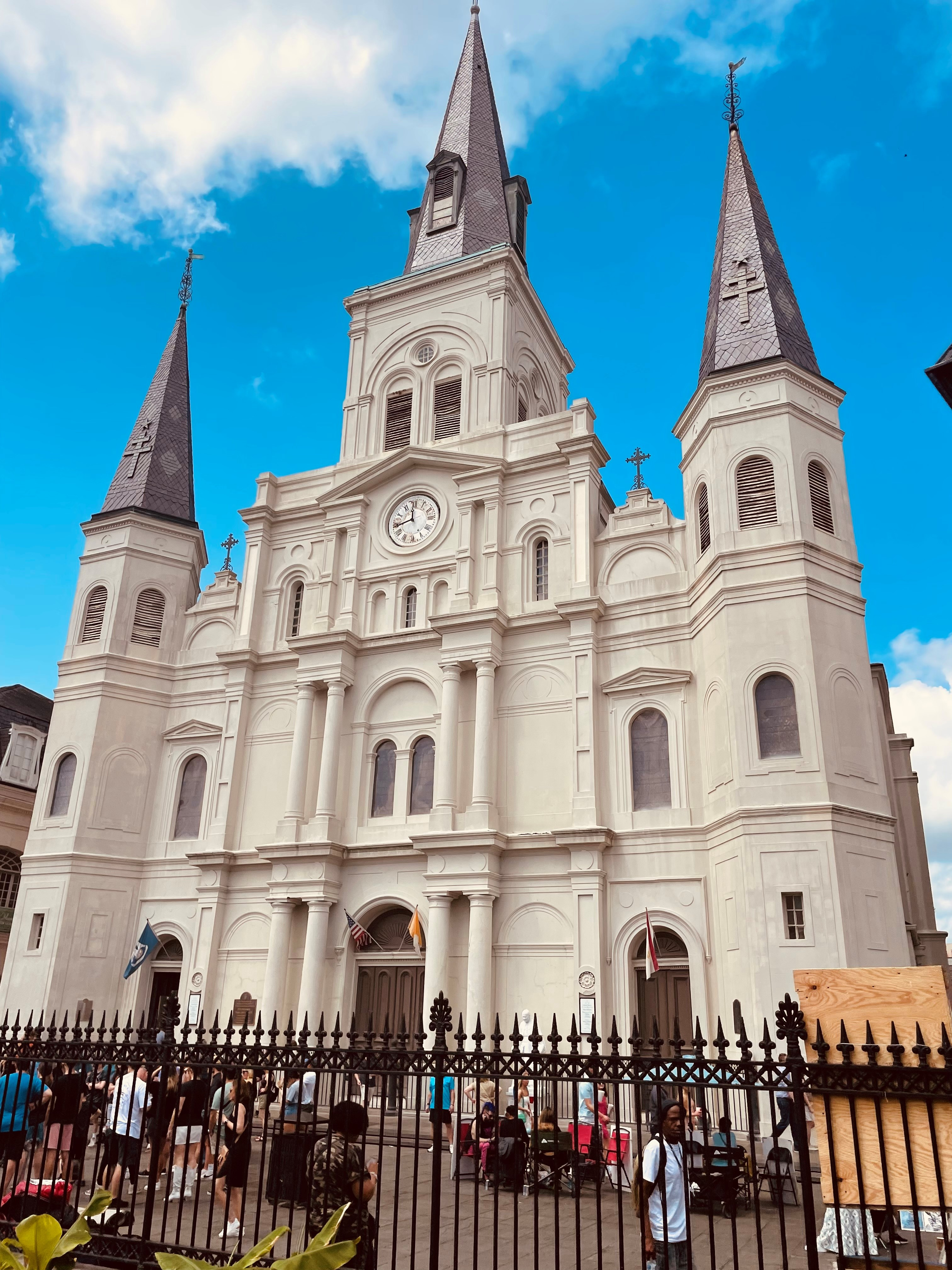
Cathedral from Jackson Square (New Orleans)

Three Catholic churches have stood on the site since 1718, when the city was founded. The first was a crude wooden structure in the early days of the French colony. As the French were Catholic, their church was prominently located on the town square. Construction of a larger brick and timber church was begun in 1725 and was completed in 1727. Along with numerous other buildings, the church was destroyed in the Great New Orleans Fire on Good Friday, March 21, 1788. The cornerstone of a new church was laid in 1789 and the building was completed in 1794 in the Spanish Louisiana period. In 1793 Saint Louis Church was elevated to cathedral rank as the See of the Diocese of New Orleans, making it one of the oldest cathedrals in the United States. In 1819, a central tower (designed by Benjamin Henry Latrobe) with a clock and bell were added. The bell was embossed with the name "Victoire" in commemoration of the Battle of New Orleans victory in 1815.

Interior of the cathedral

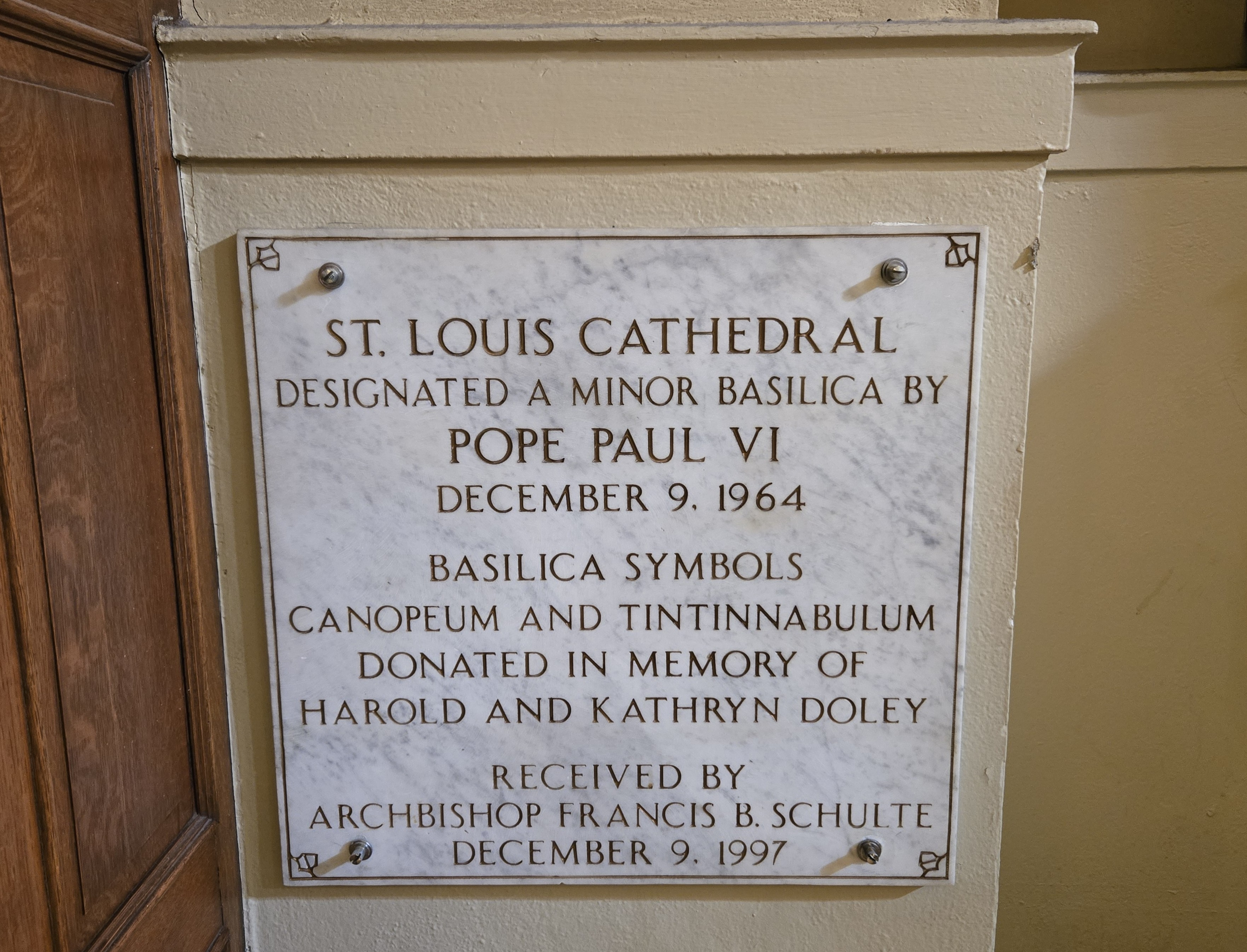
St. Louis Cathedral Minor Basilica Designation Plaque

Enlarging the building to meet the needs of the growing congregation had been pondered since 1834, and Jacques Nicolas Bussière de Pouilly was consulted to design plans for a new building. De Pouilly also designed St. Augustine Church in Tremé, the first church building dedicated as a parish church outside the French Quarter. (The Mortuary Chapel on North Rampart had been dedicated in 1827 as a chapel, and St. Vincent de Paul was established in a little frame church in 1838 but not dedicated.) On March 12, 1849, the diocese contracted with John Patrick Kirwan to enlarge and restore the cathedral, using De Pouilly's plans.

These specified that everything be demolished except the lateral walls and the lower portions of the existing towers on the front facade. During the reconstruction, it was determined that the sidewalls would have to be demolished also. During construction in 1850, the central tower collapsed. De Pouilly and Kirwan were replaced. As a consequence of these problems and reconstruction, very little of the Spanish Colonial structure survived. The present structure dates primarily to 1850. The bell from the 1819 tower was reused in the new building and is still there today. During the renovation, St. Patrick's Church served as the pro-cathedral for the city.

=== Bombing ===
On April 25, 1909, a dynamite bomb was set off in the cathedral, blowing out windows and damaging galleries. The following year a portion of the foundation collapsed, necessitating the building's closure while repairs were made, from Easter 1916 to Easter 1917.

=== Language switch ===
A 1906 church census reported that services at the cathedral were offered in both English and French (as it was prior to the Second Vatican Council, a significant portion of the service would have been conducted in Latin, but not all of it). The language of the sacramental register of the cathedral switched from French to English in 1910. By the early 1920s, it was reported that 95% of the parishioners understood English, although it is not clear when French-language services were last routinely held.

=== Papal visits ===
The cathedral was designated as a minor basilica by Pope Paul VI in 1964. Pope John Paul II visited the cathedral in September 1987.

=== Hurricane Katrina ===
In 2005, the high winds of Hurricane Katrina displaced two large [ sycamore ] trees in St. Anthony's Garden behind the cathedral, dislodging 30 feet (9.1 m) of the ornamental gate. The nearby marble statue of Jesus Christ was damaged, losing a forefinger and a thumb.

The winds tore a hole in the roof, allowing water to enter the building and severely damage its new Holtkamp pipe organ. Shortly after the storm, the organ was sent back to Holtkamp to be rebuilt. An electronic substitute was used until June 2008, when the organ was reinstalled in the cathedral. Originally installed during the cathedral's extensive renovation in 2004, the organ was donated by longtime choirmaster and organist Elise Cambon.

=== Bankruptcy ===
In November 2025, the Archdiocese of New Orleans placed over 150 parishes and charities in Chapter 11 bankruptcy protection as part of a settlement plan to resolve hundreds of sex abuse lawsuits. This wave of bankruptcies included this church.

== Gallery ==
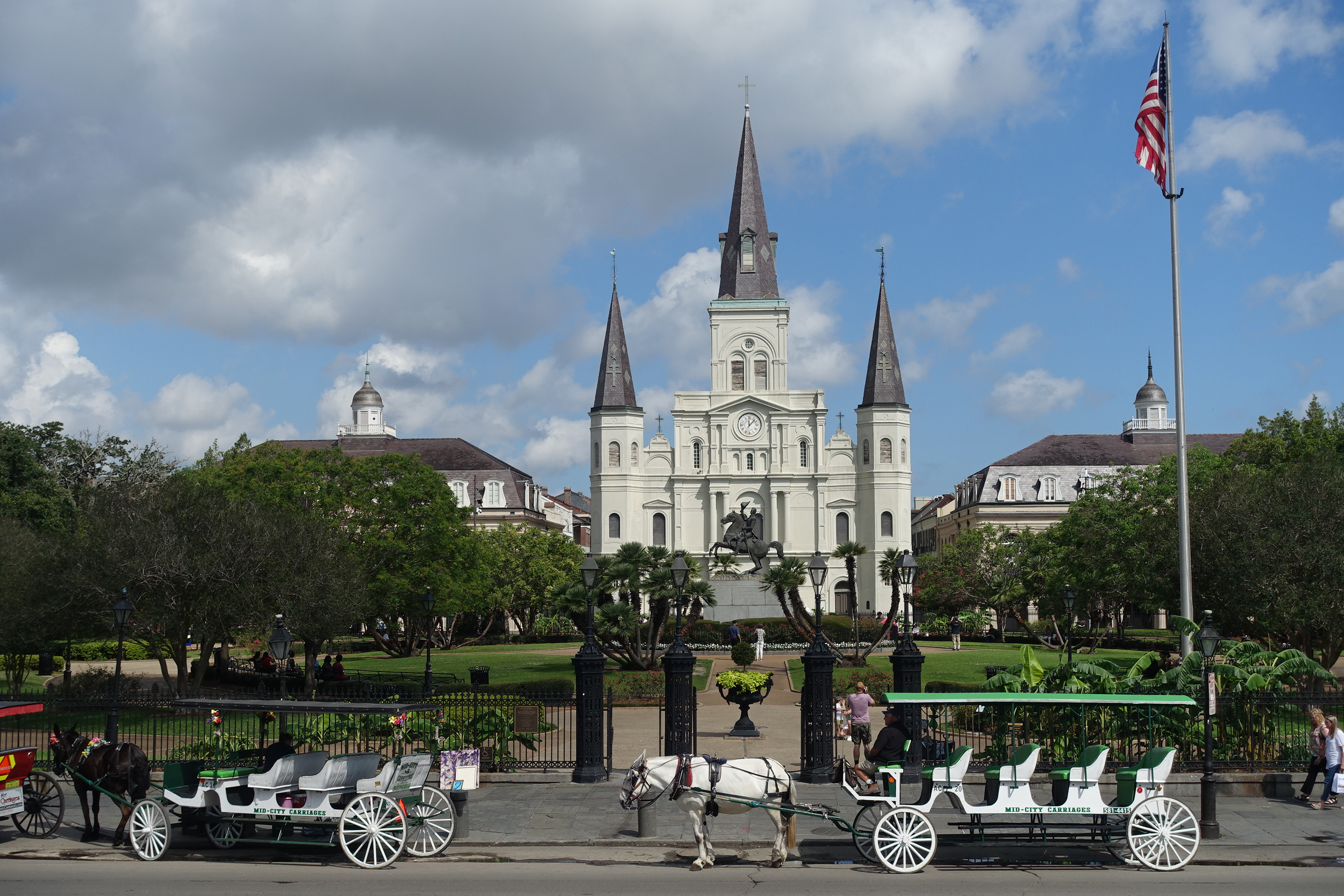
St. Louis Cathedral

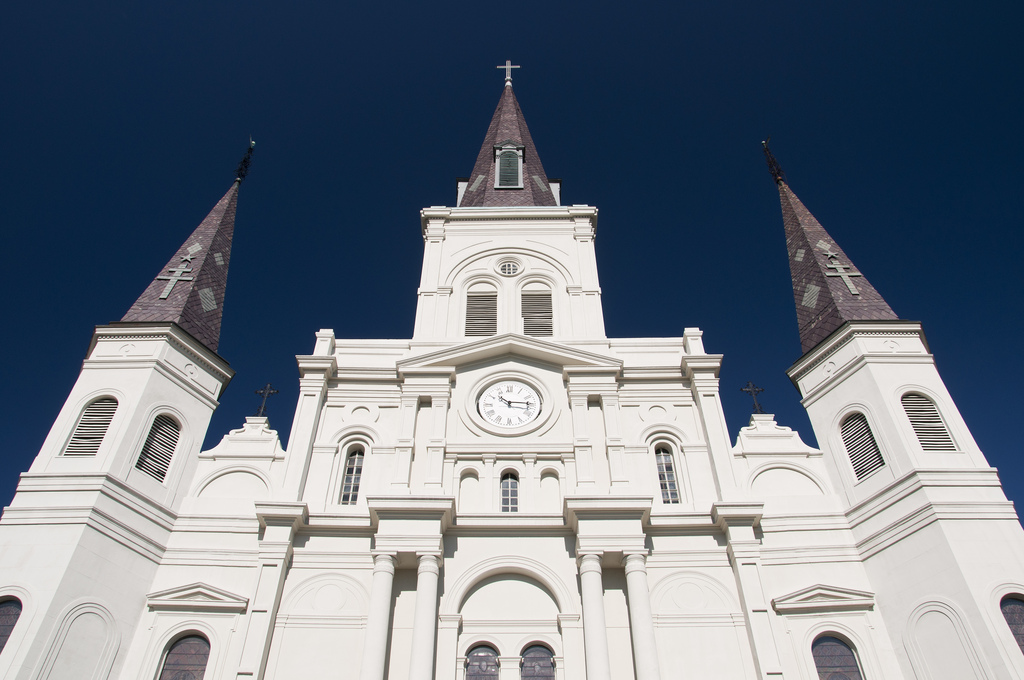
St. Louis Cathedral Spires

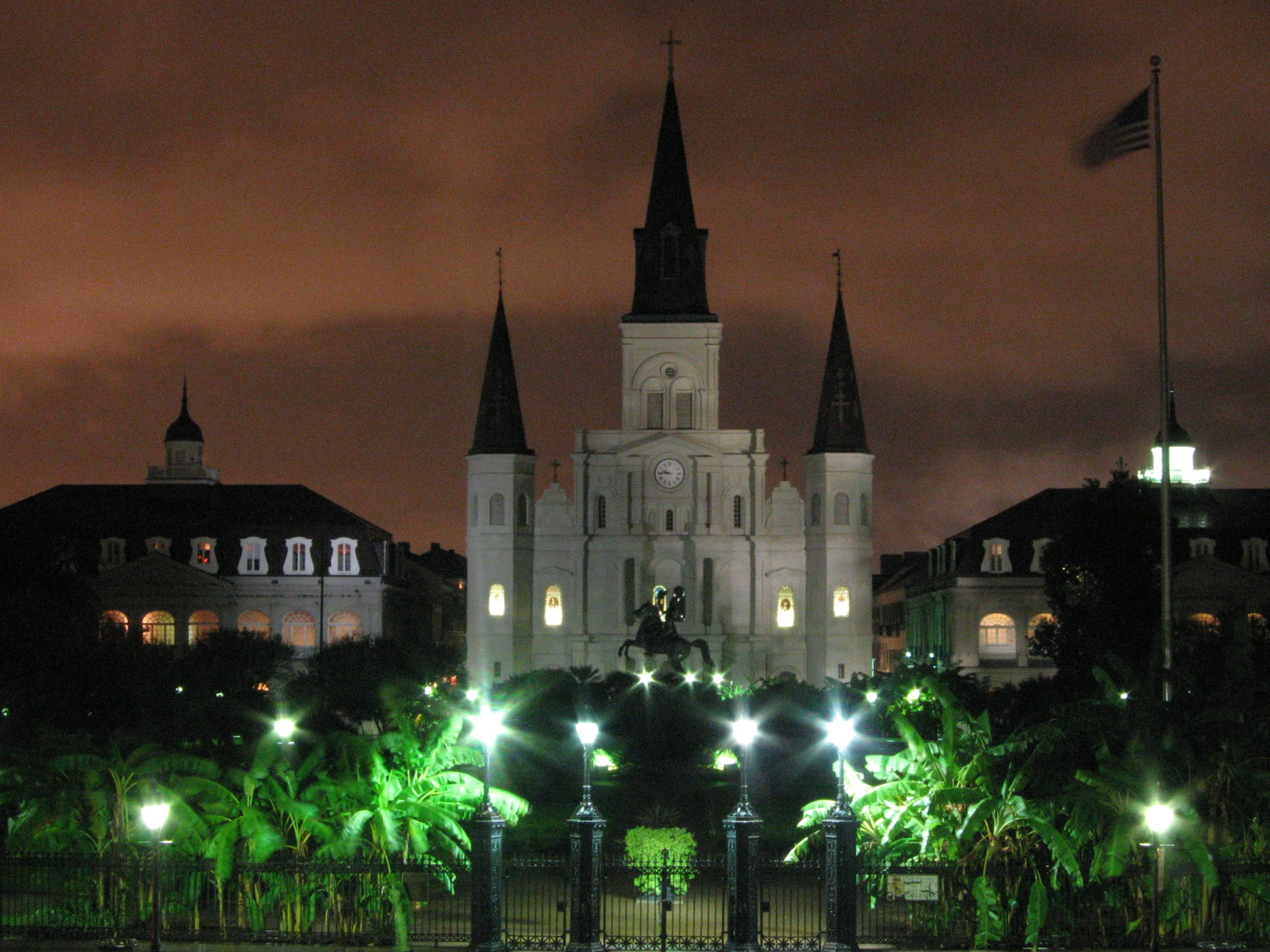
St. Louis Cathedral at Night

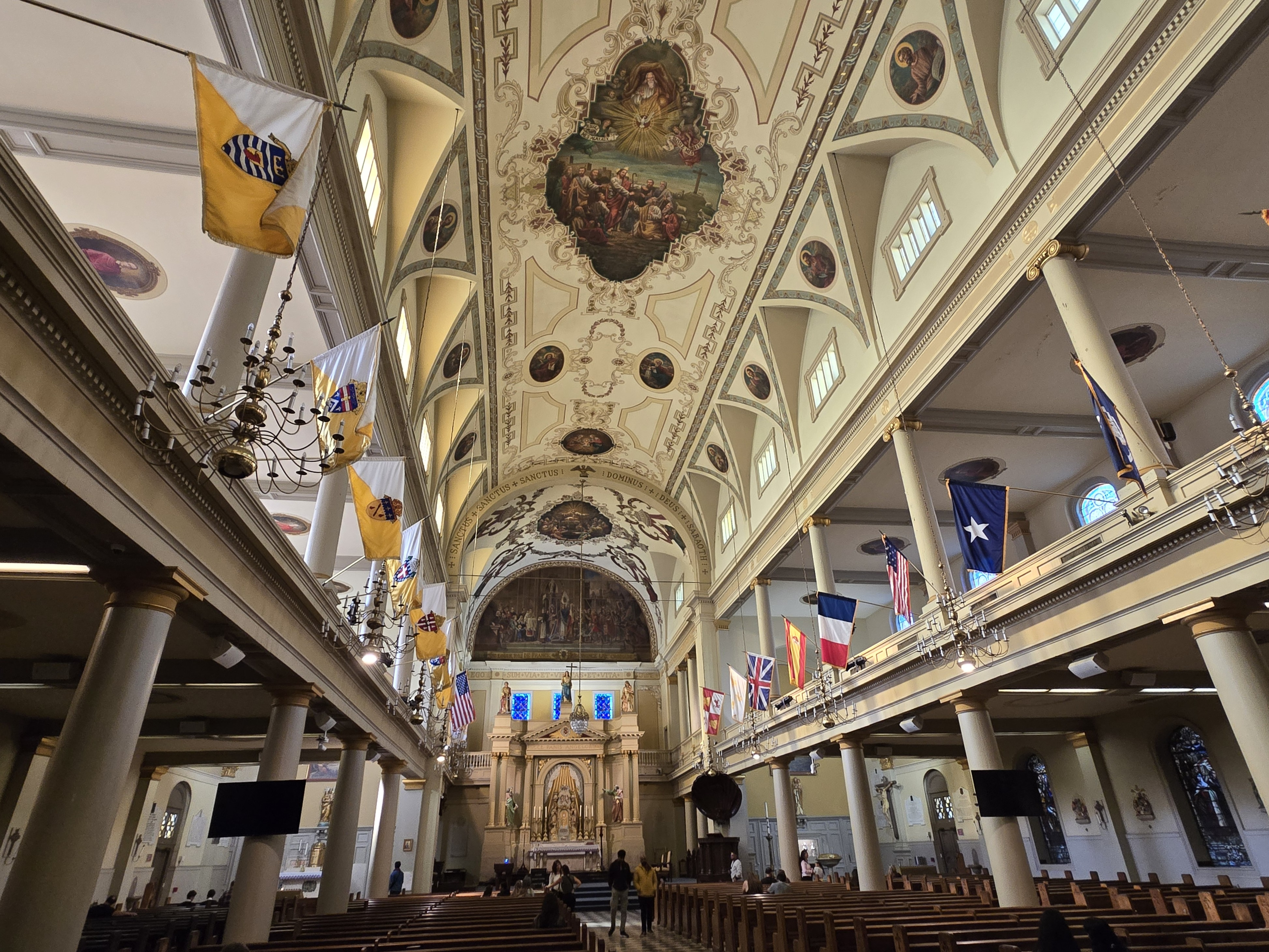
St. Louis Cathedral Nave, Sanctuary and Galleries

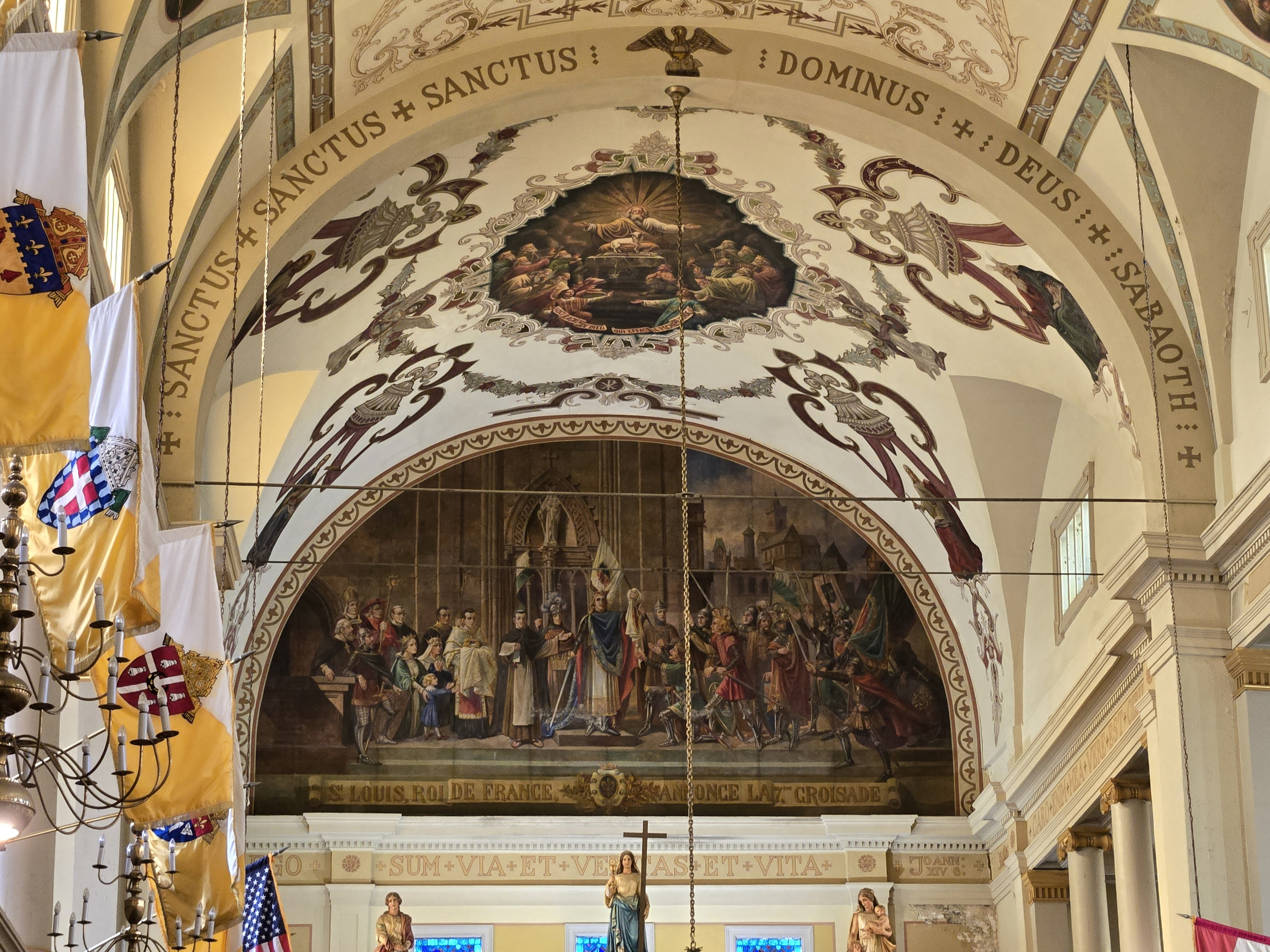
St. Louis Cathedral Frescos

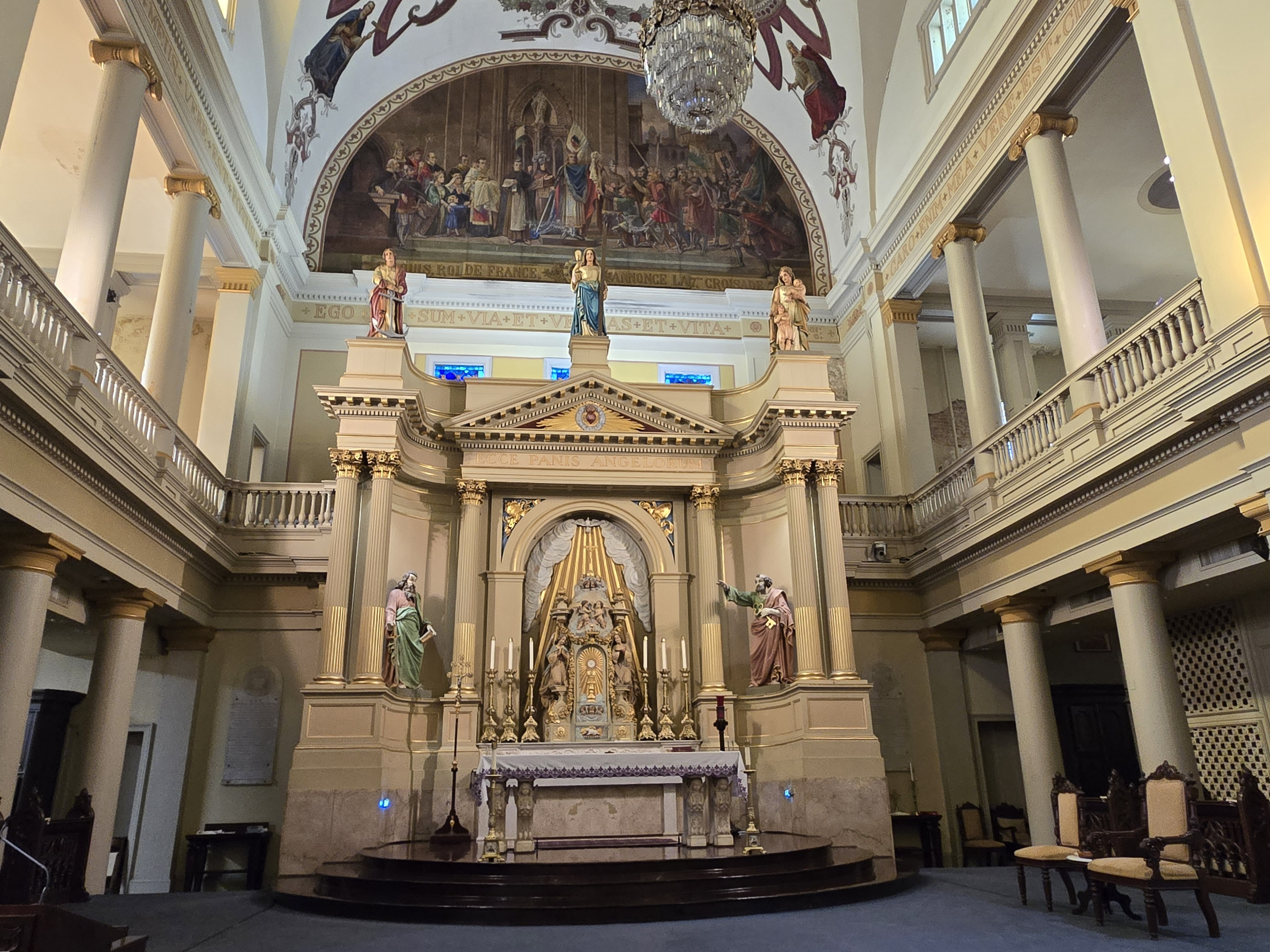
St. Louis Cathedral Sanctuary

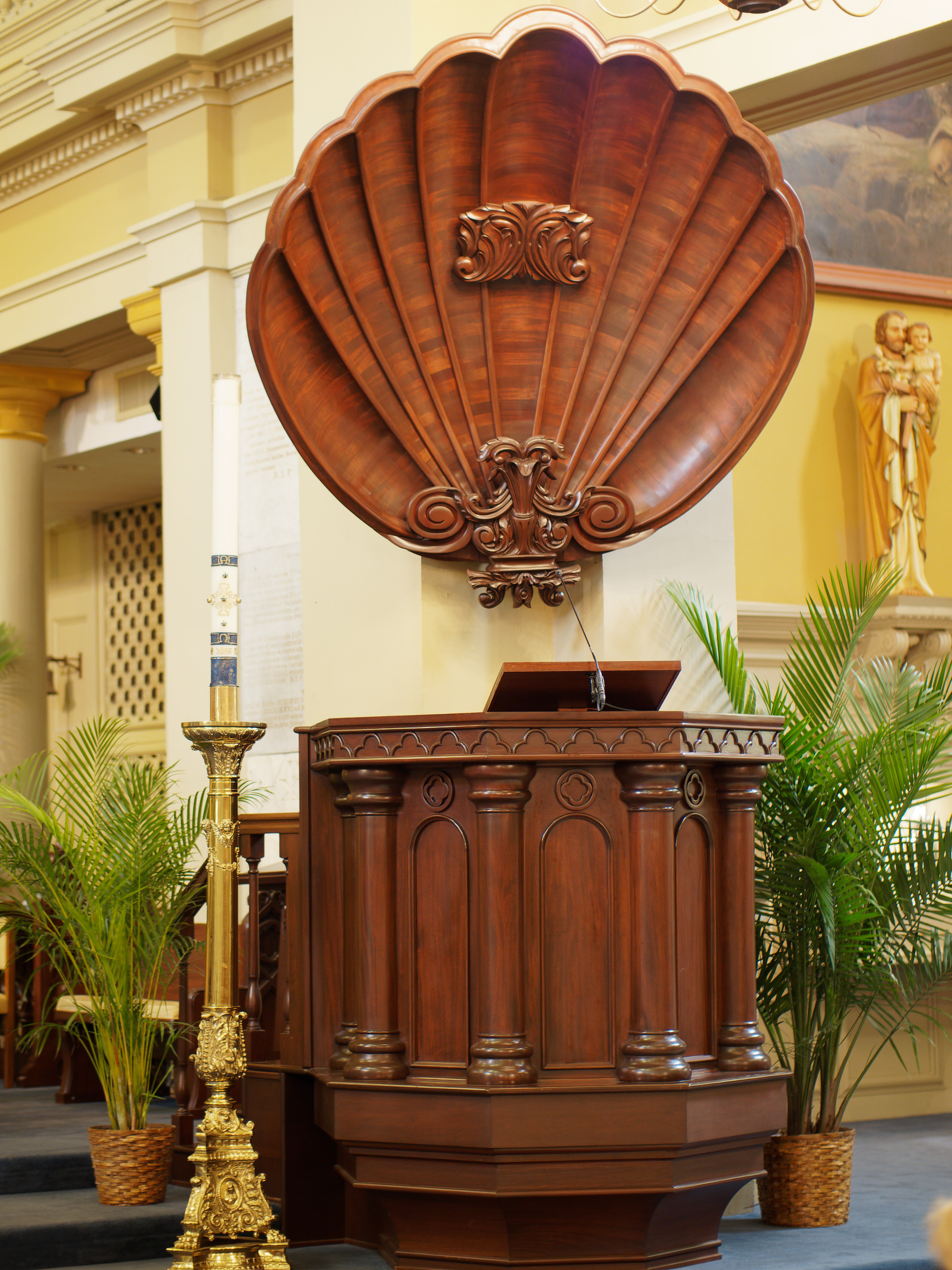
St. Louis Cathedral Pulpit

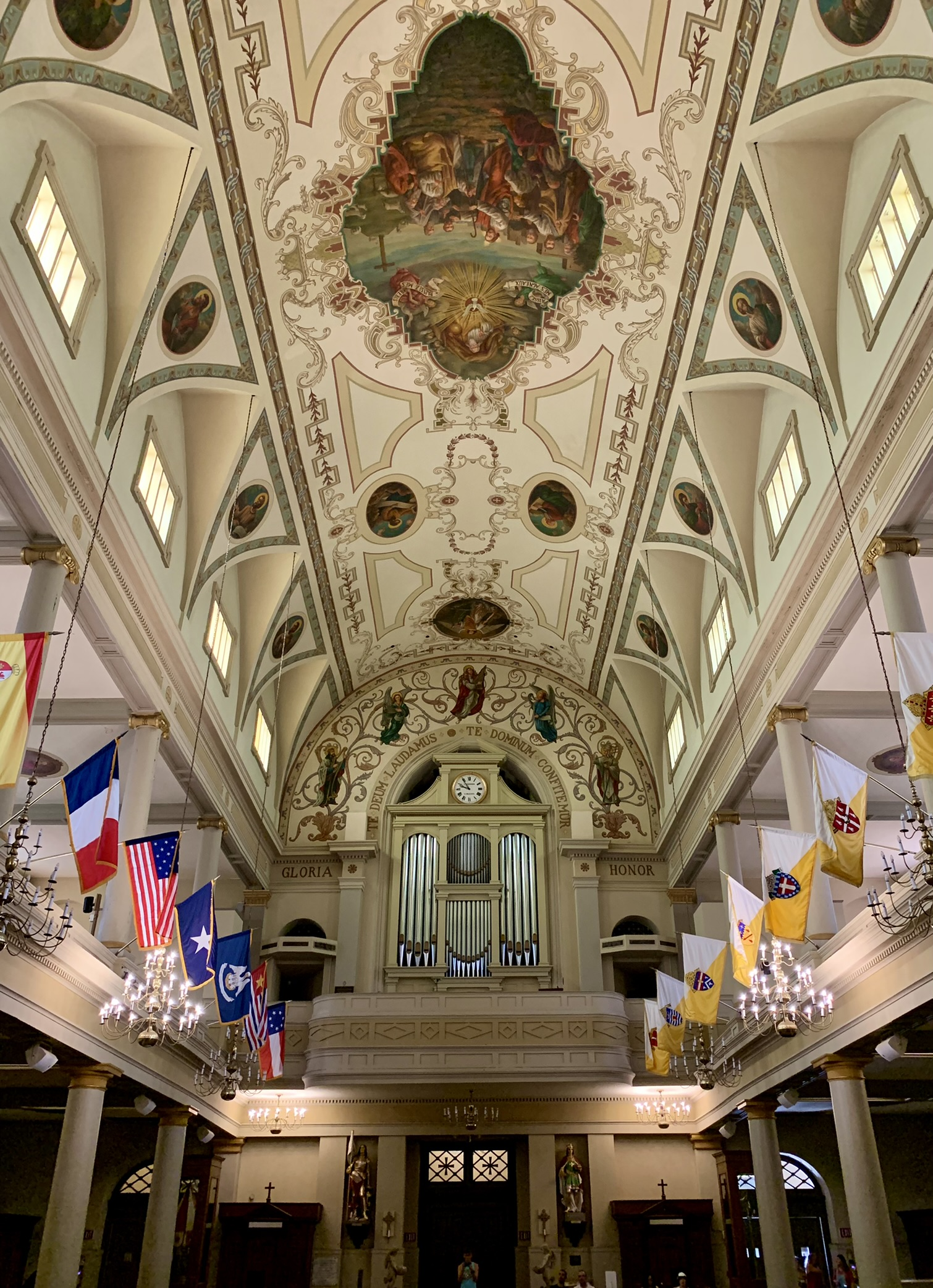
St. Louis Cathedral, Rear of Cathedral Interior

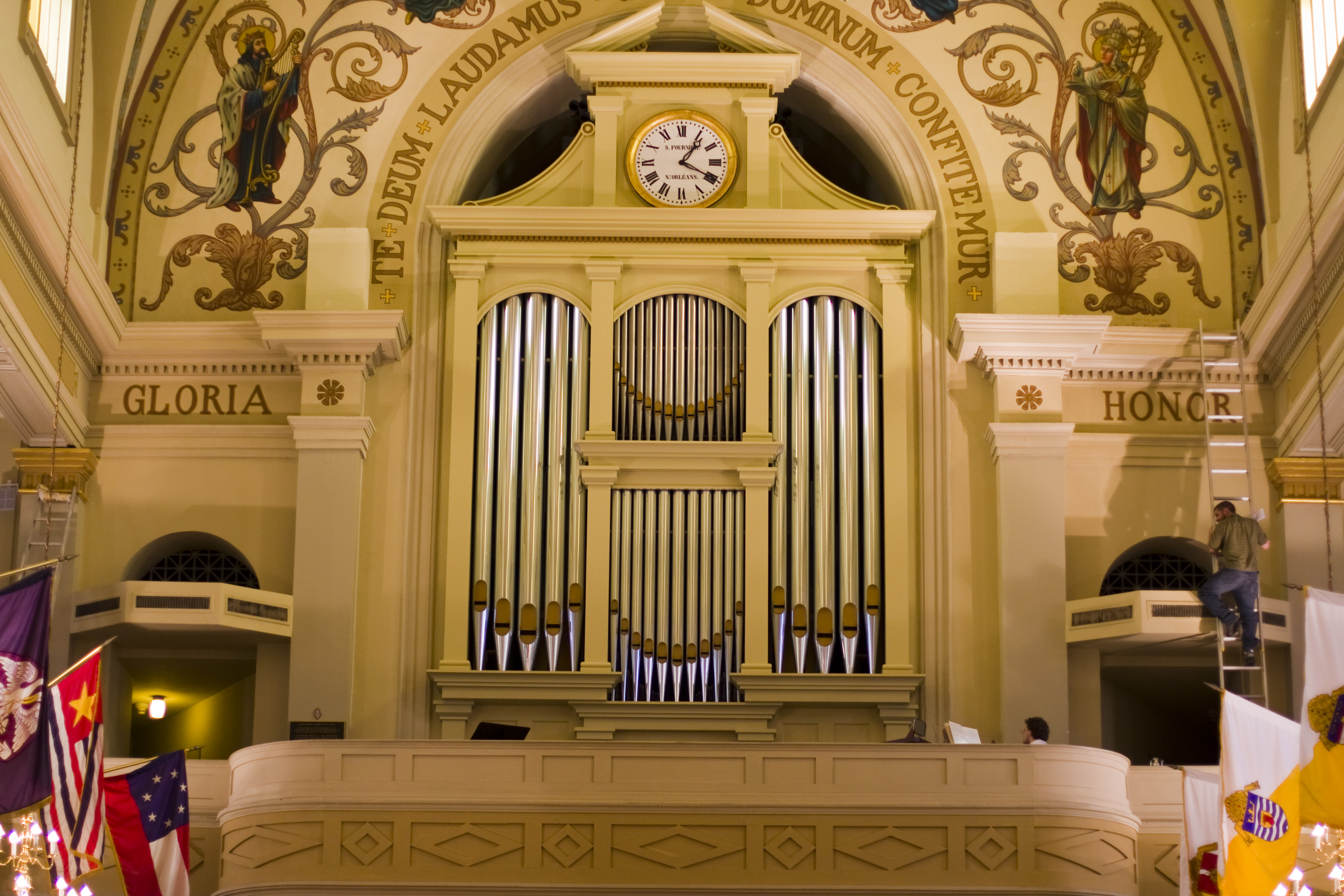
St. Louis Cathedral Pipe Organ

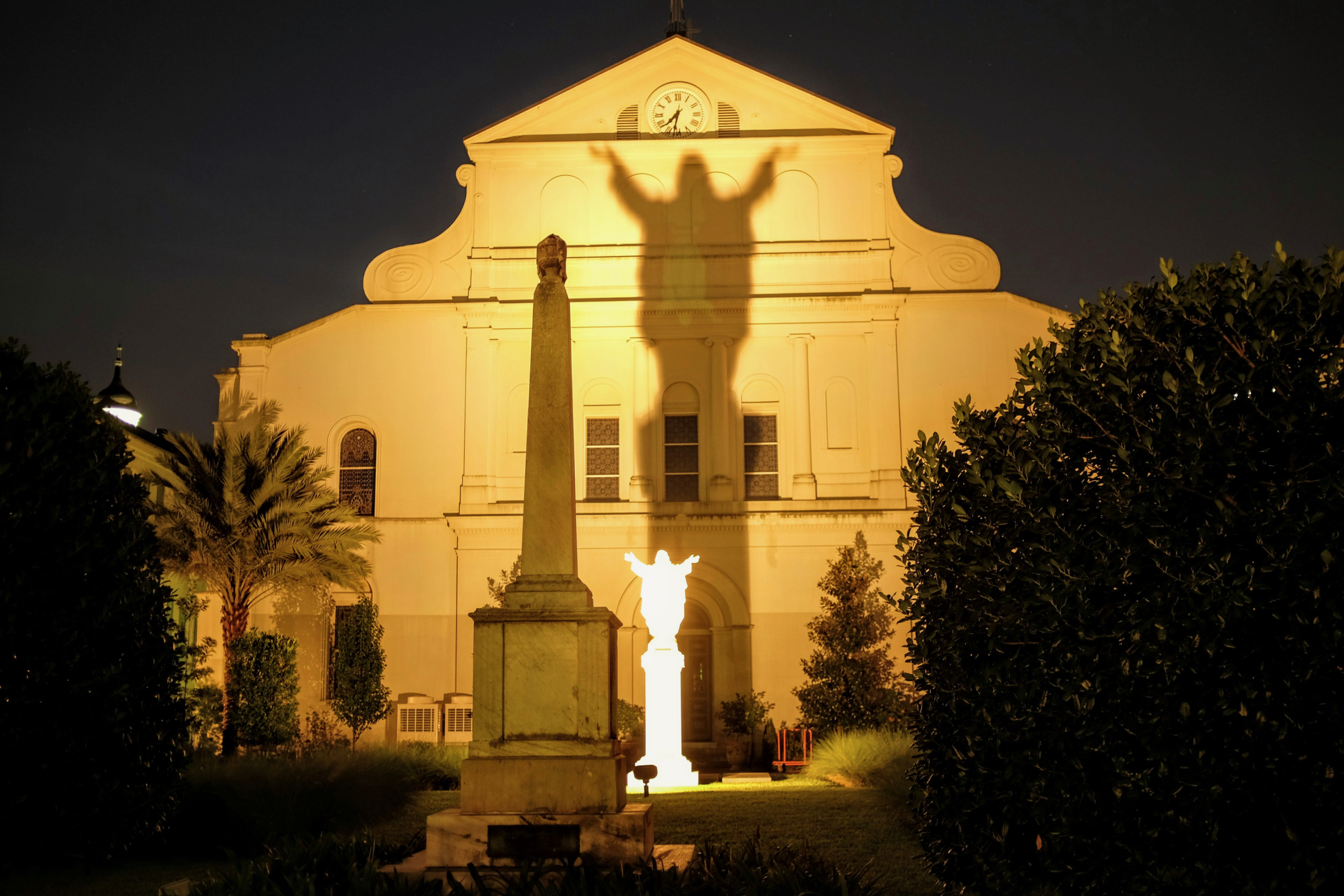
St. Louis Cathedral, View of the Rear Façade of the Cathedral

== See also ==
- List of Catholic cathedrals in the United States
- Oldest churches in the United States
