= Hug (surname) =

Hug is a German surname. Notable people with the surname include:

- Alexander Hug (ski mountaineer) (born 1975), Swiss ski mountaineer
- Alexander Hug (rugby player) (born 1984), German rugby union player
- Alfons Hug (born 1950), German curator
- Andy Hug (1964-2000), Swiss kickboxer
- Christian Hug (born 1982), German rugby union player
- Christine Hug (1981-2023), Swiss military officer
- Gary Hug, American astronomer
- Johann Leonhard Hug (1765-1846), German theologian
- Maja Hug (born 1928), Swiss figure skater
- Marcel Hug (born 1986), Swiss wheelchair athlete
- Reto Hug (born 1975), Swiss triathlete
- Tim Hug (born 1987), Swiss skier
- Werner Hug (born 1952), Swiss chess player
