= Cuddle (disambiguation) =

A cuddle or hug is a near universal form of physical intimacy.

Cuddle may also refer to:

- Cuddle (EP), extended play by Stikky
- Cuddle (horse), New Zealand Thoroughbred racemare

== See also ==
- Cuddles (disambiguation)
