= Lowell C. Smith =

American College professor

- Born: Lowell Cyrus Smith; March 17, 1931; Cleveland, Ohio, United States
- Died: August 25, 2016 (aged 85); Clanton, Alabama, United States
- Education: Kent State University; George Washington University; University of Alabama
- Occupations: Professor; Academic administrator
- Political party: Republican
- Spouses: Eleanor Mann; Dorothy Drake; Annella Trobaugh
- Children: 3

Lowell Cyrus Smith (March 17, 1931 - August 25, 2016) was an American professor and academic administrator, who served as the fourth president of Nichols College from 1978 to 1996. Smith concurrently served as president of Worcester Junior College from 1988 to 1989.

== Career ==
Born to Cyrus Smith and Ruth Hildebrand, Smith was as a naval aviator in the United States Navy, where he rose to the rank of Captain and served for nearly twenty years. He also served as a director at Amica Mutual Insurance for twenty-two years.

Smith obtained his Bachelor of Science in Business Administration from Kent State University, and then received his Master of Business Administration from George Washington University. Finally, he received his Doctor of Business Administration from the University of Alabama in 1970. Smith's dissertation was titled "An Evaluation of Public Policy Proposals for the Regulation of Private Pension Plan Eligibility Requirements and Vesting Provisions."

Smith held academic positions at a number of institutions, including Loyola University New Orleans as Dean of the College of Business Administration and Bryant College as Vice President for Academic Affairs. He also had a stint at George Washington University as Assistant Professor of Business Administration and oversaw the school's academic programs at Maxwell Air Force Base in Alabama.

On March 4, 1978, Smith was named Professor of Business Administration and President of Nichols College, and became the fourth to hold that position in school history. He began his tenure at Nichols on April 1, succeeding Darcy C. Coyle. Smith would remain in the post until 1996, while holding a concurrent role as president of Worcester Junior College from 1988 to 1989. In 1980, he also helped to establish Nichols' local chapter of the Alpha Phi Sigma honor society for criminal justice programs, and create the Institute for American Values, later renamed the Robert C. Fischer Policy and Cultural Institute, a space for students to think critically about contemporary world issues. He was named the commencement speaker four times for the graduating classes of 1978, 1982, 1984, and 1996.

Upon retirement, Smith was given the title of Professor and President Emeritus of Nichols College, and given an honorary degree of Doctor of Science in Business Administration. He was also the recipient of an honorary Doctor of Humane Letters degree from Nathaniel Hawthorne College.

Smith was a member of a number of intellectual societies, including Beta Gamma Sigma, the Blue Key Honor Society, the Mont Pelerin Society, and the Philadelphia Society. A Republican, Smith was also part of the Council for National Policy and The Heritage Foundation.

An Episcopalian, Smith died in 2016 in Clanton.

== See also ==
- List of Kent State University alumni
- List of The George Washington School of Business people
- List of University of Alabama people
- List of Loyola University New Orleans people
