= Robert D. Wetmore =

American politician

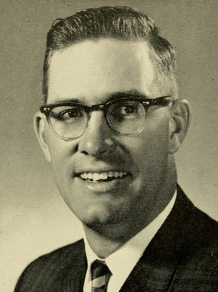
- Wetmore in 1967.

Member of the Massachusetts Senate from the Worcester, Hampden, Hampshire, and Middlesex District
- In office 1976–1996
- Succeeded by: Stephen Brewer

Member of the Massachusetts House of Representatives from the 2nd Worcester District
- In office 1964–1977
- Preceded by: J. Philip Howard
- Succeeded by: Chester Suhoski

Personal details
- Born: Robert Delvey Wetmore, Sr. July 24, 1930 Gardner, Massachusetts, United States
- Died: January 15, 2016 (aged 85) Massachusetts, United States
- Party: Democratic
- Spouse(s): Jean Valley (m. 1957); Andrea Flajole
- Children: 4
- Education: Worcester Junior College; Clark University; College of the Holy Cross; New England Law Boston

Robert Delvey Wetmore, Sr. (July 24, 1930 – January 15, 2016) was an American politician from Massachusetts.

== Biography ==
Born to Elmer Marshall and Marion Ray Parmenter, Wetmore was a graduate of Gardner High School. He then went on to receive degrees from Worcester Junior College, Clark University, College of the Holy Cross in Industrial Relations, and New England Law Boston. In 1952, Wetmore was drafted to serve in the Korean War, and later joined the Veterans of Foreign Wars. Early in his career, he spent time as a lineworker.

Wetmore served in the Massachusetts House of Representatives for the 2nd Worcester District from 1964 to 1976, and then in the Massachusetts Senate for the Worcester, Hampden, Hampshire, and Middlesex District from 1976 to 1997. While in the Senate, he served on the Committee on Commerce and Labor and the Senate Ways and Means Committee. From 1980 to 1988, his successor in the Senate, Stephen Brewer, was his aide. Wetmore is known for his legislation work to preserve the Quabbin Reservoir and Ware River, as well as advocacy for Article 97 of the Constitution of Massachusetts.

Wetmore stayed in a rent-controlled apartment in Cambridge when the legislature was in session. Because it was rent controlled, he could not be evicted so that someone who wanted the apartment full time could have it.

In 2004, the Mount Wachusett Community College dedicated a new building as the Robert D. Wetmore Center for Innovation in Design, Technology and Resource Development.

== Personal life ==
Prior to his death, caused by Parkinson's disease, in 2016, Wetmore lived on Hubbardston Road in Barre, Massachusetts. He was also a member of the American Legion and the Lions Clubs International.
