= Alfons Hug =

German curator, art critic and exhibition organizer

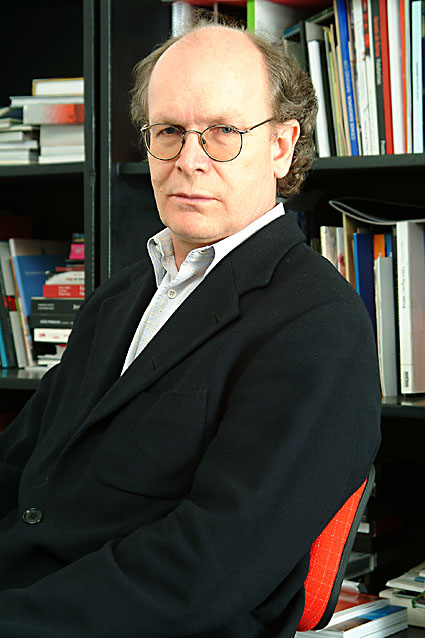
- Born: 16 March 1950 (age 76); Hochdorf, West Germany

Alfons Hug (born 16 March 1950 in Hochdorf, West Germany) is a curator, critic and exhibition organizer.

Hug studied linguistics, comparative literature and cultural studies in Freiburg, Berlin, Dublin and Moscow. He curated the XXV and XXVI São Paulo Art Biennial in 2002 and 2004. Hug was the first non-Brazilian to curate this art event.

Since the mid-1980s Hug worked as director of Goethe-Institutes (German Cultural Centres) in Lagos, Medellín, Brasília, Caracas and Moscow. From 2002 to 2015 he occupied this position at the Goethe-Institute in Rio de Janeiro and from July 2015 to February 2016 in Singapore. From June 2016 until June 2017 he was again director of the Goethe-Institute in Lagos, Nigeria, and from 2017 to 2023 founding director of the Goethe-Zentrum in Baku, Azerbaijan.

From 1994 to 1998 Hug headed the Visual Arts Department at the House of World Cultures, Berlin.

== Work as curator (Biennials) ==
- 2002: Chief Curator, 25th Bienal de São Paulo, Brazil (670,000 visitors)
- 2003: Co-curator, 4th Bienal do Mercosul, Porto Alegre, Brazil
- 2003: Curator of Brazilian Pavilion, Venice Biennial
- 2003: Organizer of "Old Art from Africa", Centro Cultural Banco do Brasil, Rio de Janeiro (750,000 visitors)
- 2004: Chief Curator, 26th Bienal de São Paulo, Brazil (917,000 visitors)
- 2004: Curator of Brazilian Representation, Bienal de Cuenca, Ecuador
- 2005: Curator of Brazilian Representation, New Delhi Triennial
- 2005: Curator of Brazilian Pavilion, Venice Biennial
- 2009: Curator of the Bienal del Fin del Mundo, Ushuaia, Tierra del Fuego, Argentina
- 2011: Curator of the Bienal de Curitiba, Brazil
- 2011: Curator of the Latin American Pavilion, IILA, Venice Biennial
- 2012: Curator of the 1st. Bienal of Montevideo, Uruguay
- 2012: Curator of the "BRICS"-project, Kochi Biennial, India
- 2013: Curator Proyecto "Trapananda", Aysén, Chile
- 2013: Curator of the Latin American Pavilion, IILA, Venice Biennial
- 2014: Curator of the 2nd. Bienal of Montevideo, Uruguay
- 2015: Curator of the Latin American Pavilion, IILA, Venice Biennial
- 2016: Curator of the 3rd Bienal de Montevideo, Uruguay
- 2018: Curator of the 11th Bienal do Mercosul, Porto Alegre, Brazil
- 2019: Curator of the 4th Bienal de Montevideo
- 2020: Curator "Invisible Biennale" (online)
- 2023: Curator of the 5th Bienal de Montevideo
- 2025: Curator of the 6th Bienal de Montevideo

Curated also:

- 1992-93 : Arte Amazonas, Museu de Arte Moderna (Rio de Janeiro), Museu de Arte, (Brasília), Kunsthalle Berlin, Ludwig Forum, Aachen
- 1984-87: 10 individual and group shows of Nigerian artists in Lagos
- 1994: Revendo Brasília, Galeria Athos Bulcão (Brasília), Museu de Imagem e Som (São Paulo), Palácio Gustavo Capanema (Rio de Janeiro), Museu Metropolitano de Arte (Curitiba)
- 1994: Soundscape Brasília, various venues in Brasília
- Contemporary African Art (Berlin)
- Die Rote Burg – Art from Spain and North Africa (Berlin)
- 1995: Havanna/São Paulo- Contemporary Art from Latin America (Berlin)
- 1996: Colours – South African Art (Berlin)
- 1997: Die anderen Modernen (25 Artists from Latin America, Asia and Africa), (Berlin)
- 1997: Painting from China (organizer), Berlin
- 1998: Biennale de Dakar, co-curator, Contemp. Korean Art, (Berlin)
- 1999: El Retorno de Humboldt (Caracas)
- 1999: Internetproject with ZKM (Karlsruhe): Philip Pocock, Roberto Cabot, W. Staehle
- 2000: "90x60x90-El síndrome de la Miss", Museo Jacobo Borges, Caracas
- 2004: "Carnaval", Centro Cultural Banco do Brasil, Rio de Janeiro
- 2005: "Alegoria barroca na arte contemporânea", CCBB, Rio de Janeiro
- 2006: Neue brasilianische Fotokunst, Neuer Berliner Kunstverein
- 2006: "Fußball: Zeichnung auf grünem Grund", CCBB Rio de Janeiro
- 2007: "Arte da China", CCBB Rio de Janeiro
- 2007: "Relíquias e Ruinas", Oi Futuro, Rio de Janeiro
- 2007-2009: "The Tropics", CCBB Brasília, CCBB Rio de Janeiro, Martin-Gropius-Bau (Berlin), National Gallery (Cape Town), Jim Thompson Art Center (Bangkok)
- 2009-2010: "Intemperie", Ushuaia, Punta Arenas, Rosario, Montevideo, Porto Alegre, Curitiba, São Paulo, Rio de Janeiro, New York, Boston, Quito, Toulouse, Kiel, Berlin, Hong Kong, Manila
- 2009: "Arte da Antártida", Oi Futuro, Rio de Janeiro
- 2010-2011: "Menos Tiempo que Lugar": Buenos Aires, Córdoba, Salta, Quito, Santiago, Curitiba, Porto Alegre, Rio de Janeiro, Belo Horizonte, Medellín, La Paz, Santa Cruz de la Sierra, Lima, Guadalajara
- 2012: "High Tech-low tech": Oi Futuro, Rio de Janeiro and Belo Horizonte
- 2013: O jogo só acaba quando termina - art and football (Buenos Aires, Montevideo, Brasilia, Salvador, Rio de Janeiro, São Paulo, Santiago de Chile, La Paz, Lima, Caracas, Nürnberg, Wiesbaden, Frankfurt, Berlin)
- 2013: "Miradas insobornables", Buenos Aires
- 2013: El Aleph (Anthony Mc Call and Mischa Kuball), Faena Arts Center, Buenos Aires
- 2014: BRICS, Oi Futuro, Rio de Janeiro (Art from Brazil, India, China, South Africa, Russia)
- 2015-16: O papagaio de Humboldt-Indigenous voices, Oi Futuro, Rio de Janeiro, Oca (São Paulo), Bienal de Curitiba, Bienal de Asuncion, Bienal de Nuevos Medios, Santiago, HAU 2 (Berlin), Hellerau Dresden, Ramallah
- 2015: Zeitgeist Berlin, CCBB Rio de Janeiro, Belo Horizonte and Brasilia
- 2016: Club Berlin, Deck Artspace, Singapore
- 2016: Jogos do Sul, Centro Helio Oiticica, Rio de Janeiro
- 2016: The Kula Ring, Galerie Eigenheim Weimar + Theatre Works, Singapore
- 2017: Hotspot Lagos
- 2017: Vanishing Voices, sound installation of Nigerian languages, Lagos
- 2017: The Atlantic Triangle, Lagos, Nigeria as well as Saracura art space in Rio de Janeiro
- 2017-18: Ex Africa, Centro Cultural Banco do Brasil (Belo Horizonte, Rio de Janeiro, Brasilia, São Paulo)
- 2018: Géricault's shipwreck, Kapellhaus Baku
- 2019: A Doll's House, Kapellhaus Baku
- 2019: The Theft of Fire, Kapellhaus Baku
- 2021: Haft Paykar, Kapellhaus Baku
- 2021: Oriental Heritage, Hamam in Icherisheher, Baku
- 2022: "SILK", Giudecca Art District, Venice
- 2022 Essad Bey's Ordeal, Shirwanshah Palace, Baku
- 2022/23 The Fog of War, Baku, Tbilisi, Almaty
- 2023 A Hunger Artist, Kapellhaus Baku
- 2023 Studio Drift, Centro Cultural Banco do Brasil, Rio de Janeiro, São Paulo, Belo Horizonte, Brasilia
- 2025. "Africa", Yarat Art Centre, Baku
