= Nancy Davis (businesswoman) =

American businesswoman

- Born: c. 1977
- Education: George Washington University
- Occupations: Chief investment officer, entrepreneur, businessperson
- Organization(s): Founder and Managing Partner of Quadratic Capital Management

Nancy Davis (born c. 1977) is an American entrepreneur who founded and is as chief investment officer and managing partner of Quadratic Capital Management.

== Life ==
Davis was born c. 1977. She grew up in Tampa, Florida, and obtained a B.A. in economics from George Washington University.

After graduating, she began her career at Goldman Sachs where she spent more than ten years, the last seven with the proprietary trading group where she rose to the Head of Credit, Derivatives and OTC Trading. She is a portfolio manager at Highbridge Capital Management and also took a senior executive role at AllianceBernstein.

She is the founder, Chief investment officer, and managing partner of Quadratic Capital Management. The firm is based in Greenwich, Connecticut. Its IVOL fund was judged by ETF.com to be the best new fixed-income ETF of 2019.

Unfortunately, IVOL's performance suffered from rapidly rising interest rates and unfavorable derivatives positions in 2022-2024. According to Morningstar Inc., as of December 6, 2024, the fund had a five-year -3.33% annualized return, underperforming its category average by 5.0%, placing it in the 98th performance percentile, and earning a rare one-star Morningstar rating.
