= Elise Cambon =

American organist and pedagogue (1917–2007)

Elise Cambon (February 27, 1917 – December 30, 2007) was an organist and choir master on the staff of St. Louis Cathedral (New Orleans) for sixty-two years.

Cambon was born in New Orleans, received a Bachelor of Arts from Newcomb College in 1939, a Master of Music in Organ from the University of Michigan in 1947, and a PhD from Tulane University in 1975. As a Fulbright Scholar in 1953, she attended the Hochschule für Musik in Frankfurt-am-Main, and studied organ under Helmut Walcha, as well as harpsichord and conducting. She also studied at Syracuse University, Oberlin College, the Pius X School of Liturgical Music, and at the Abbey of Solesmes.

Cambon was, from 1961 to 1982, a professor at Loyola University New Orleans's College of Music, and the French government named her a Chevalier of the Ordre des Arts et des Lettres.

She donated the 2004 Holtkamp organ at St. Louis Cathedral, and left a substantial fortune at her death, which was distributed to the Cathedral, various schools with which she had been associated, and her servants. Following her death in New Orleans, a funeral at the Cathedral and burial in Metairie Cemetery, the Elise M Cambon Residuary Charitable Trust was founded in her native city.

Cambon was a dominating figure in Louisiana's music world during her long career.
