= Víctor J. Montilla =

Puerto Rican businessman

Víctor Montilla
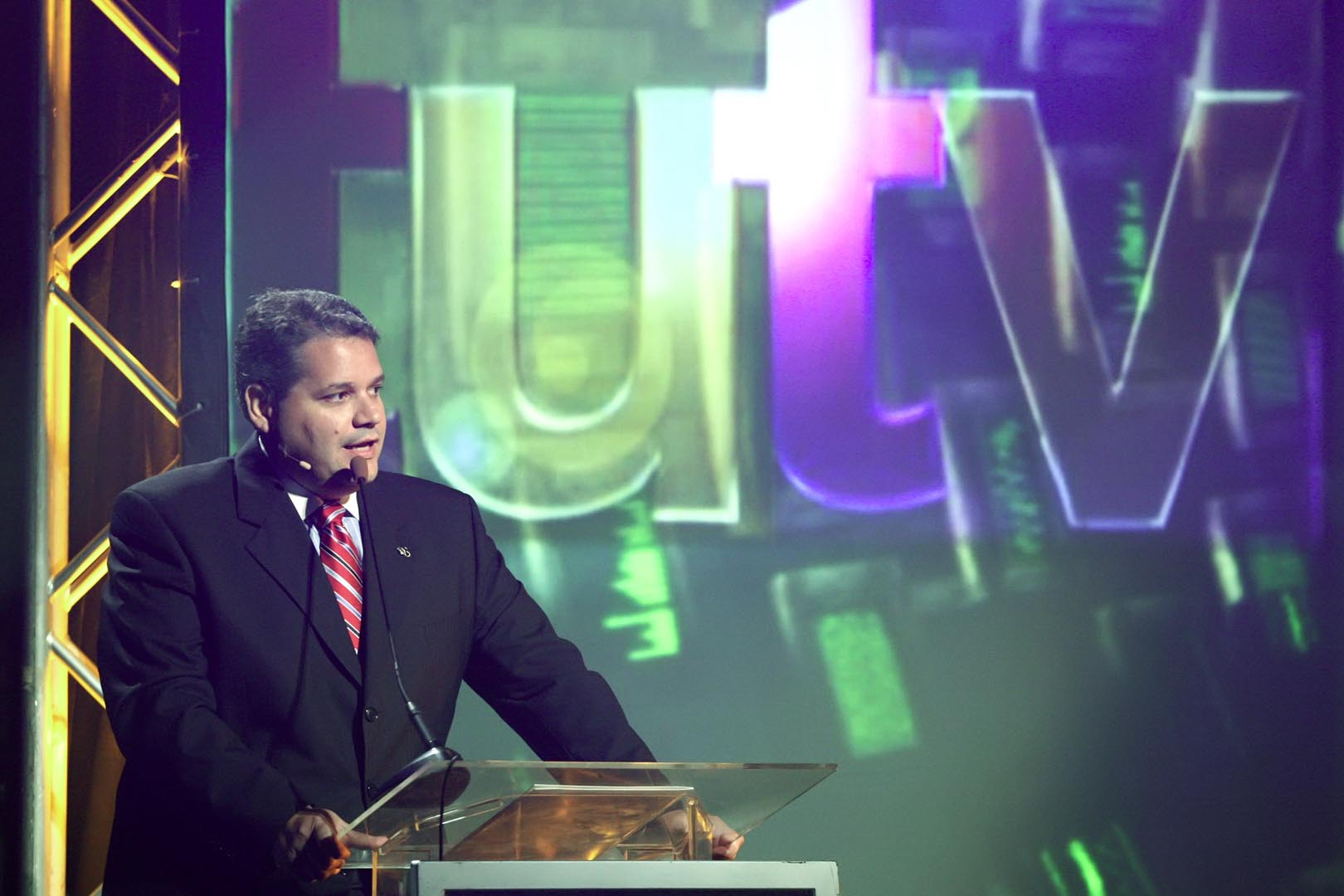
- Montilla in 2008
- Born: Víctor José Montilla; May 26, 1970; Santurce, Puerto Rico
- Other names: Montilla, Víctor J.; Montilla Torres, Víctor, Montilla, Víctor
- Education: B.A. (1992) Communications
- Alma mater: Loyola University New Orleans
- Title: President Olympusat International
- Children: 2

Víctor José Montilla (born May 26, 1970) is a Puerto Rican businessman, publishing senior executive, and broadcaster.

== Career overview ==
Born on May 26, 1970, Víctor Montilla Torres graduated from high school in 1998 from Colegio Maristas, in Guaynabo, Puerto Rico. Received a BA in Communication Arts from Loyola University New Orleans. In 1992, he began working at Cordero Teleproducciones, serving as general producer for a range of productions before in 2005 becoming President of the Puerto Rico Corporation for Public Broadcasting (CPB).

In 2010, he joined Casiano Communications Inc.'s leadership team as Executive Vice President for one of the largest Hispanic Publisher of Magazine and Periodicals in the United States, with over 11 Publications, digital media, marketing services and a full telemarketing operation that serves Puerto Rico and the US Mainland.

In 2013 he returned to broadcasting as Executive Vice President and General Manager of New Channels for Telecinco Inc., the owner and operator of WORA TV, Channel 5 and ABC Television Network affiliate, ABC5 and VIVE TV Network.

After successfully leading development, operations and the launch of two tv networks in Puerto Rico, Montilla joined Florida-based Olympusat, a content and technology provider as Content and General Manager for Puerto Rico operations. Since, he has taken the new role of President for Olympusat International, leading and developing operations of all businesses for Olympusat International including LATAM sales, content, channel and OTT platform distribution as well as co-production and strategic partnerships.

== Awards ==
- 2006 Governor's Award from the Board of Governors of the Suncoast Chapter of the National Academy of Television Arts and Sciences.
- 2007 Television Executive of the Year by AdNotas.com.
- 2015 Zenit Award, Communications Sector, Puerto Rico Chamber of Commerce
- 2016 Top Management Award - Media, Puerto Rico Sales and Marketing Executive Association
- 2017 Silver Circle Award, NATAS Suncoast Chapter
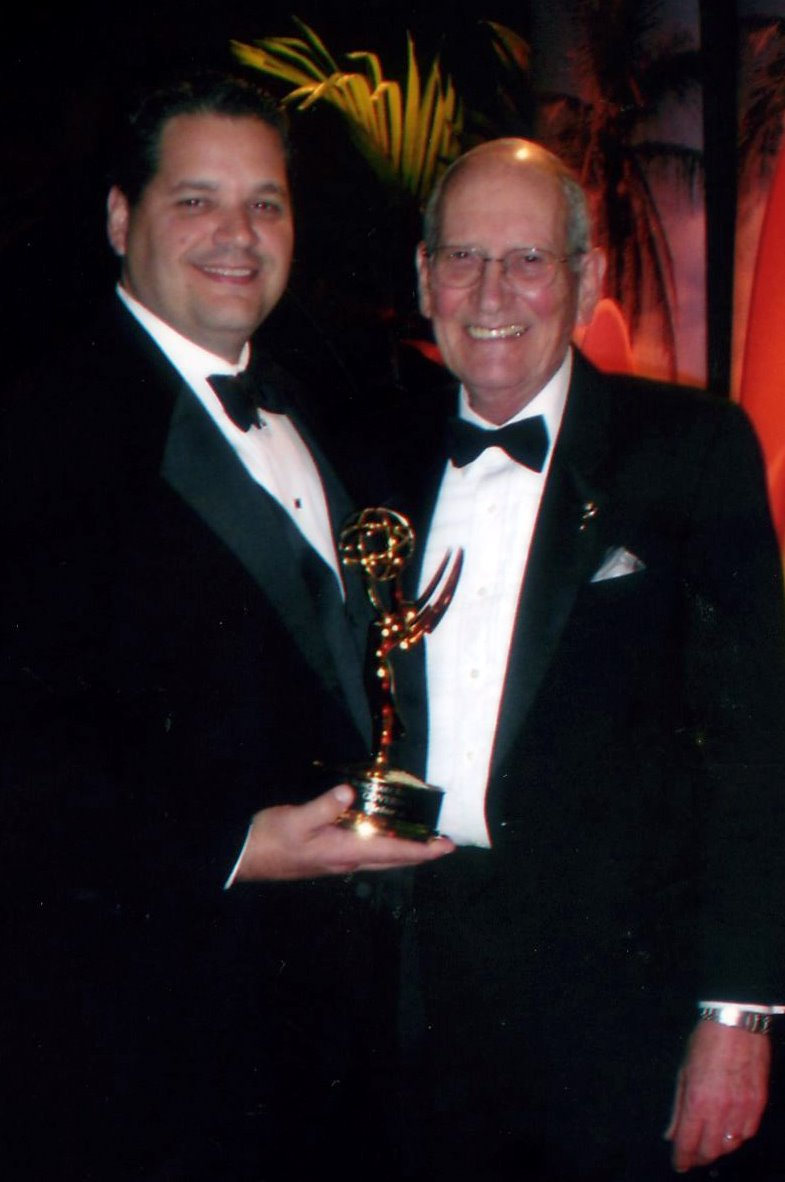
Montilla receives award from Bob Behrens, Executive Director of the NATAS Suncoast Chapter.
