= Kim Prevost and Bill Solley =

American jazz duo

Kim & Bill
- Origin: New Orleans, Louisiana, U.S.
- Genre: Jazz
- Years active: 1996–present
- Labels: STR Records, Enthropya Records, Kim Prevost Records
- Members: Kim Prevost; Bill Solley
- Website: www.kimandbill.com

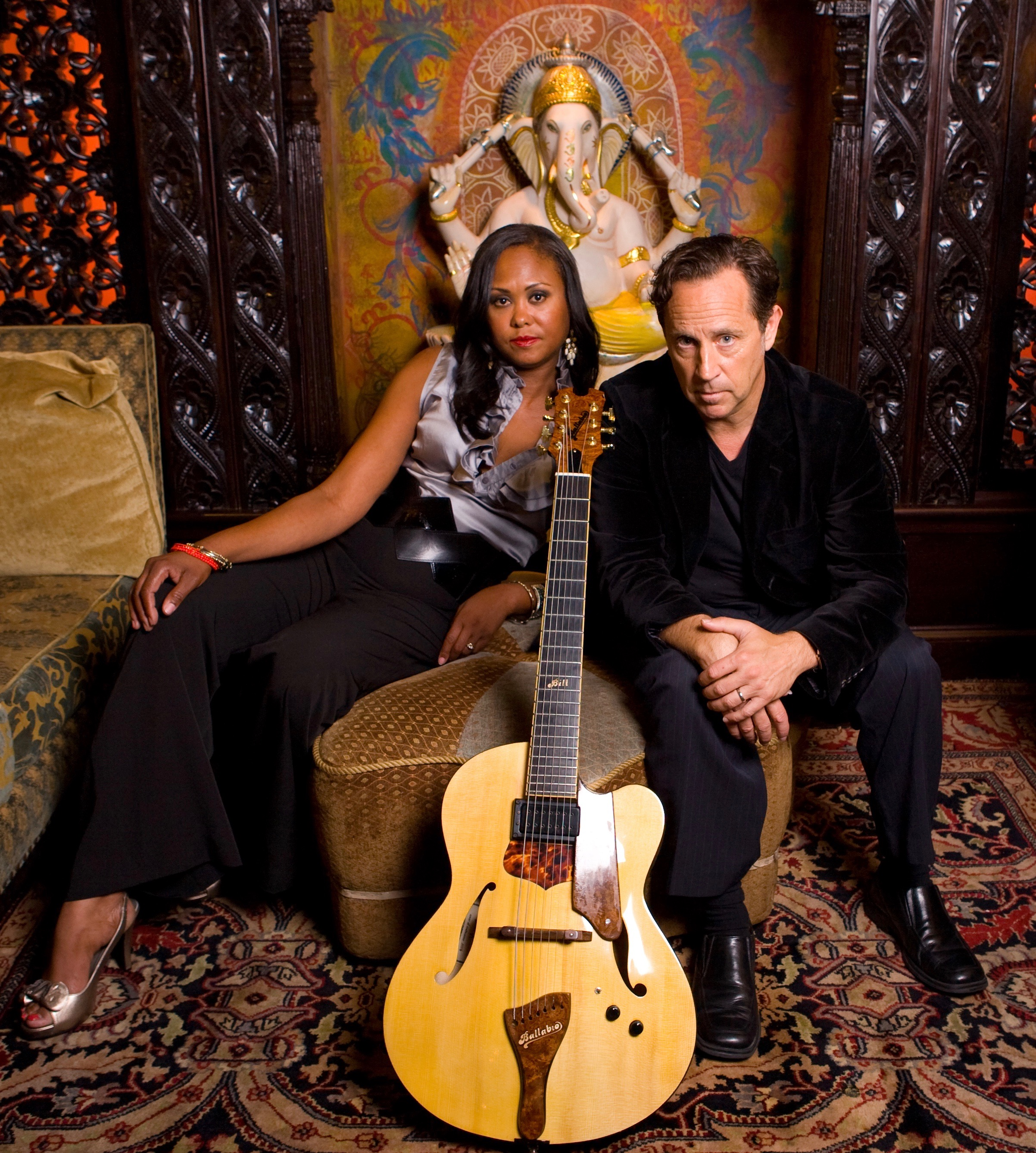
Kim Prevost & Bill Solley

Kim Prevost and Bill Solley are an American jazz duo consisting of singer-songwriter Kim Prevost (born April 27, 1968, in New Orleans, Louisiana) and guitarist-composer-Visual Artist https://fineartamerica.com/profiles/bill-solley Bill Solley (born December 13, 1957, in Jacksonville, Florida).

== Music career ==
Guitarist Bill Solley met singer Kim Prevost at an audition in New Orleans in 1996. Before this, Solley studied classical guitar at the University of New Orleans and was a session guitarist with Allen Toussaint. Prevost performed musical theatre in New Orleans, in a Cole Porter review under the direction of Allen Toussaint, and leading roles in "Sweet Charity", "Dreamgirls", "West Side Story", and "A Dose of Reality".

Prevost and Solley first performed as a duo in between sets of Summers Heat, Bill Summers' band, in which they both performed as well. Kim and Bill won the "Black Entertainment Television on Jazz" Jazz Discovery Award in 1999. Prevost and Solley were married in 2000 in New Orleans.

Prevost listened to Ella Fitzgerald and Billie Holiday as she shaped her own style which materialized as a crackling mixture of jazz, blues, funk and R&B – tinged gospel.

Kim and Bill relocated to Houston, Texas after Hurricane Katrina destroyed their home in New Orleans in 2005. Kim and Bill continue to tour and perform both in the Houston area and throughout the world.

== Discography ==
=== Kim Prevost and Bill Solley albums ===
Year	Album	Label	
1999	I Would Give All My Love	STR Records	
2005	Just in Time	Enthropya Records	
2015	Sky High	Kim Prevost Records	
2018	Heal My Heart	Kim Prevost Records	
2000	"On canal Street"	STR Records	Featuring Amina Figarova

=== Kim Prevost solo albums ===
Year	Album	Label
2002	Talk To Me	STR Records
2003	Precious Is His Love	Kim Prevost Records

=== Bill Solley solo albums ===
Year	Album	Label
2013	Solo Guitar Vol. 1	Kim Prevost Records
2017	Solo Guitar Vol. 2	Kim Prevost Records
