= Roberto Cabot =

Brazilian visual artist

Roberto Cabot (Rio de Janeiro, 1963) is a Brazilian visual artist.

== Career ==
Roberto Cabot is a visual artist and researcher at the École des Hautes Études en Sciences Sociales (EHESS). He started including the Internet in his art in 1996 and it soon became an integral part of his work. In 2008, he exhibited a large installation at the Martin Gropius Bau in Berlin which simultaneously displayed several live images from webcams in different tropical areas of the world. This was the last installation in his series on the "Aleph," a point in space that contains all other points, as described in Jorge Luis Borges' homonymous short story. He was nominated for the 8º Prêmio Sergio Motta de Arte e Tecnologia (Sergio Motta Prize for Art and Technology).

Roberto Cabot has displayed his work in many public and private collections, including the MASP and MAM - Gilberto Châteaubriand, in Brazil, Deutsche Bank and Hoffmann, in Germany, and CAAM - Centro Atlantico de Arte Moderna, in Spain.

== Exhibits ==
- 2008 Galerie Scala Berlin, "Alephology"; Martin Gropius Bau, "Tropics, Vision from the Center of the Earth", Berlin, Germany
- 2007 MAM - Museu de Arte Moderno, Rio de Janeiro, Novas Aquisições; Orlândia - Ocupação coletiva, Rio de Janeiro, Brazil.
- 2006 Museu de Arte Moderna, Rio de Janeiro, Museu Praia Reflexo; Galerie Brigitte Schenk, Köln. Germany; CCBB, Futebol, Rio de Janeiro, Brazil; SESC Pinheiros, Futebol, São Paulo, Brazil; Fundação Telemar, Câmaras de Luz, Rio de Janeiro, Brazil.
- 2005 Galeria Manoel Macedo, Sensacionema, Belo Horizonte, Brazil; Galeria Carmen de la Calle, El papel del papel, Madrid, Spain.
- 2004 Gal. Lurixs, Roberto Cabot, Rio de Janeiro, Brazil; Centro Cultural Banco do Brasil, "Carnaval", Rio de Janeiro, Brazil; Arquivo Geral, Jardim Botânico, Rio de Janeiro, Brazil.
- 2002 XXV Bienal de São Paulo, Brasil; Kunst und Schock- Das Geheimnis des Anderen, Haus am Lutzowsplatz, Berlin, Germany.
