= Amina Figarova =

Azerbaijani pianist and composer (born 1964)

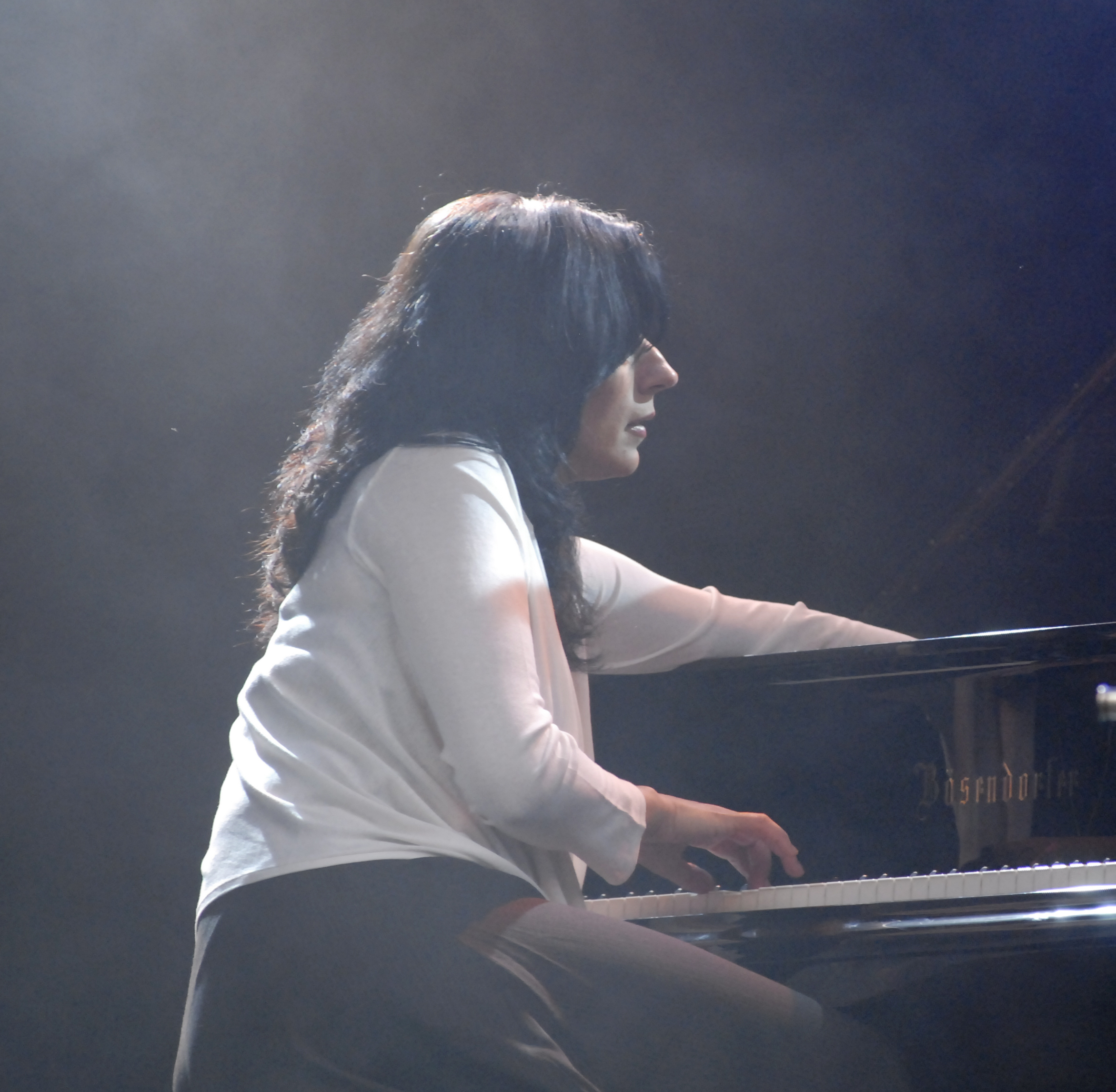
- Amina Figarova in 2007

Background information
- Born: Baku, Azerbaijan
- Genres: Jazz
- Occupation: Musician
- Instrument: Piano
- Years active: 1990s–present
- Website: aminafigarova.com

Amina Figarova is an Azerbaijani jazz pianist. Trained as a classical pianist in Baku, she became interested in the local folk music, later specializing in jazz. Since the late 1980s, together with her husband, the flutist Bart Platteau, she has performed in jazz festivals around the world.

== Biography ==
Born in Baku, Amina Figarova learnt to play the piano as a small child and began composing when only six. She attended the Baku Academy of Music where she studied to become a classical concert pianist. In 1988, while at the Moscow Jazz Festival, she was invited to study at the Rotterdam Conservatoire where she soon developed an interest in jazz. She completed her education at the Berklee College of Music in Boston.

While in the United States, she became involved in the Thelonious Monk Jazz Colony in Aspen, Colorado. Together with the flutist Bart Platteau whom she later married, she began to perform in jazz concerts around the world.

Her albums September Suite and more recently Blue Whisper were inspired in part by the events of 11 September 2001 when she was in New York playing at the Blue Note Jazz Club. Chicago critic Neil Tesser rates her as one of the leading contemporary jazz composers both with September Suite and Come Escape With Me.

Figarova's compositions include the musical Diana, and Tehora which she wrote for the Israeli singer Shlomit Butbul. She has now released 17 albums, becoming one of DownBeat's Rising Star Composers of the year in both 2014 and 2015.

== Discography ==
- Rachmaninov/Skriabin/Wieniawski (Erasmus, 1993)
- Attraction (Media Music, 1994)
- Another Me (Munich, 1996 [1998])
- Firewind (Munich, 1999)
- Jazz at the Pinehill – Live in Europe (Munich, 2000)
- Night Train (Munich, 2001)
- On Canal Street (STR/Munich, 2002) with Kim Prevost
- Come Escape with Me (Munich, 2004)
- September Suite (Munich, 2005)
- Above the Clouds (Munich, 2008)
- Sketches (Munich, 2010)
- Twelve (In+Out, 2012)
- Blue Whisper (In+Out, 2015)
- Road to the Sun (AmFi, 2019)
- Persistence (AmFi, 2020)
- Joy (AmFi, 2022)
- Suite for Africa (AmFi, 2024)
