= Group hug (disambiguation) =

A group hug is a hug that consists of more than two persons.

Group hug or Group Hug may also refer to:

- Group Hug (film), former working title of the 2012 film The Avengers
- Group Hug Tour, 2012 concert tour by Kreayshawn
