= Cuddles =

Cuddles may refer to a form of physical intimacy or:

As a nickname:

- Jamie Cudmore (born 1978), Canadian rugby union player
- Cadel Evans (born 1977), Australian cyclist
- Cuddles Marshall (1925-2007), American Major League Baseball relief pitcher
- S. Z. Sakall (1883-1955), Hungarian-born Hollywood character actor
- Greg Welts, former member of the American heavy metal band Slipknot (1997-1998)

Fictional characters:

- Cuddles, in the UK comic The Dandy - see Cuddles and Dimples
- Cuddles (Happy Tree Friends), a rabbit in the American flash cartoon Happy Tree Friends
- Cuddles the comfort doll, in the Canadian television series Puppets Who Kill
- Cuddles the Monkey, a puppet operated and voiced by ventriloquist Keith Harris
