= Adil Hussain Khan =

Professor of religious studies

Adil Hussain Khan is the Anne Morvant Elmer Distinguished Professor of Religious Studies at Loyola University New Orleans. His research is primarily concerned with sectarianism, orthodoxy, and Muslim identity. He is particularly interested in issues of authority and various aspects of Islamic intellectual tradition.

== Biography ==
He received his doctorate from the University of London's School of Oriental and African Studies (SOAS). He conducted postdoctoral research at University College Cork in Ireland on issues of Islam in Europe.

== Works ==
- From Sufism to Ahmadiyya: a Muslim minority movement in South Asia. Bloomington: Indiana University Press. 2015. ISBN 978-0-253-01523-5.
- Muslims in Ireland: Past and Present with Oliver Scharbrodt, Tuula Sakaranaho, Yafa Shanneik, and Vivian Ibrahim
