= Patrick R. Hugg =

American legal scholar and professor

Patrick R. Hugg is an American legal scholar and professor. He joined the Loyola University in 1986, after practising in labor and employment discrimination law in New Orleans, Louisiana. He holds the John J. McAulay Distinguished Professorship.

== Biography ==
Hugg received his A.B. in 1970 from Spring Hill College; his J.D. in 1978 from the University of Louisville; and his LL.M. in 1981 from Tulane University. He teaches a variety of subjects of law, including Appellate Advocacy, International Trade law, Comparative law, and European Union law. Hugg is the director of the Loyola International Programs, as well as the Vienna Summer Legal Studies Program, which he started in 1994. He served as a guest professor at the University of Vienna Law school in 1995 and at Yeditepe law faculty in Istanbul in 2004. Hugg has addressed audiences on various subjects, encompassing judicial opinion writing and appellate advocacy. His speaking engagements have included the National Judicial College and numerous national conferences.

== Publications ==
- "Judicial Style: An Exemplar," 33 Loy. L. Rev. 865-894 (1987).
- "Core Legal Abilities Must Be Taught," 94 Case & Com. 8-12 (Jan.-Feb. 1989).
- "Federalism's Full Circle: Relief for Education Discrimination," 35 Loy. L. Rev. 13-110 (1989).
- "Federal Judges Seek Improved Writing," 7 Fifth Cir. Rep. 633-639 (1990).
- "Professional Legal Writing; Declaring Your Independence," 11 J. Nat'l Ass'n Admin. L. Judges 114-144 (1991).
- "A Hybrid Theory for Education Reform," with Louis Miron, 36 Loy. L. Rev. 937-980 (1991).
- Book Review. The Justice from Beacon Hill: The Life and Times of Oliver Wendell Holmes, by Baker, 38 Loy. L. Rev. 557-573 (1992).
- "Professional Writing Methodology," 14 J. Nat'l Ass'n Admin. L. Judges 165-251 (1994).
- "Comparative Models for Legal Education in the United States: Improved Admissions Standards and Professional Training Centers," 30 Val. U. L. Rev. 51-98 (1995).
- "Transnational Convergence: European Union and American Federalism," 32 Cornell Int'l L.J. 43-108 (1998).
- The Republic of Turkey in Europe: Reconsidering the Luxembourg Exclusion," 23 Fordham Int'l L.J. 606-706 (2000).
- A Guide to European Union Commercial Practice, Oxford University Press, (2003).
