= List of Cisneros entities =

List of all franchised brands, exclusive licensing, and entities – past and present – of Grupo Cisneros:

== Key Cisneros dates ==
- 1929 – 1953: D. Cisneros & Cia., a small material-transport business
- 1953 – 1970: Cisneros Group of Companies
- 1970 – 2013: Cisneros Group of Companies
- 2013 – present: Grupo Cisneros
- 2011 – present: Cisneros Interactive
- March 2013 – present: Cisneros company split into three business divisions
  - Cisneros Media
  - Cisneros Interactive
  - Cisneros Real Estate
- April 2014 – present: Cisneros Media Distribution, global distributor of entertainment content

Philanthropies

- 1968: Diego Cisneros Foundation
- 1970 – present: Fundación Cisneros
- 2008 – present: Fundación Tropicalia
- 2009 – present: Cisneros Corporate Social Responsibility (CSR) Unit

== A ==
- Actualización de Maestros en Educación (AME):
  - 1998, Fundación Cisneros launches the first professional development program for teachers in Latin America via satellite television and internet
  - 2008, expansion by Fundación Cisneros and Barrick Mining
- ADOPEM Bank: 2016, Fundación Tropicalia and ADOPEM Bank launches “Miches Emprende”, a fund to support entrepreneurs in Miches, Dominican Republic
- Adsmovil, mobile advertising network in Latin America based in Bogota; see Redmas
- All-American Bottling: 1982, soft-drink bottling
- Aluyana, C.A.: 1988, aluminum smelting plant in Venezuela
- America Online: 1998, Internet service to Latin America
- Americatel: 1993, digital communication trunk service in Venezuela
- Apple Inc: 1984, exclusive franchise rights in Venezuela
- Audio.Ad:
  - 2014, RedMas audio advertising network in Latin America and US Hispanic market
  - 2015, launches in Brazil
  - 2016, launches in United States

== B ==
- Backus and Johnston: 2002, 20% stake, brewery in Peru
- Burger King: 1980, exclusive franchise rights in Venezuela

== C ==
- CADA Automercado: 1975, Venezuela’s first supermarket chain
- Caracol: 1997, broadcast television network and TV production company in Colombia
- Caribbean Communications Network Ltd.: 1994, communications and media company in Trinidad and Tobago
- Cervecería Regional: 1992, acquisition, brewery and beer distributor in Venezuela
- Cherry Blossom (candy), 1982, exclusive franchise rights in Venezuela
- Chilevision: 1992, acquisition, Chilean TV network
- China Central Television (CCTV): 2008, distribution agreement for the 2008 Summer Olympics in Beijing; 2012, agreement at NATPE to exchange documentary assets
- Cinemakit: 1985, Venezuelan video and film production company
- Cisneros Media: Cisneros Media production studios in Miami; see Cisneros Studios
- Cisneros Media Distribution (CMD):
- Cisneros Studios: 2014, rebranding of Cisneros Media production studios in Miami; see Cisneros Media
- Cisneros Television: 1996-2001, pay-television channels for international distribution; see Claxson Interactive Group Inc.
- Claxson Interactive Group Inc.: 2001, merger of Cisneros Television, Ibero-American Media Partners, and El Sitio, multimedia provider of branded entertainment content to Spanish- and Portuguese-speaking audiences worldwide
- Cl@se:
  - 1996, pan-regional Spanish educational television channel across Latin America, part of DirecTV Latin America deal
  - 2006, expands to Mexico via Mexico’s Latin American Institute for Educational Communication
  - 2007, expands to Peru via Peru's Ministry of Education
  - 2008, expands to Costa Rica via Ministry of Education of Costa Rica and Cable Tica
  - 2008, expands in Mexico via ILCE reach agreement
  - 2009, expands to Dominican Republic via Wind Telecom and the Ministry of Education of Dominican Republic
- Comarex: 2016, Cisneros Media Distribution international representation deal, Mexican distributor
- Commerce Union Bank: 1982
- Coyote Media House: 2014, investment, production company specializing in creating short form digital video for brands
- Creative Artists Agency (CAA): 2016, representation agreement with for Cisneros Media

== D ==
- Deezer: 2016, Audio.Ad advertising sales deal, music streaming service in Colombia
- DirecTV Latin America: 1995–present, with Hughes Electronics Corporation, all-digital direct-to-home satellite television service in Latin America
- Digital Equipment Corporation: 1983, exclusive franchise rights in Venezuela

== E ==
- Eccelera Holdings: 2000, Brazilian-based investment company focused on telecommunications, media, and technology
- eHow en Español, 2014: partnership of Cisneros Interactive and Demand Media for the branded digital advertising solutions in Latin America
- El Sitio: YYYY-2001; see Claxson Interactive Group Inc.
- Evenflo: 1984, acquisition, baby and children products

== F ==
- Facebook: 2017, Cisneros Interactive becomes official reseller in Ecuador, Paraguay, Bolivia, and Venezuela
- FLUVIP: 2015, Cisneros Interactive investment, influencer marketing company focused on Latin America; 2016, launches in Argentina
- Four Seasons Aspen: 2015, real estate development
- Four Seasons Hotels and Resorts: 2013, letter of intent for Tropicalia
- French's: 1982, exclusive franchise rights in Venezuela

== G ==
- Galerías Preciados: 1984, Spain's largest department store chain
- Gaveplast: 1970, produces plastic crates, cases and other materials for the retail market and beer and carbonated soft drink industries in South America

== H ==
- Hamilton Watch Company: 1939, exclusive franchise rights in Venezuela
- Helados Club Ice Cream Company, later known as Helados Tío Rico, S.A., also known as Tío Rico: 1952, largest manufacturer of ice cream in Venezuela
- Helene Curtis: 1976, via Laboratorios Fisa beauty products
- Hispanic Broadcasting Corporation: 2002, acquisition by Univision, radio broadcasting company in the U.S.; see Univision Radio

== I ==
- Ibero-American Media Partners: 1997-2001, investment fund focused on media, with Hicks, Muse, Tate & Furst, Inc.; see Claxson Interactive Group Inc.
- Ibero-American Radio Chile: 1998, acquires, consolidates, and operates radio stations in Chile
- Imagen Satelital: 1997, acquisition by Cisneros Television, pay-television channels in Argentina

== K ==
- Kontextua: 2012, acquisition and merged into RedMas, online advertising network focusing on display, in-text, and in-image ad formats; see RedMas

== L ==
- Laboratorios Fisa, 1976, produces and distributes beauty products, includes Helene Curtis brand
- Latcel: 2004, joint venture of Venevisión International and WAU Móvil, wireless content services for U.S. Hispanic market; 2011, becomes mobile advertising network targeting the US Hispanic market; see Cisneros Interactive
- Liquid Carbonic: 1944, produces carbon dioxide and related products
- Los Leones del Caracas: 2001, acquisition, baseball franchise in Venezuela

== M ==
- Maxy’s: 1983, Sears, Roebuck & Company department stores are renamed Maxy's, the country’s largest retail chain store in Venezuela; see Sears, Roebuck & Company
- Millennial Media: 2013, strategic partnership with Adsmovil, independent mobile advertising and data platform to commercialize advertising solutions in Latin America
- Minalba: 1986, acquisition, mineral water
- Miss Venezuela: 1981, beauty pageant
- Miss Universe Philippines: 2023, beauty pageant in the Philippines
- Moat: 2015, partnership with Adsmovil to measure viewability
- MOBIUS.LAB Productions: 2015, Cisneros Media Distribution launches a content development platform with Getty Images Latin America
- Mobly: 2013-2015, Cisneros Interactive investment Brazilian home furnishing web store, part of Rocket Internet
- Movida: 2006, first Hispanic mobile virtual network operator in the United States.
- MuchMusic Argentina: 1998, Cisneros Television acquires music television channel in Argentina and the Southern Cone

== N ==
- Norge: 1939, exclusive franchise rights in Venezuela
- Novulu: 2009, Venevisión International entertainment portal

== O ==
- O’Caña Distributors: 1974, liquor distribution company
- Open English: 2013-2014, joint venture of Cisneros Interactive and Open English, launch Open English in the United States, targeting US Hispanics and Puerto Rico

== P ==
- Paternoster Square, 1988: large-scale office and retail complex development in London, managed in partnership with Park Tower Realty, Greycoat and Mitsubishi Estates.
- Pepsi-Cola: 1940, exclusive franchise rights in Venezuela
- Pizza Hut: 1983, exclusive franchise rights in Venezuela
- Playboy TV International: 1998, partnership by Cisneros Television with Playboy Enterprises, Inc.
- Proyectos Pet, C.A.: 1982, bottle supplier for Hit and Pepsi-Cola beverages in Venezuela
- Pueblo Xtra International: 1993, supermarket chain in Puerto Rico, U.S. Virgin Islands, and South Florida

== R ==
- Radiovision: 1974, Venezuela's first national radio network
- RedMas: 2011, advertising network and mobile ad studio; 2012 became part of Adsmovil; see Adsmovil
- REO Trucks: 1939, exclusive franchise rights in Venezuela
- Rodven Group of Companies: 1980, manufactures records, cassettes, video

== S ==
- San Bernardo: 1986, acquisition, mineral water
- Sears, Roebuck & Company: 1983, Sears department stores are renamed Maxy’s, the country’s largest retail chain store in Venezuela; see Maxy's
- Siente Music: 2006, joint venture of Venevisión International and Universal Music Latino (part of Universal Music Group)
- Spalding Company: 1984, acquisition, sporting goods company
- Spark Media: 2016, FLUVIP acquires a 60% stake, marketing company in Brazil
- Story.Ad: 2015, launched by RedMas, native ad platform
- Studebaker: 1947, exclusive franchise rights in Venezuela

== T ==
- Tail Target: 2015, joint venture of Cisneros Interactive and Tail Target, data management platform company based in Brazil but located across Latin America and U.S.
- Televisión Latina: 1982, distributor of Venevisión to U.S. Hispanic market
- Triton Digital: 2016, Audio.Ad exclusive ad sales representation agreement, audio streaming providers and operators of A2X, an audio ad exchange
- Tropicalia: 2009, Dominican Republic real estate development with environmental and socially responsible tourism slant
- Tu clase, tu país: 2014, teacher training program in Dominican Republic and Venezuela

== U ==
- United Nations Population Fund: 2015, agreement signed by Cisneros Media to contribute to the prevention of teen pregnancy through awareness campaigns
- UN Women: 2013, memorandum of understanding to contribute to gender equality and the empowerment of women through content production
- UNICEF: 2012, agreement to contribute to peace education and adolescent development in Venezuela through sports and art
- Univision: 1992-2007, acquisition, part of three-entity consortium with Jerry Perenchio and Emilio Azcarraga Jean
- Univision Radio: 2002, radio station; see Hispanic Broadcasting Corporation

== V ==
- Venemobile: 2007, produces and distributes mobile games and applications
- VeneMovies: 2006, first full-featured Spanish-language film channel in the U.S.
- VeneMusic: 2003, Latin music label
- Venevisión: 1961–present
- Venevisión Continental: 2000, pay-television network targeting global Spanish-speaking population
- Venevisión International Theater: 2001, production and distribution of Spanish-language plays
- Venevisión Plus: 2007, Spanish-language 24/7 worldwide pay-TV channel
- Venevisión Plus Dominicana: 2010, Dominican Republic
- Venevisión Studios: 2004, production facility in Miami
- Videomovil Color, C.A.: 1988, production company
- VMAS TV: 2012, pay-TV channel in Colombia

== X ==
- Xapp Media: 2016, Audio.Ad launches interactive audio ads

== Y ==
- Yahoo!: 2012, RedMas becomes Yahoo!’s exclusive advertising representative in Venezuela, Peru, Ecuador and Dominican Republic
- Yukery Venezolana de Alimentos: 1986, producer and distributor of fruit juices, ketchup, chocolate, baby food, and pasteurized milk

== Z ==
- Zhejiang Huace Film & TV Co.: 2012, co-production deal of telenovela in China
