= Adriana Cisneros =

Venezuelan businesswoman (born 1979)

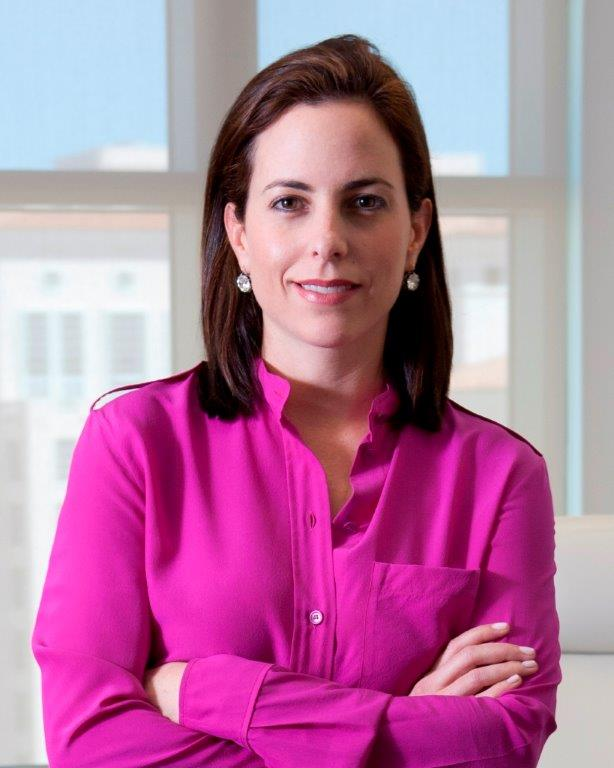
- Cisneros in 2017
- Born: Adriana Cisneros Phelps de Griffin; 17 December 1979 (age 46); Caracas, Venezuela
- Education: Columbia University (BA); New York University (MA)
- Occupations: CEO and vice-chairman, Grupo Cisneros
- Spouse: Nicholas Griffin
- Children: 2
- Parent(s): Gustavo Cisneros; Patricia Phelps de Cisneros
- Relatives: Diego Cisneros (grandfather)

Adriana Cisneros Phelps de Griffin (born 17 December 1979) is a Venezuelan businesswoman and the CEO of Grupo Cisneros, a privately owned media, entertainment, digital media, real estate, tourism resorts and consumer products company. She is also president of the Fundación Cisneros.

== Early life and education ==
Cisneros was born in Caracas, Venezuela, to Gustavo Cisneros and Patricia Phelps. Cisneros' paternal grandfather was Diego Cisneros, who founded Grupo Cisneros. Her maternal grandfather was William H. Phelps, Jr. Her maternal great-grandfather was William H. Phelps, Sr., who, in 1953, started the first television station in Venezuela. Both were noted businessmen and ornithologists. She has an older brother, Guillermo Cisneros, and an older sister, Carolina Cisneros de Rodríguez.

In 1998, she graduated from Deerfield Academy, a boarding school in Deerfield, Massachusetts, which she and other family members attended.

In 2002, Cisneros received a bachelor's degree from Columbia University. In 2005, she received a master's degree in journalism from New York University. In 2010, Cisneros attended Harvard Business School's Program for Leadership Development.

== Career ==
Cisneros worked at the organization Aid for AIDS, which promotes awareness and treatment of AIDS in Latin America.

=== Grupo Cisneros ===
Grupo Cisneros is one of the largest privately held media entertainment organizations in the world.

From 2009 to August 2013, Cisneros was vice chairman and director of strategy at Grupo Cisneros. In this position, Cisneros worked with her father and then CEO, Steven Bandel, to create a transition plan. In 2013, at the age of 33, Cisneros was appointed CEO of Grupo Cisneros, taking over from Bandel.

Cisneros is the third generation of her family to lead Grupo Cisneros. Her paternal grandfather, Diego Cisneros, was the organization’s founder, and she is the daughter of its former chairman, Gustavo Cisneros and Patricia Phelps de Cisneros.

Cisneros reorganized the company into three divisions. The three divisions are: Cisneros Media, Cisneros Interactive and Cisneros Real Estate. Cisneros Media was the legacy business, while Cisneros Interactive and Cisneros Real Estate were business units that she created from scratch.

- Cisneros Media: Includes the Venezuelan TV Channel, Venevisión, as well as cable TV channels Venevision Plus, VmasTV and VePlusTV. Cisneros is the owner of the Miss Venezuela Organization, which holds a record six Miss World and seven Miss Universe titles. It also includes the corporate enterprises as Cisneros Media Distribution; Venevision Productions; the record labels VeneMusic and Siente Music and the concert producer and promoter VeneShow
- Cisneros Interactive: Digital media division created on 2011, focused on digital and mobile publicity, e-commerce, social games and crowd-founding. It includes RedMas and Adsmovil companies, besides investment enterprises as Cuponidad, Mobly, Idea.me and Queremos
- Cisneros Real Estate: Real Estate division which includes Tropicalia, a sustainable tourism development located in Dominican Republic

Cisneros has said that she built upon approaches used first by her grandfather, Diego Cisneros, and later perfected by her father, Gustavo Cisneros, to establish pan-regional business relationships. An example of her father's work to distribute risk and innovate across the region was his roll-out of DirecTV Latin America in the 1990s. Corporate social responsibility is an integral part of decision-making, as Cisneros sees it as being good business to focus on responsible and strategic members within the communities they operate. One example of this is the January 1996 launch of Cl@se, the first pan-regional education channel initiative, coordinated with each country's ministry of education, that utilized DirecTV Latin American feeds and created accessible free educational programming on TVs in classrooms throughout the region.

Cisneros has been instrumental in establishing a nimble approach to business for Cisneros. She uses a small team of generalist finance and legal specialists to work on long-term goals, acquisitions, and planning.

Cisneros Interactive focuses on monetizing digital traffic with a pan-regional approach to extending their ad network. In November 2016, Cisneros Interactive started a partnership with Facebook Latin America to be its exclusive reseller in Latin American countries including Venezuela, Paraguay, Ecuador and Bolivia.

=== Fundación Cisneros ===
Cisneros has served as the President of the Fundación Cisneros, a non-profit organization founded by her parents, Gustavo Cisneros and Patricia Phelps de Cisneros, that strives to improve education in Latin America and foster global awareness of the region’s heritage and its contribution to world culture. She also oversaw the foundation’s educational initiatives, including the teacher training program, Actualización de Maestros en Educación (AME).

== Personal life ==
In 2007, Cisneros married British novelist Nicholas Griffin. They have two children, and live in Miami, Florida.

== Leadership ==
- AST SpaceMobile, board member
- Citibank Private Bank Latin American Advisory Board, Member
- Council on Foreign Relations, Term Member
- Endeavor Miami, co-chair and board member
- Ford Motor Company, board member
- International Academy of Television Arts & Sciences' International Emmys, Director and Executive Board Member
- Knight Foundation, Board of Trustees member
- Mattel, board member
- Museum of Modern Art, International Council and Latin American and Caribbean Fund
- MoMA PS1, board member
- Paley Center for Media, Trustee
- The Aspen Institute. Henry Crown Fellowship
- The Electric Factory, board member
- John S. and James L. Knight Foundation, trustee
- Wyncode, Advisory Board Member
- University of Miami, Board of Trustees member

== Awards ==
- 2015: NATPE Brandon Tartikoff Legacy Award recipient with her father, Gustavo Cisneros

== See also ==
- Colección Patricia Phelps de Cisneros
- List of Venezuelan Americans
- List of chief executive officers
- Chavit Singson
