= Patricia Phelps de Cisneros =

Venezuelan art collector and philanthropist

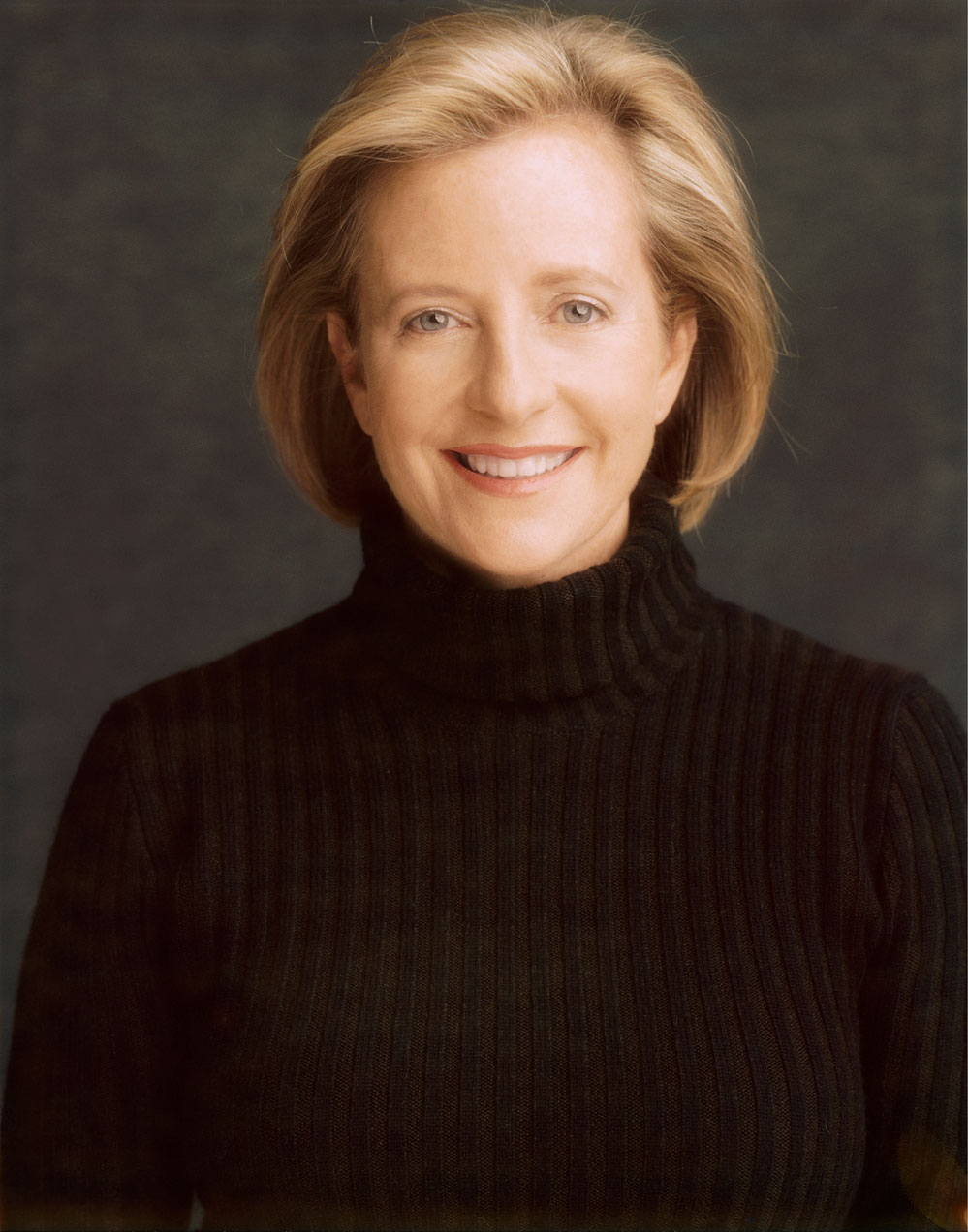
- Born: Patricia Phelps y Parker; Caracas, Venezuela
- Other name: Patty Cisneros
- Citizenship: Venezuela; Dominican Republic (since 2021)
- Education: Wheaton College
- Years active: 1970s-present
- Organization: Colección Patricia Phelps de Cisneros
- Spouse: Gustavo Cisneros (m. 1970; died 2023)
- Children: 3, including Adriana Cisneros
- Relatives: William H. Phelps Sr. (great grandfather)
- Website: ColecciónCisneros.org

Patricia "Patty" Phelps de Cisneros is a Venezuelan-born Dominican arts and education advocate. Since the 1970s Cisneros has led initiatives to expand access to educational and cultural resources, including large scale literacy and teacher training programs across the region. She is also recognized for her work as an art collector, with a particular focus on Latin American modernist and contemporary art from Brazil, Venezuela, and the Río de la Plata region of Argentina and Uruguay. Along with her late husband, Gustavo A. Cisneros, she founded the New York City and Caracas-based Fundación Cisneros, which launched several educational and cultural programs. In the 1990s the Fundación's primary art-related program became the Colección Patricia Phelps de Cisneros. In 2016, Cisneros donated 102 modern and contemporary artworks from the 1940s to 1990s to the Museum of Modern Art, establishing the Patricia Phelps de Cisneros Research Institute for the Study of Art from Latin America at MoMA.

== Early life and education ==
Cisneros was born in Venezuela to Miriam Louise Parker and William Walter Phelps, a businessman. Her paternal great-grandfather was a noted businessman and ornithologist, William H. Phelps, Sr. In 1953, William Henry Phelps Sr. started the first radio station in Venezuela, Radio Caracas Televisión Internacional (RCTV Internacional).

Cisneros received a BA in Philosophy from Wheaton College, Massachusetts in 1969, where she studied the educational philosophy of Alfred North Whitehead.

In 2003, Wheaton College awarded her an honorary degree. She was an MA candidate at NYU’s Gallatin School, and was awarded an honorary doctorate from the Graduate Center of the City University of New York in 2015.

== Career ==
In her twenties, Cisneros became the founder and director of the language department of the Simon Bolívar University, Caracas. There, she developed an innovative audio-visual approach to teaching foreign languages. She also worked with Accion International and was a founding contributor of AVEPANE (Asociación Venezolana de Padres y Amigos de Niños Excepcionales).

Through the Fundación Cisneros, Patricia and Gustavo Cisneros launched a number of education initiatives. In 1979, they created the Asociación Cultural para el Desarrollo (ACUDE) in Venezuela, whose literacy program served over 300,000 students across the country. The program utilized a comprehensive multimedia pedagogy called Sono-Estudio Curso to shift the focus of writing and literacy away from traditional educational settings and into contexts that address everyday needs, from social interaction to health, hygiene and job performance. The Fundación Cisneros also created Cl@se, an educational television channel that reached over two million homes from Argentina to Mexico; AME, an international professional development program for teachers conducted through distance-learning; and Piensa en Arte, a methodological model for teaching critical thinking skills.

In 1985, Patricia and Gustavo Cisneros founded Fundación Mozarteum Venezuela, which is dedicated to music education. In addition to organizing mater classes and concerts with world-renowned musicians such as Zubin Mehta, Seiji Ozawa, and Sándor Végh, The Fundación Mozarteum Venezuela has also provided scholarships and facilitated international partnerships to nurture young musical talent. The organization has helped foster cultural appreciation through public concerts and community outreach activities, making classical music accessible to a broad Venezuelan audience.

From 2014 to 2017, the Fundación Cisneros provided professional development in Venezuela and the Dominican Republic with the online platform called Tu Clase, tu país.

== Colección Patricia Phelps de Cisneros ==
In the 1970s, during her travels across Latin America with her husband, Cisneros spent her time visiting artists in their studios and seeing art in local galleries and museums, and began actively purchasing and collecting artwork. Primarily collecting indigenous work during frequent expeditions through Venezuela, especially around the Orinoco in the Amazon River Basin.

As her collection grew, Cisneros saw that Latin American art was under-represented in the international art community, so the Colección Patricia Phelps de Cisneros (CPPC) was formed in the 1990s, with a goal of bringing visibility and impact to the way Latin American art history is viewed and appreciated. That effort has included a four-pronged approach: An ambitious approach to lending artworks around the world, working with scholars and academics to learn more about the artists and their works, the creation of a publications program to provide supporting information about the artists and their work, and building an online forum for the artwork.

The CPPC is best known for its collection of Modernist geometric abstraction from Latin America and also comprises holdings of Latin American landscapes by traveler artists to Latin America in the 17th to 19th centuries; furniture and art from Latin America's colonial period; contemporary art from Latin America; and an important group of art and artifacts from indigenous peoples of Venezuela's Amazonas region, the Orinoco Collection. The mission of the Colección Patricia Phelps de Cisneros is to enhance appreciation of the diversity, sophistication, and range of art from Latin America.

Gradually, Cisneros began acquiring geometric abstract artwork that had been under-appreciated. It gradually grew into a significant holding of 20th century Latin American abstract art. She has appeared on “top collector lists every year since 1998. Cisneros has been lending her collections to international exhibitions and institutions since 1999.

Cisneros credits her understanding of the importance of stewardship as a collector to her great-grandfather, William H Phelps, who meticulously cataloged his ornithological collection. She has said that her aesthetic developed as a result of having grown up in the modernist society of Caracas in the 1950s and 1960s.

Cisneros has had a long-term relationship with the Museum of Modern Art in New York. The 2016 donation of 102 modern and contemporary Latin American artworks from the 1940s to 1990s to the Museum of Modern Art, which establishes the Patricia Phelps de Cisneros Research Institute for the Study of Art from Latin America at MoMA, join the previous donation by Colección Cisneros of over 40 other previously donated works. The gift is meant to be transformative and impactful on how Latin American art is valued and recognized globally. The gift includes works by Lygia Clark, Lygia Pape, Jesús Rafael Soto, Alejandro Otero, and Tomás Maldonado. Additional highlights are works by Willys de Castro, Hélio Oiticica, Juan Mele, Mira Schendel, and Gego. The Cisneros Institute will be located in a dedicated space at the current MoMA campus in midtown Manhattan.

In January 2018, it was announced that more than 200 artworks, many from contemporary artists, would be donated by the collection to six institutions with whom Cisneros has had long-term relationships: the Museum of Modern Art; the Bronx Museum of the Arts; the Museo Nacional Centro de Arte Reina Sofía in Madrid, Spain; the Museo de Arte Moderno in Buenos Aires, Argentina; the Museo de Arte de Lima in Lima, Peru; and the Blanton Museum of Art at the University of Texas, Austin in Austin, Texas. The gifts include works by Amalia Pica, Jac Leirner, Luis Camnitzer, and Regina José Galindo.

== Personal life ==
She married Gustavo Cisneros in 1970 in St Patrick's Cathedral in New York City. They have three children: Guillermo Cisneros, Carolina Cisneros de Rodríguez, and Adriana Cisneros, who is CEO and Vice Chairman of Grupo Cisneros.

== Boards and memberships ==
Current work

- 1986–present: Americas Society (New York, New York). Cultural Council Committee
- 1992–present: Museum of Modern Art (New York, New York). Trustee; 2006: Founder and Chair, MoMA's Latin American and Caribbean Fund; Member of other MoMA Committees
- 2011–present: Museum Berggruen (Berlin, Germany). International Council
- 2015–present: The Feuerle Collection (Berlin, Germany). Founding member, International Ambassadors
- 2015–present: Círculo Internacional de la Escuela de Música Reina Sofía, Museo Reina Sofía, (Madrid, Spain). International Patron
- 2017–present: Museum of Fine Arts, Boston (Boston, Massachusetts). Member, Denman Waldo Ross Society at the Museum of Fine Arts, Boston
- 2020–present: American Academy of Arts and Sciences (Cambridge, Massachusetts). Member; 2020: Council; 2021
- 2022–present: : Patronato Fundación Museo de Arte Contemporáneo de Barcelona (Barcelona, Spain). Trustee

Past work

- 1970-1980: Museo de Bellas Artes (Caracas, Venezuela). Board member and member of the Friends of the Museo de Bellas Artes
- 1980-1983: Just One Break (JOB) (New York, New York). Board Member
- 1985-1993: New York Botanical Garden (New York, New York). Board member
- 1986–2017: Americas Society (New York, New York). 1981–2017: Board of Directors; 1985–2017: Chairman's International Council
- 1987-1990: Sinfonietta Caracas (Caracas, Venezuela). Advisory Board
- 1991: Escuela Superior de Música Reina Sofía, Museo Reina Sofía. Founding Patron
- 1992-1996: Metropolitan Museum of Art (New York, New York). Chairman's Council
- 1994-2011: Harvard University (Cambridge, Massachusetts). 1994: Founding board member; 1998-2011: Advisory Committee, David Rockefeller Center for Latin American Studies
- 1997-2000: Archer M. Huntington Art Gallery, University of Texas at Austin (Austin, Texas). Latin American Advisory Group
- 1997-2003: Programa Andes Tropicales (Mérida, Venezuela). Founding member, Board of Directors
- 1998-2012: Casita Maria (New York, New York). 1998-2008: Board member; 2008-2012: Chairman's Council
- 2001–2015: Harvard University (Cambridge, Massachusetts). Committee to Visit the Harvard University Art Museums
- 2003-2014: Tate (London, England). 2003-2014: Founding member of Latin American Acquisitions Committee; 2003-2008: International Council
- 2004-2006: UBS (New York, New York). Art Advisory Board
- 2004–2020: Aspen Institute (Aspen, Colorado). 2004–2020: Art Advisory Committee; 2004-2010: Society of Fellows, Presidential level
- 2007–2017: Patronato Internacional del Museo del Prado, Museo del Prado (Madrid, Spain). Founding International Trustee
- 2009-2017: International Committee of International Council of Museums (ICOM) for Museums and Collections of Modern Art (CIMAM). Founding Member
- 2011-2014: American Friends of the Fondation Beyeler, Beyeler Foundation (Basel, Switzerland). Member
- 2011-2014: Association Centre Pompidou América Latina, Centre Georges Pompidou (París, France). Founding Member
- 2012–2020: Fundación Museo Reina Sofía, Museo Reina Sofía (Madrid, Spain). 2012–2020: Founding Patron; 2015–2020: Nominating and Governance Committee
- 2012–2024: Leadership Council of Independent Curators International (ICI) (New York, New York)
- 2016–2018: Fundação Bienal de São Paulo, São Paulo Art Biennial (São Paulo, Brasil). Founding International Advisory Board member

== Honors and awards ==
- 1986: Order of Andrés Bello (Caracas, Venezuela) – Granted by Venezuelan government in recognition of contribution to the cultural development of the country (en reconocimiento a su contribución al desarollo cultural de país), Band of Honor, first class
- 1986: Order of Good Citizen (Caracas, Venezuela) − Granted by City Council of Caracas for community leadership
- 1991: Order of Francisco de Miranda (Caracas, Venezuela) – Granted by Venezuelan government to citizens who have exemplified outstanding merits (logros excepcionales como ciudadano)
- 1999: Order of Simón Bolívar, Venezuela
- 2000: Leone d’Oro di San Marco, awarded to the Colección Orinoco program area of the Fundación Cisneros
- 2002: Cross of Ordre national de la Légion d'honneur – Granted by Republic of France
- 2003: Wheaton College (Norton, Massachusetts), Honorary degrees in Fine Arts
- 2005: Recipient, medals of Honor – Granted by Ministry of Culture, Colombia for work in promoting education and culture in Latin America (2 medals: Senado de la República, Orden del Congreso de Colombia en el grado de Cemendados; and Camara de la Democracia Simón Bolivar en el grado cruz de comendador)
- 2008: Americas Society (New York, New York), Americas Society's Gold Medal
- 2008: Skowhegan School of Painting and Sculpture (New York, New York), The Gertrude Vanderbilt Whitney Award for Outstanding Patronage of the Arts
- 2010: Bard Graduate Center: Decorative Arts, Design History, Material Culture (New York, New York), The Iris Foundation Award
- 2013: ArtTable (New York, New York), Distinguished Service in the Arts award
- 2013: The Gran Cruz de la Orden Civil de Alfonso X el Sabio – Granted by Monarchy of Spain (Spain)
- 2015: Medalla de Oro al Mérito en las Bellas Artes – Granted by Ministerio de Educación, Cultura y Deporte de España (Spain)
- 2015: Graduate Center of the City University of New York (New York, New York), Honorary Doctorate of Humane Letters Degree
- 2017: Premio Iberoamericano de Mecenazgo (Madrid, Spain)
- 2017: Independent Curators International, Leo Award
- 2018: The Olana Partnership (New York), The Frederic Church Award
- 2019: Revista ARS (Madrid, Spain), Premio Arte y Empresa, awarded for Best Donation.
- 2023: International Women's Council, Pérez Art Museum Miami (Florida), 2023 IWC Honoree.
- 2024: Escuela Superior de Música Reina Sofía (Madrid, Spain), Commemorative plaque in honor of her numerous contributions to the Escuela Superior de Música Reina Sofía, its Sinfonietta, and the Fundación Mozarteum Venezuela.
- 2025: Fundación ARCO, (Madrid, Spain), Premio "A" Honorífico.

== Works and publications ==
- Cisneros, Patricia Phelps de (2016). "Reinvention: Collector as Custodian". In Holo, Selma; Alvarez, Mari-Tere (eds.). Remix: Changing Conversations in Museums of the Americas. Oakland, California: University of California Press. pp. 200–203. ISBN 978-0-52-028452-4. OCLC 921821810.

== See also ==
- Gustavo Cisneros
- Adriana Cisneros
- William H. Phelps, Sr.
- William H. Phelps, Jr.
- List of Venezuelan Americans
