= ¡Qué Locura! =

Television series, 2000

- Genre: Comedy
- Created by: Fernando Camacho; Domingo Carreras
- Written by: Bolivar Hidalgo "Bolivita"; William Omar Landrón "Don Omar"; Hugo Carregal; Cristian Lizama; Luís Moncho Martínez; Manuel Mateo; Manuel Novoa; Julio César Istúriz; Oliver López; Amílcar Vidal; Fernando Camacho; Domingo Carreras
- Directed by: Rafael Suárez
- Creative director: Eduard Jiménez
- Presented by: Ernesto Cortéz (2000-present)
- Starring: Luís Moncho Martínez; Guillermo Díaz; Sandy Izaguirrez; Irán Lovera; Julio César Istúriz; Néstor Citino
- Countries of origin: United States; Venezuela
- Original language: Spanish
- No. of episodes: 150

Production
- Executive producer: Hugo Carregal
- Producers: Luís Moncho Martínez; Douglas Hernández; Julio Cesar Isturiz; Edgardo Márquez; Oliver López
- Production locations: Venevision International Studios; Miami, Florida, United States; Venevision Studios; Caracas, Venezuela
- Running time: 60 minutes

Original release
- Network: Venevision; Venevision International; Univision
- Release: April 1, 2000

¡Qué Locuras! is a hidden camera-comedy television show from the United States and Venezuela. In English, "¡Qué Locuras!" translates as "What Craziness!" or "What Follies!" The premise of the show involves hidden cameras filming pranks on celebrities, both local and international. It is similar to Punk'd on MTV in the United States.

== Production information ==
The show was first broadcast in 2000 and hosted by Ernesto Cortéz, who is best known for appearing in the sketch comedy show, Bienvenidos. ¡Qué Locuras! is produced by Venevision International in the United States and directed by Hugo Carregal, and had, as of the beginning of 2007, around 150 episodes. ¡Qué Locuras! has become a hit in the United States (where it was shown by Univision) as well as in other South American countries.

In 2018, Moncho Martinez, an actor who played several characters in the show, decided to bring it back to life as a theater play, with initial presentations in the northern Venezuelan city of Maracaibo.

== Notable pranks ==
=== Pranks involving characters played by Luís Moncho Martínez ===
Dominican television actor Luís Moncho Martínez, who has produced the show since its debut, has created (and starred in) numerous pranks for the program. Among these pranks are:

- El Inspector Rodriguez

A celebrity is driven to Venevision's studio facility, thinking that they are going to participate in a television show (particularly Súper Sábado Sensacional) and Guerra de los Sexos. Upon entering the parking lot, the celebrity gets told by the "security guard" known as Inspector Rodriguez (played by Luís Moncho Martínez) that they cannot proceed because the celebrity's name does not appear on the list of Venevision's guests for that day. Rodriguez would frequently tease and demean them to leave the premises in a way that would provoke the celebrities to yell at him (and even get into a physical altercation).

- Cocinando Con Ermo (translated: Cooking With Ermo)

A fake cooking show starring Ermo (played by Luís Moncho Martínez), an overly effeminate chef, was put on to lure celebrities into a trap consisting of Ermo arguing with his assistant (played by Irán Lovera), causing both of them to throw food and condiments at each other, with the celebrity in the middle of it all.

- Ruperto

Ruperto (played by Luís Moncho Martínez) is a mentally incapacitated man who wants to get a picture with every celebrity that arrives on the Venevision complex. As the celebrity is interviewed in the hallway by a man posing as a Venevision reporter (who is mentioned in the segment as Ruperto's brother), Ruperto starts getting excited and starts harassing the celebrity.

- El Pintor Malandro (translated: Malandro the Painter)

Luís Moncho Martínez disguises himself as a painter hired by Venevision to repaint the walls of the complex and would often flirt with any young actress or even a Miss Venezuela contestant who passes by the hallway where he is painting the walls, leading to the women accusing him of sexual harassment.

- Ricardo

Ricardo (played by Luís Moncho Martínez) is a psychic who invites celebrities to his show and mentions to them what he knows about them by using cards and watermelon seeds. Ricardo provokes fights by mentioning the celebrities' personal lives, as well as ridiculously false statements about them.

- Te Voy a Sorprender (translated: I'm Going to Surprise You)

A fake show starring Carlitos Dugarte (played by Luís Moncho Martínez) involves an old woman and her two grown children in the studio audience who want to invite a celebrity to their home for a few days. When the celebrity refuses, the old woman of the family gets upset, faints on the set and pretends to die in order to scare the celebrity. As an alternate prank in this segment, two celebrities (each paired with an actor from ¡Qué Locuras! disguised as an audience member) compete against each other in a trivia contest. Carlitos Dugarte asks the male celebrity the difficult questions in order to provoke a fight between the two. The original format of this segment was retooled and featured a man pretending to need a wheelchair to convince a female celebrity to go out on a date with him, and losing his temper in the green room when she refuses.

- Entrevista con el Pibe (translated: Interview with Pibe)

A circus-themed segment involving Pibe (played by Luís Moncho Martínez) interviewing a celebrity, three clowns known as "Primer Piso" ("First Floor"), "Segundo Piso" ("Second Floor") and "Tercer Piso" ("Third Floor") are said to appear in a latter part of this segment, but instead torture both Pibe and the celebrity guest by throwing pie plates at them, eventually causing a brawl.

- Albondiga y Spaghetti

This prank involves Martinez dressed as a clown filming a kids show presenting celebrities Martinez then proceeds to disrupt filming and insult his guest with making suggestions about their appearance and looks until provoking a physical altercation.

- El Show de Luisa

This prank involves a talk show segment in which Moncho Martinez plays a creator of a face cream product. After the interview the celebrity mainly women try on the cream and one of his clients storms the set claiming the product does damage to her face provoking a scare to the celebrity.

=== Other pranks ===
Other pranks include distorting music during a Lito & Polaco performance, pornographic film scenes "cutting in" during a broadcast of a 2002 FIFA World Cup match, and fake policemen stopping celebrity cars to hand out "tickets".
