= Diego Cisneros =

Venezuelan businessman (1911–1980)

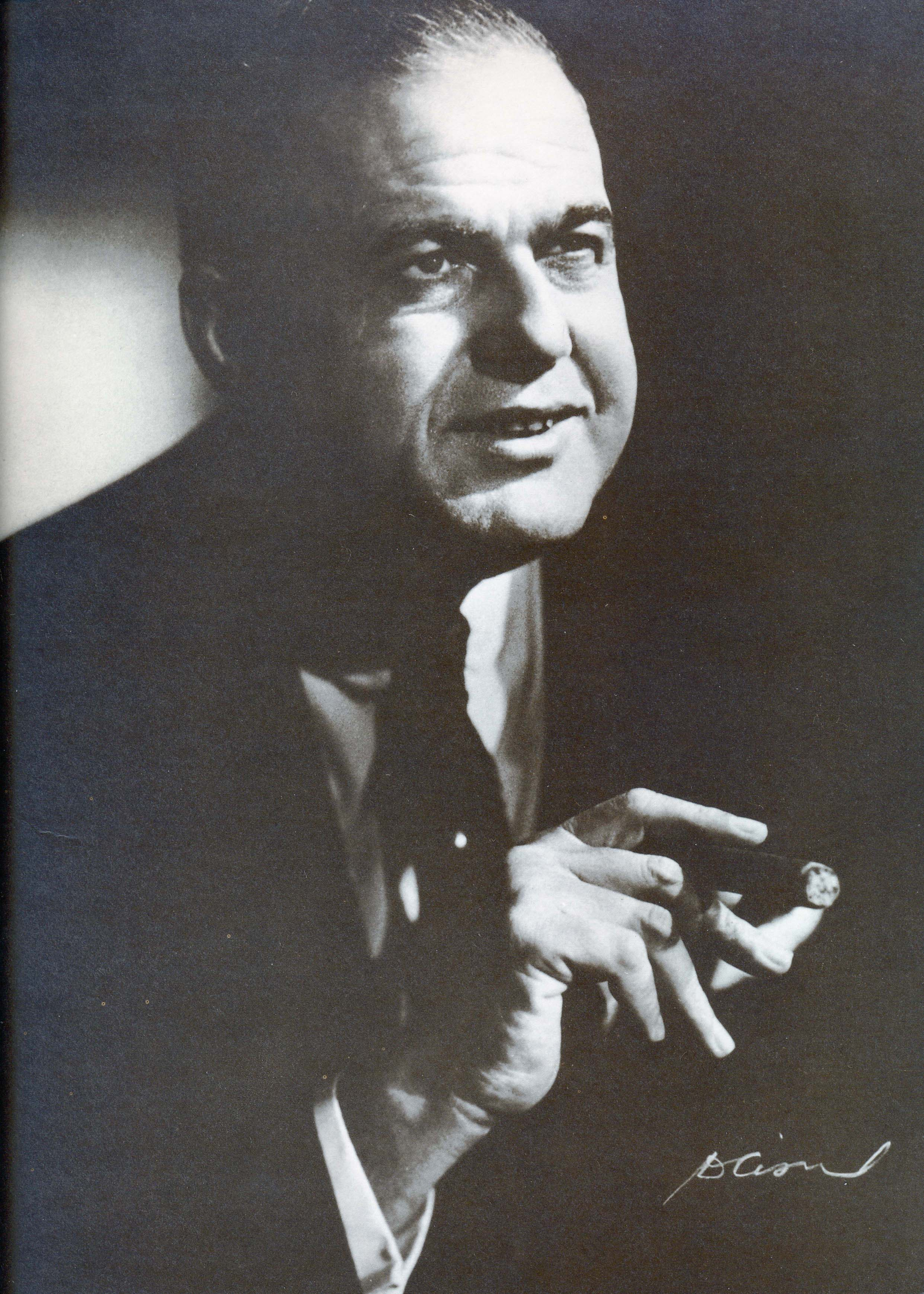
- Born: Diego Jesús Jiménez de Cisneros y Bermúdez; September 27, 1911; Havana, Cuba
- Died: July 15, 1980 (aged 68); Caracas, Venezuela
- Occupation: Businessman
- Years active: 1928-1980
- Known for: Founder, Grupo Cisneros
- Spouse: Albertina Rendiles Martínez Cisneros
- Children: 10
- Parents: Diego Jiménez de Cisneros y Govantes (father); María Luisa Bermúdez Martínez (mother)

Diego Jesús Jiménez de Cisneros y Bermúdez (September 27, 1911 – July 15, 1980) was a Cuban–born Venezuelan businessman. He founded Grupo Cisneros.

== Early life ==
Cisneros was born in Havana, Cuba, to parents Diego Jiménez de Cisneros y Govantes, a Cuban dentist, and María Luisa Bermúdez Martínez, who was from Venezuela.

After his father's death in 1914, Cisneros and his mother and brother, Antonio José Cisneros, moved to Venezuela. They then moved to Port of Spain, Trinidad, where Cisneros' mother's family had relocated. While living in Trinidad, Cisneros attended primary and secondary school at Saint Mary's College, a school governed by the Roman Catholic Congregation of the Holy Ghost.

== Career ==
In 1928, Cisneros and his brother Antonio José Cisneros moved back to Venezuela.

In Caracas, Cisneros got a job at the Royal Bank of Canada because he was fluent in English. Shortly after getting that job, he began working at a dealership for Chrysler cars and International trucks.

In 1929, Cisneros and his brother founded D. Cisneros & Cia, a small material-transport business. The brothers then obtained a license to operate a bus route and transformed the dump truck business into a bus business. In time, the Cisneros brothers created a bus line made up of 400 buses.

In 1939, the Cisneros brothers sold the bus line. In 1939, D. Cisneros & Cia. began working with franchising rights in Venezuela, selling REO trucks, Hamilton Watch Company watches, and Norge appliances.

In 1940, the Cisneros brothers got the exclusive franchise to produce and sell Pepsi-Cola products in Venezuela. In 1944, D. Cisneros & Cia. founded Liquid Carbonic, a company that produced carbon dioxide and related products. In 1947, they became the exclusive representative for Studebaker cars in Venezuela.

In 1952, Cisneros founded Helados Club Ice Cream Company, later known as Helado Tio Rico, S.A., a Venezuelan ice cream business.

In 1953, the various businesses were integrated into one entity, incorporating both commercial and industrial activities, Grupo Cisneros.

The 1958 fall of Venezuelan president Marcos Pérez Jiménez, created many economic setbacks. This included one of Televisa's investments in Venezuela, Televisa (Venezuela) a.k.a. Televisión Venezolana Independiente SA, which went into bankruptcy.

In 1960, the President of Venezuela, Rómulo Betancourt, proposed that Cisneros purchase Televisa. Cisneros purchased Televisa, and began airing channel 27 on February 27, 1961, resuming uninterrupted transmissions on March 1, 1961. Cisneros re-branded Televisa (Venezuela) as Venevisión on 27 February 1961.

One of the last actions undertaken by Cisneros was the creation of the Cisneros Foundation in 1968, a non-profit organization whose objective is to support democratic values, stimulate private initiative and promote free market values.

In 1970, Diego Cisneros retired from the administration of the Cisneros Organization, then known as Diego Cisneros Organization, due to health problems.

== Personal life ==
In 1938, Cisneros married Albertina Rendiles Martínez Cisneros. They had 8 children: Diego Alberto Cisneros, Marión Cisneros, Carlos Enrique Cisneros, Gustavo Cisneros, Ricardo José Cisneros, Gerardo Javier Cisneros, Antonio José Cisneros, and Ana Cisneros. He had 2 additional children with Virginia Igonda: Vilma Susana Cisneros and Gabriel Marcelo Cisneros.

After having a severe stroke in 1970, which led to declining health, Cisneros died in Caracas on July 15, 1980.

== Honors ==
The main avenue of the sector Los Ruices in Caracas bears his name.
