= Los secretos de Lucía =

- Created by: Jörg Hiller
- Starring: Irán Castillo; Juan Pablo Raba; Maritza Bustamante; Julián Gil; Plutarco Haza; Roberto Escobar; Luis Gerónimo Abreu; Yul Bürkle; Mimí Lazo; Ivan Tamayo; Aroldo Betancourt
- Opening theme: "Tengo un Secreto" by Chino & Nacho
- Countries of origin: Venezuela; Colombia; United States
- Original language: Spanish
- No. of episodes: 75

Production
- Executive producer: Manuel Federico Fraíz-Grijalba
- Production locations: Caracas, Venezuela; Bogotá, Colombia; Miami, United States
- Camera setup: Multi-camera
- Production companies: Venevisión; BE-TV; Venevision International; Univision Studios

Original release
- Network: Venevisión Plus
- Release: April 22 – August 4, 2014

Related
- El Señor de los Cielos

Los secretos de Lucía (Lucia's Secrets) is a Venezuelan telenovela produced by Venevisión with Univision Studios and BE-TV. The telenovela is an original story from Colombian writer Jorg Hiller.

Irán Castillo and Juan Pablo Raba are the main protagonists, and Julián Gil, Maritza Bustamante and Plutarco Haza are the main antagonists.

As of February 3, Cadenatres began broadcasting Los Secretos de Lucía at 8 pm. As of April 22, Venevisión Plus will be broadcasting Los Secretos de Lucía at 10 pm.

== Plot ==
In a hostile world full of violence unfolds the story of the beautiful Lucia, a woman fleeing without knowing why. A mysterious event left her amnesiac. All she knows is that she must escape from those who want to hurt her. Lucia never imagines that amid the frantic race that has become her life, she would meet Miguel, a young and handsome mechanic who, impressed by her beauty, decides to help her regardless of the consequences.

Love is not slow to appear and is their constant companion in the midst of a breathtaking escape. At times, flashes of memories emerge, and it's revealed that Lucia is the daughter of a vicious arms dealer and has been involved in the business and countless violent deaths.

Returning to that life would force Lucia to sacrifice Miguel's love for a path she knows is wrong, so she confronts it, wondering if there is still time to redeem herself.

Lucia and Miguel face dangerous adventures, where death is always lurking.

== Cast ==
- Irán Castillo as Lucia Reina
- Juan Pablo Raba as Miguel Gaitan
- Maritza Bustamante as Bonny Cabello
- Julián Gil as Robert Neville
- Plutarco Haza as Arsenio Reina
- Karina Velásquez as La India
- Roberto Escobar as Antonio Jaspe
- Luis Gerónimo Abreu as Ruben Olmedo
- Sissi Fleitas as Penelope
- Yul Bürkle as Pablo Zuleta
- María Dalmazzo as Patricia Gaitan
- Aroldo Betancourt as Oficial Ernesto Cardenas
- Iván Tamayo as Jean Carlos Aguirre "La Mole"
- Mimí Lazo as Alejandra Fuentes De La Reina
- Nacho Huett as Orejas (Oswaldo Orbajan)
- Pedro A. Rodriguez as Turista
- Albi De Abreu as La Llaga
- Judith Vásquez as Josefina Castro
- Carlos Guerrero as Lennox
- Claudia Rocafort as ATF Agent Moreno
