= Grupo Cisneros =

U.S.-based family owned conglomerate

Organización Cisneros S.A.
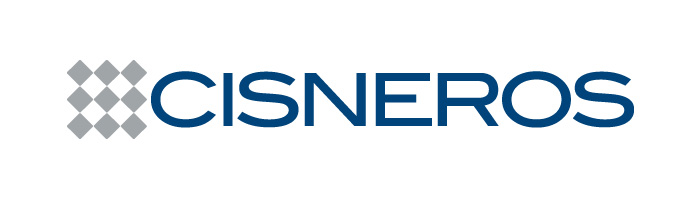
- Type: Private
- Industry: Media; Entertainment; Telecommunications; Consumer products; Real estate; Tourism
- Founded: 1929; 97 years ago as D. Cisneros & Cia. in Venezuela
- Founders: Diego Cisneros; Antonio José Cisneros
- Headquarters: Coral Gables, Florida, U.S.; Caracas, Venezuela
- Area served: United States; Venezuela; Spain; Dominican Republic; Colombia; Peru; Ecuador; Chile; China
- Key people: Adriana Cisneros (CEO)
- Number of employees: 800 (2023)
- Subsidiaries: Venevisión; VePlus; Cisneros Media Distribution; Venevisión International Productions; Venevision Studios; Claxson Interactive Group; Miss Venezuela; Miss Universe Philippines; Venemusic; Siente Music; RedMas; Cuponidad; Digitel; Tropicalia; SAECA Travel and Tourism; Fisa Laboratories; Americatel
- Website: cisneros.com

Grupo Cisneros is a privately held, family owned business headquartered in Coral Gables, Florida, historically based in Venezuela, with a focus on Latin American and Spanish-speaking people worldwide. It is a conglomerate of media entertainment, digital media, property investment, tourism development and consumer product companies which reaches 550 million Spanish and Portuguese-speaking consumers in the Americas and Europe. It also provides media content to more than 100 countries. Its current CEO is Adriana Cisneros.

== History ==
=== D. Cisneros & Cia.: 1929–1953 ===
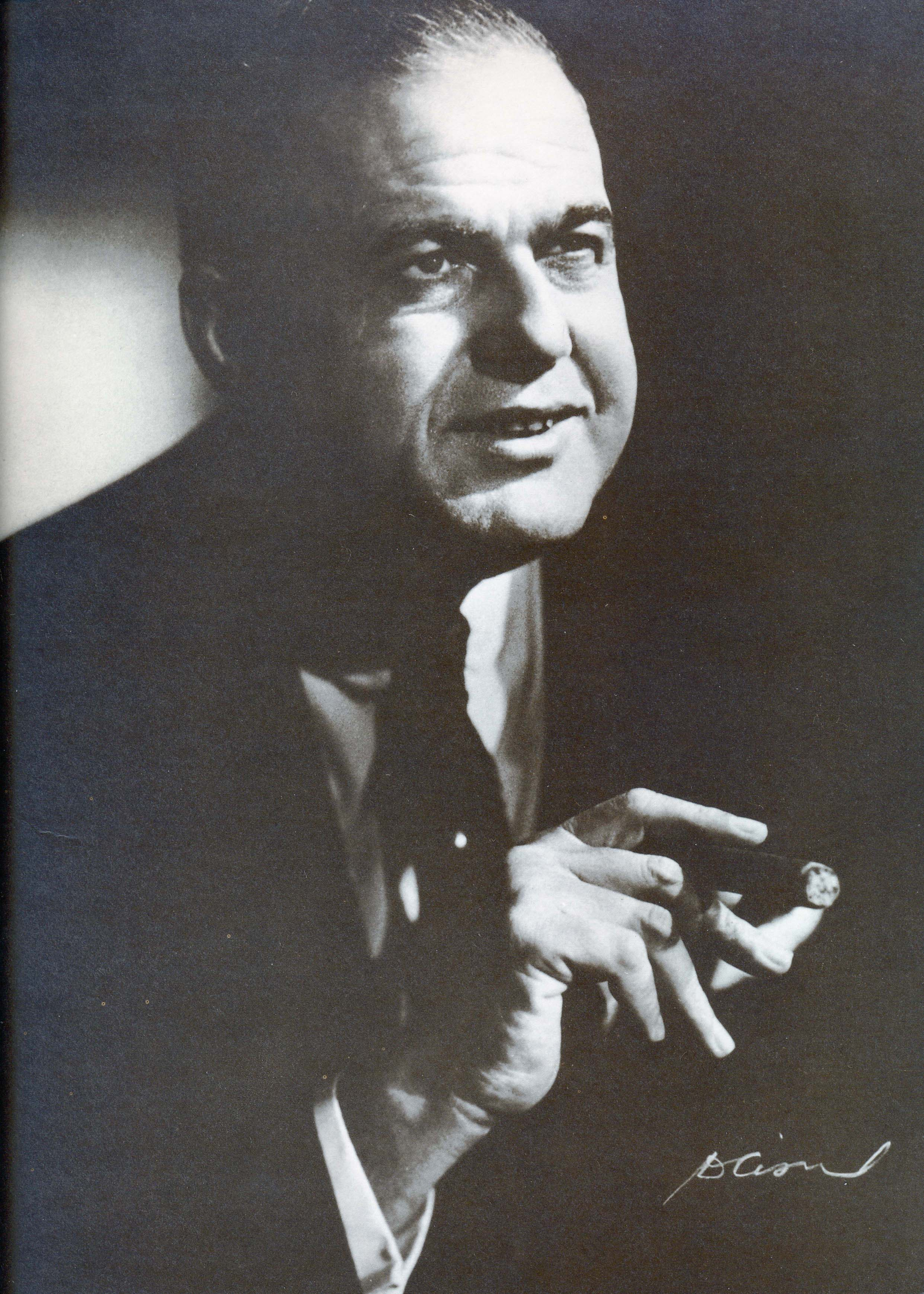
Diego Cisneros, founder of the Cisneros Group of Companies

Grupo Cisneros was founded in 1929 in Venezuela by Diego Cisneros and his elder brother Antonio José Cisneros as a small material transport business called D. Cisneros & Cia. The brothers then obtained a license to operate a bus route and transformed the dump truck business into a bus business. In time, the Cisneros brothers created a bus line made up of 400 buses, which they sold in 1939.

In 1939, D. Cisneros & Cia. became an exclusive franchiser for Norge, Hamilton Watch Company, and REO Truck brands in Venezuela. In 1940, rapid growth led to the acquisition of the exclusive license manufacture and bottling concession of Pepsi-Cola products in Venezuela, which established the company's fortune. In 1944, the company founded Liquid Carbonic, which produced carbon dioxide as well as other beverage products.

In 1947, D. Cisneros & Cia. went on to represent the car maker, Studebaker, in Venezuela, and in 1952 founded Helados Club Ice Cream Company, which was later renamed Helados Tio Rico, S.A., and was known as Tio Rico ice cream, and became the country's largest ice cream maker.

=== Cisneros Group of Companies: 1953–1970 ===
In 1953, D. Cisneros & Cia. consolidated its commercial and industrial entities under one corporate structure, which was called the Cisneros Group of Companies.

In 1968, the company founded Gaveplast, a company that produced plastic crates and cases for retail businesses for the beer and carbonated soft drink industries in South America.

=== Venevisión: 1961 ===
The 1958 fall of Venezuelan president Marcos Pérez Jiménez, created many economic setbacks. This included the sale of the then-only privately owned channel in Venezuela, TeleVisa a.k.a. Televisión Venezolana Independiente SA, which went into bankruptcy. In 1960, the President of Venezuela, Rómulo Betancourt, proposed that Cisneros purchase TeleVisa. Cisneros purchased TeleVisa, and began airing channel 27 on February 27, 1961, resuming uninterrupted transmissions on March 1, 1961. Cisneros re-branded TeleVisa as Venevisión on February 27, 1961.

=== Cisneros Group of Companies: 1970–2013 ===
In 1970, when Diego Cisneros had a stroke, leadership of the company was transferred to two of his sons. In February 1970, Ricardo José Cisneros became Chief Operating Officer of Cisneros, and in March 1970, Gustavo Cisneros, only recently graduating from college, assumed the position of chairman and chief executive officer of Grupo Cisneros.

=== Univision: 1992–2007 ===
In 1992, as part of a consortium of American businessman Jerry Perenchio, Mexican entrepreneur Emilio Azcárraga Milmo, and Grupo Cisneros bought Univision for $500 million. Grupo Cisneros held a 25% stake in Univision and 12.5% stake in the Univision Communications (now TelevisaUnivision). The Grupo Cisneros' ownership of stake in Univision led to the broadcast of Venevision telenovelas from Venezuela, & eventually, to the co-production partnership of Venevision International and Univision Communications of telenovelas. The consortium ended up selling Univision for $13.7 billion in 2007.

=== DirecTV Latin America/Vrio: 1995–present ===
In 1995, Grupo Cisneros partnered with Hughes Electronics Corporation to provide all-digital direct-to-home satellite television service throughout Latin America.

=== Grupo Cisneros: 2013–present ===
In August 2013, Gustavo Cisneros appointed daughter Adriana Cisneros de Griffin as the new chief executive officer of Grupo Cisneros. Adriana had previously spent five years working as Vice President of Strategy.

== Current activity ==
The creation of Venevision International (currently Cisneros Media Distribution), which handles the distribution, marketing and production of entertainment content, significantly increased the international scope of the conglomerate's operations. Cisneros Media Distribution is currently one of the main programming suppliers for Univision, the leading Spanish-language television network in the United States.

In 2011, Grupo Cisneros established joint ventures with Chinese partners.

In November 2016, Adriana Cisneros Interactive started a partnership with Facebook Latin America to be its exclusive reseller in Latin American countries including Peru, Paraguay, Ecuador, Peru and Bolivia.

As of 2019, Grupo Cisneros is the last independent media outlet in Venezuela.

== Companies ==
The companies belonging to Cisneros include majority and minority stock interests in several corporations that are managed both directly or indirectly through partnerships, risk-sharing companies or alliances. Cisneros' companies are grouped into the following corporate divisions:

=== Cisneros Media ===
Cisneros' business unit, which includes its television broadcasting, production, content distribution, music and beauty contest companies.

==== Free-to-air and paid television channels ====
- Venevisión largest television network in Venezuela, Its free-to-air signal covers entire the country.

==== Paid television channels ====
- Venevisión Plus: A subscription channel distributed internationally that offers 250 hours a month of programming in Spanish. Venevisión Plus is currently present throughout Latin America in its various feeds
- Ve Plus TV: Formerly known as Novelísima, Ve Plus TV is a soap opera and entertainment channel with diverse programming such as talk shows, variety shows and comedy programs.
- VmasTV: Subscription entertainment channel directed to Colombian audiences, with various genres and formats, such as: drama, reality shows, comedy, and contests

==== Content and distribution ====
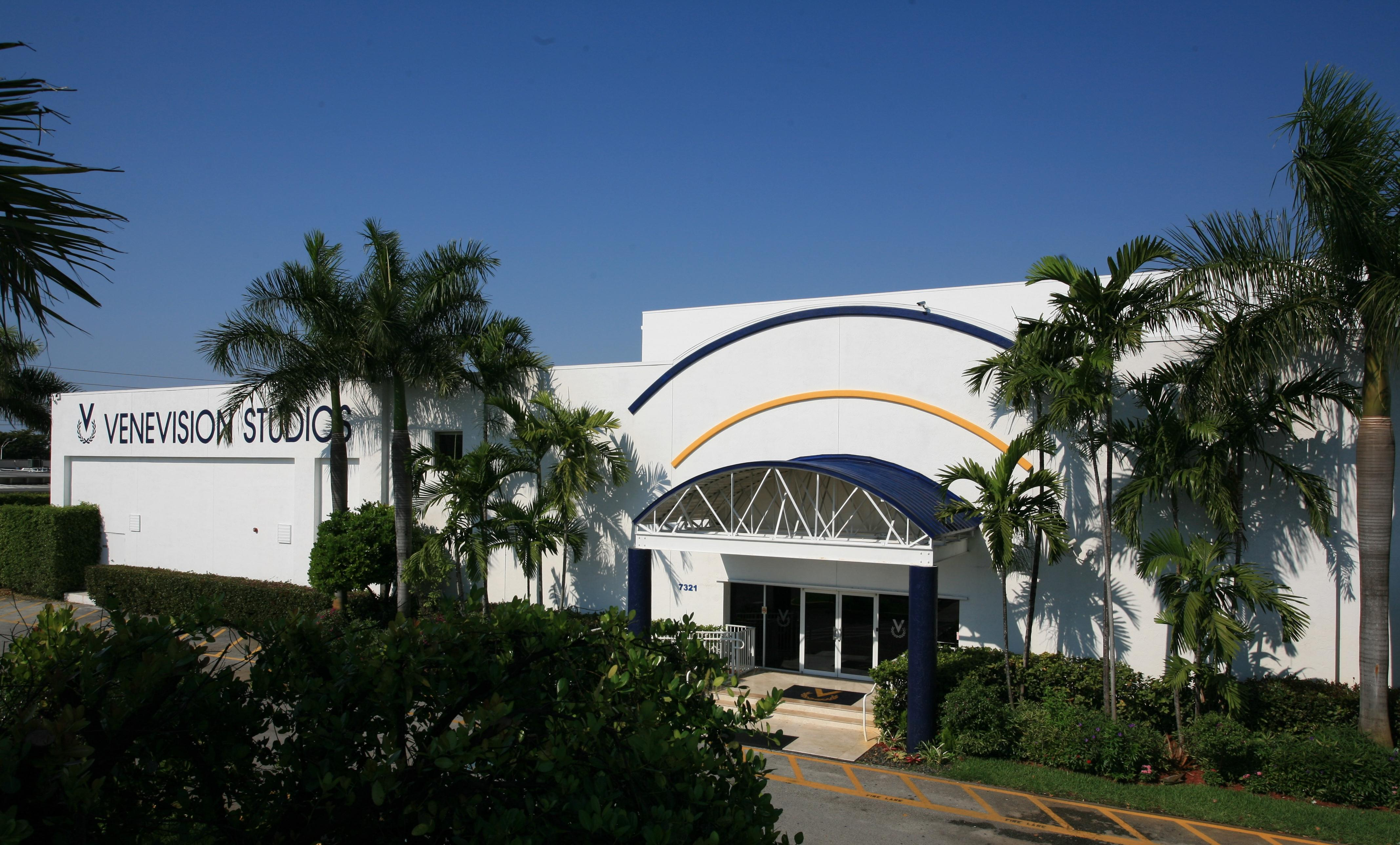
Venevisión Studios in Miami

- Cisneros Media Distribution: Formerly known as Venevisión International, Cisneros Media Distribution is an entertainment company with more than 30 years’ experience in Spanish content distribution produced by Cisneros and other companies.
- Venevisión Productions: The largest independent Hispanic production company in the United States. Its programming is distributed internationally to over 90 countries around the world.
- Venevisión Studios: A facility for the production of television programming. It has six studios consisting of over 26,000 square meters, digital cameras, digital AES, which has the ability to produce programs for high-definition.

==== Entertainment and music ====
- Miss Venezuela: The Miss Venezuela beauty pageant is now a multimedia event. During the Interactive Gala, the public can vote for their preferred candidate through social media networks. In 2013, the Miss Venezuela contest partnered with CIC Media and Sony Entertainment to create a reality show titled “Todo por la Corona” [All For the Crown] which was broadcast throughout Latin America by Univision. Similarly, in 2013 it partnered with P&G to create pan-regional product and works with 30 brands.
- VeneMusic: A record label belonging to Venevisión International, which produces, promotes and distributes Latin music from various genres, including television theme songs from Cisneros TV productions.
- Siente Music: A joint venture between Vene Music and Universal Music Latino, the award-winning division of Universal Music Group.

=== Cisneros Interactive ===
A corporate division of Cisneros develops digital businesses for Hispanic audiences in the United States and Latin America. Its business strategy is focused on two main areas: digital advertisement, both online and mobile, and e-commerce. Its main companies are:

- RedMas: One of the main Hispanic mobile ad networks and mobile studio. It offers its current and potential clients mobile design and development strategies for building mobile web sites in HTML5 and mobile applications for different operating systems such as Android, IOs, Windows, Symbian and tablets.
- Adsmovil: The main mobile publicity network in the Hispanic communications market in the U.S. and the Spanish and Portuguese-speaking markets in Latin America.
- Cuponidad: is a e-commerce website with daily sales offers in Peru and Venezuela. The former Colombian division filed for bankruptcy in 2015.

=== Cisneros Real Estate ===
Cisneros' real estate division is in charge of developing and positioning the company's real estate investments which include commercial, industrial and residential properties located in various countries.

- Tropicalia: is a tourism real-estate development belonging to Cisneros. It is located in the El Seibo Province of the Dominican Republic. Tropicalia is a long-term sustainable project involving thousands of coastal hectares in the southern costs of the Samana Bay. The project includes a Four Seasons Hotels and Resorts hotel that was designed by the Brazilian architect Isay Weinfeld with a golf course that was designed by Tom Doak.

=== Consumer Products and Services ===
- SAECA Viajes y Turismo: is a corporate level travel agencies in Venezuela. It offers delivery of tickets and traveler assistance in 125 countries, access to the online Sabre reservations system and call center service in the United States, Europe and Latin America.
- Laboratorios Fisa: manufactures and distributes personal beauty products and cosmetics in Venezuela. Its manufacturing lines includes hair care, soaps and deodorants, skin care products and fragrances for men and women.
- Americatel: Founded in April 1993, Americatel Sistemas de Comunicación C.A. is a long-distance telecommunications company. It offers corporate clients in Venezuela a "trunking" communication service, employing technology developed by Motorola, Inc. that allows a large number of users to share a relatively small number of communication paths. Americatel's service is currently offered in Caracas, La Guaira, Maracay, Valencia, Puerto Ordaz and Maturín.

== See also ==
- List of Cisneros entities
