= TeleVisa =

First private television station in Venezuela

Wordmark

TeleVisa, officially known as the Televisión Independiente, S.A. became the first privately owned television station to begin operations in Venezuela. It was the second television station to begin operations after the state-owned Televisora Nacional. In 1960, Televisa was purchased by Diego Cisneros and re-branded as Venevisión and became in business' Cisneros family.

Despite the two stations having the same name, the station isn't related in any form to the Mexican telecommunications and broadcasting company Televisa, as the name of Mexican media network stands for Televisión Vía Satélite.

== History ==
On the evening of March 4, 1953, Televisa (call sign YVLV-TV, channel four), began its testing phase. Its owner was the Venezuelan broadcaster, Gonzalo Veloz Mancera.

On 30 March, Televisa was officially inaugurated, and as a result of the respective commercial concession which the national government had assigned the company, according to the second article of the Regalement of Radiocommunications, it opened up the airwaves for other commercial television stations in Venezuela. Televisa transmitted between 4 and 12 p.m.

On 1 July, Veloz Mancera put into place Televisa's regular programming, which remained on the air until mid-1960, when its installations were acquired by the Corporación Venezolana de Televisión, a subsidiary of the Grupo Cisneros.

On Sunday, 9 August 1953, this station broadcast, for the first time in Venezuela, a horse race, which was narrated by Luis Plácido Pisarello.

In 1956, months before Radio Caracas Televisión installed their antenna in Pariata, Televisa had already begun service to what is now the State of Vargas on channel nine, from an antenna located in Cabo Blanco.

Also created by Veloz Mancera, on 5 May 1956, the inaugural act of the first regional television station in Venezuela took place: Televisa del Zulia, which operated from Maracaibo. Two days later, Televisa del Zulia began its regular transmissions in the afternoon hours and lasted until 11:00 p.m. In the beginning, it was an independent station, but after a while, it became an affiliate of Televisa in Caracas. Accompanying Veloz Mancera, investors in the company included Claudio Gerardini and Luiggi Ilicetto.

In 1960, the President of Venezuela, Rómulo Betancourt, proposed to Diego Cisneros that he purchase Televisa, which had already declared bankruptcy. Cisneros accepted Betancourt's offer, and after purchasing Televisa, he re-branded it as Venevisión on 27 February 1961.

== See also ==
- List of Venezuelan over-the-air television networks and stations
- Gustavo Cisneros
- Venevisión
