= Cisneros Media =

Spanish-language media company

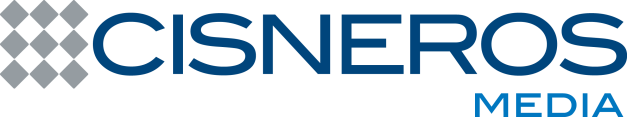
- Industry: Media
- Predecessor: Venevision International
- Founded: 1970; 56 years ago
- Founder: Diego Cisneros
- Headquarters: Miami, Florida, United States; Caracas, Venezuela
- Area served: Worldwide
- Key people: Adriana Cisneros (CEO); Jonathan Blum (President)
- Parent: Grupo Cisneros
- Subsidiaries: Venevisión; VePlus; Venevisión International Productions; Venevision Studios; Venemusic; Siente Music; RedMas
- Website: www.cisnerosmediadist.com

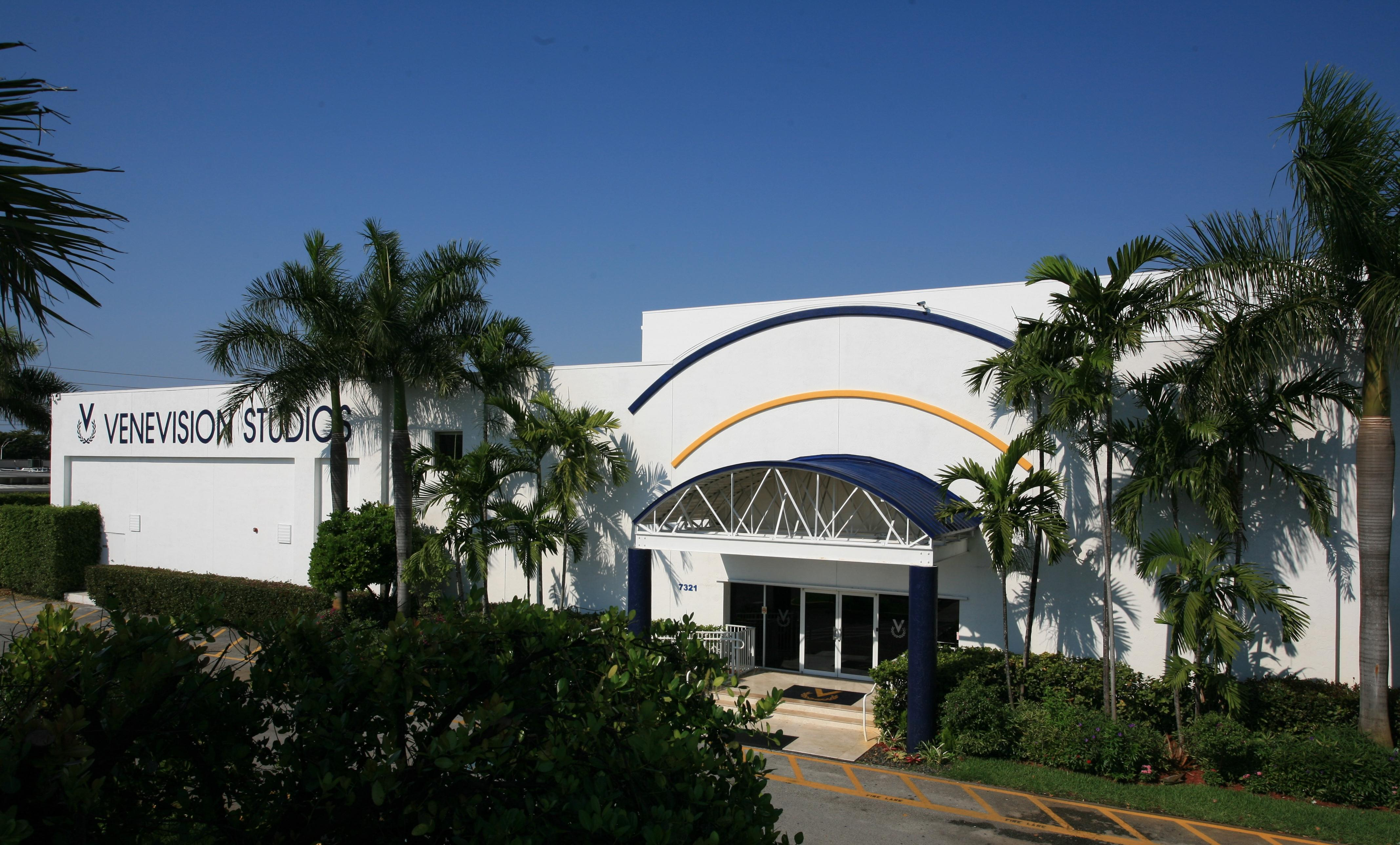
Offices of Cisneros Media Studios in Miami.

Cisneros Media (CMD), also known as Venevision International (VVI), is an American-based entertainment company that broadcasts Spanish-language television worldwide.

== History ==
Venevision International is part of the Cisneros Group of Companies. It was founded initially as the distribution company.

CMD is currently headed by Peter Tinoco. The company opened its doors in 1969 under the name Teverama Florida, along with Radio Caracas Television as distributors of Venezuelan programming abroad. After a split from RCTV (which formed Coral Pictures), it was renamed America Television Inc. In 1987, the company took the current name of Venevision International.

VVI is one of the two largest companies that distributes Spanish-language television programming. The company has a diverse programming catalogue, with an emphasis on the telenovela genre.

In 1992, as part of a consortium of American businessman Jerry Perenchio, Mexican entrepreneur Emilio Azcárraga Milmo, and Grupo Cisneros through Venevisión International bought Univision for $500 million. Grupo Cisneros held a 25% stake in Univision and 12.5% stake in the Univision Communications (now TelevisaUnivision). The Grupo Cisneros' ownership stake in Univision led to the broadcast of Venevision telenovelas from Venezuela, and to the co-production of telenovelas by the partnership of Venevision International and Univision Communications. The consortium ended up selling Univision for $13.7 billion in 2007.

VVI presently supports exchange agreements and sales of TV programming in China and South Korea, where telenovelas are popular. Beginning in 2000, the company sought to diversify its catalogue with original productions, and to participate in the profitable Hispanic market in the United States.

In television production, CMD was a pioneer in independent television production in Spanish in the city of Miami and one of the main companies of this segment in the industry.

CMD founded the first exclusive, Spanish-language film distribution company in the United States. It released movies in cinemas and on pay-per-view, pay television, home video, the hospitality industry (hotels and tourism) and the Internet. It has participated in a renewed interest in Latin American cinema in the US market.

As part of the Cisneros Group of Companies, the company has been launched TV channels. Based on its film catalogue in Spanish, the company launched its pay TV movie channel "VeneMovies" in 2006: a channel that programs films 24 hours a day, along with interviews and coverage of major festivals targeted towards the United States' Hispanic market.

VVI runs Latcel, a mobile content production and distribution company in the U.S. Hispanic market. It also runs VeneMobile, a division that offers content from the Cisneros Group of Companies in the mobile markets.

CMD has also participated with the Spanish company Nostromo in television programming and in the production of theater plays in the city of Miami where it owned a theatre from 2001 through 2005.

On October 28, 2013, the Grupo Cisneros relaunched the Venevisión International brand with the name Cisneros Media, as part of a restructuring of the Grupo Cisneros. Cisneros Media is a division that controls entertainment services:

- Venevisión: Venezuela's leading television network.
- Ve Plus: international television channel.
- Miss Venezuela Organization: production platform aimed at the female audience.
- Cisneros Media Distribution - Global distributor of entertainment content.
- Venevisión International Productions and Cisneros Studios – independent producer of Venevisión's Spanish-language programming in the United States and for Venevisión.

In 2016, the company represented Boat Rocker Media titles in Latin America.

== Cisneros Media Distribution companies ==
Production and distribution logo

Venevision International TV Distribution

Venevisión International is one of the largest television programming distribution companies in Latin America. The catalogue includes popular genres from Venezuela, Mexico, the Dominican Republic, Peru, Colombia, and Brazil. It features films from Hollywood, Spain, and Latin America. Genres include telenovelas, musicals, comedies, game shows, talk shows, children's programming and documentaries.

Venevision International Pay TV

VVI Pay TV develops Spanish-language channels for cable and Satellite television broadcasts. The ViendoMovies channel division offers contemporary movies in Spanish in the United States.

Venevision International Film Distribution

The film division of VVI distributes and markets Spanish-language films through pay-per-view, video-on-demand, Internet broadband, hotel and airline systems, and DVDs. This division also publishes compilations of soap operas and other television programs on DVD.

Venevision International Productions

The programming producer for Venevisión International generates productions of various genres. Its facilities are located in Miami and with regional associates. The company also develops programs for television shows.

Venevision International Publishing

Venevisión International Publishing protects and manages the intellectual property rights of music and productions of the Cisneros Organization.

== Ve Plus TV ==
Ve Plus
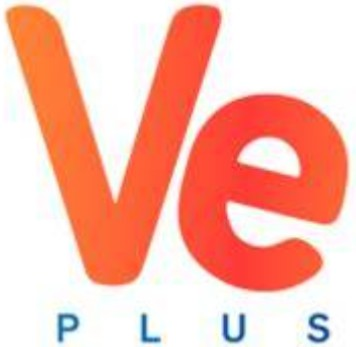
- Type: Cable Television Network
- Country: Venezuela
- Broadcast area: United States; Latin America; Venezuela; Spain; Philippines

Programming
- Picture format: 1080i HDTV (downscaled to 480i/576i for the SD feed)

Ownership
- Owner: Grupo Cisneros
- Parent: Cisneros Media
- Sister channels: Venevisión; Novelisima

History
- Launched: August 28, 2000; 26 years ago
- Founder: Gustavo Cisneros
- Former names: Venevisión Continental; Venevisión Plus

VePlus is a subscription channel owned by Cisneros Media and serves as an updated version of their previous channel, Venevisión Continental. It was also known as Novelísima, Ve Plus TV and V Mas TV, a subsidiary of Grupo Cisneros. VePlus incorporates much of the programming from Venevisión Continental and Novelísima, while also producing its own content in Venezuela and Miami.

=== History ===
Venevisión Continental was originally launched as a cable television station on August 28, 2000. It provided entertainment programs, news, talk shows, and soap operas, catering to Spanish-speaking audiences in Venezuela, Latin America, Asia and Europe as the international signal of Venevisión. The channel ceased its broadcasts in July 2008. It was available on DirecTV channel 774 until September 2006 and was owned by Venezuela's Venevisión Canal.

In December 2007, the Cisneros Group initiated a pilot project called Venevisión Novelísima Plus in Venezuela. Recognizing its success and large viewership, Venevisión Continental was relaunched in June 2008 under the name Novelísima. The channel focused on soap operas, telenovelas, Latin entertainment, talk shows, and contests, while excluding opinion, politics, and news media.

On July 18, 2012, the signals of "Novelísima" and "Venevisión Plus Dominicana" were merged to create "Ve Plus TV". In 2017, the channel was rebranded as VePlus.

=== Feeds ===
VePlus operates on three different feeds:

1. VePlus: Broadcasts in Latin America, Spain and the Philippines, excluding Venezuela.
2. VePlus: Exclusive feed for Venezuela.
3. VePlus: Available in the United States.

=== Programming ===
VePlus primarily offers a lineup of soap operas, talk shows, and variety shows, targeting Hispanic and Latino audiences in the United States and other countries.

=== Venevision Continental ===
Venevision Continental serves as the business unit responsible for managing pay-TV channels and services for Cisneros.

== Novelas ==
Title	Production Year	Production Countries	Production Companies	Number of Episodes	Airdates
Club 57	2019–2021	United States	Rainbow S.r.l. Viacom International Media Networks; Mediapro; Nickelodeon	120	April 15, 2019 – October 22, 2021
Ruta 35	2015	United States	Venevision International; BE-TV; Univision Studios	65	January 12, 2016 – February 26, 2016
Voltea pa' que te enamores	2014–2015	United States	Venevision International; Univision Studios	123	November 11, 2014 – March 15, 2015
Demente criminal	2014	United States	Venevision International; Univision Studios	50	April 1 – August 15, 2015
Cosita linda	2013–2014	United States	Venevision International; Univision Studios	146	September 22, 2014 – May 1, 2015
Los Secretos de Lucía	2013	Venezuela; Colombia; United States	Venevisión; BE-TV; Venevision International; Univision Studios	75	April 22 – August 4, 2014
Rosario	2012–2013	United States	Venevision International; Univision Studios	105 / 145	January 28 – August 16, 2013
El talismán	2012	United States	Venevision International; Univision Studios	98 / 100	January 30 – June 15, 2012
Corazón apasionado	2011	United States; Venezuela	Venevision International	79 / 111	April 9 – July 27, 2012
Eva Luna	2010–2011	United States	Venevision International; Univision Studios	110 / 114	November 1, 2010 – April 11, 2011
Sacrificio de mujer	2010	United States; Venezuela	Venevision International	101	April 18 – July 7, 2011
Condesa por amor	2009	Dominican Republic	Venevision International	100	October 26, 2009 – February 11, 2010
Pecadora	2009–2010	United States; Venezuela	Venevision International	80 / 145	3 May – September 10, 2010
Águila roja	2009–2016	Spain	Globomedia; RTVE	116	February 19, 2009 – October 26, 2016
Vuélveme a querer	2008–2009	Mexico	TV Azteca; Venevision International	139	February 9 – August 21, 2009
Alma indomable	2008–2009	United States; Venezuela	Venevision International	165	October 19, 2009 – April 16, 2010
Valeria	2008	United States; Venezuela	Venevision International	174	March 10 – October 16, 2009
Pobre Millionaria	2008	Panama; Venezuela	Venevision International	97	May 15 – August 26, 2008
Amor Comprado	2007	United States; Venezuela	Venevision International; Univision Studios	123	January 21 – July 11, 2008
Trópico	2007	Dominican Republic	Venevisión International; Iguana Productions; Antena Latina	100	June 4 – September 14, 2007
Acorralada	2006–2007	United States; Venezuela	Venevision International; Univision Studios	187	January 15 – October 5, 2007
Mi Vida Eres Tú	2006	United States; Venezuela	Venevision International	116	July 10 – December 8, 2006
Olvidarte jamás	2005	United States; Venezuela	Venevision International; Univision Studios	118	January 9 – June 7, 2006
Soñar no cuesta nada	2004–2005	United States; Venezuela	Venevision International	191	May 23, 2005 – February 23, 2006
Ángel rebelde	2003–2004	United States; Venezuela	Fonovideo Productions; Venevisión	217	February 2 – December 3, 2004
Rebeca	2003	United States; Venezuela	Fonovideo Productions; Venevisión	152	June 2 – December 26, 2003
Gata salvaje	2002	United States; Venezuela	Fonovideo Productions; Venevisión	252	May 16, 2002 – May 2, 2003
Secreto de amor	2001	United States; Venezuela	Fonovideo Productions; Venevisión	151	July 24, 2001 – February 12, 2002
La revancha	2000	United States; Venezuela	Fonovideo Productions; Venevisión	151	8 May – December 1, 2000
Girasoles para Lucía	1999–2000	Peru	Venevision International; Iguana Productions	110	November 8, 1999 – March 31, 2000
Enamorada	1999–2000	United States; Venezuela	Fonovideo Productions; Venevisión	100	November 8, 1999 – March 8, 2000
La mujer de mi vida	1998–1999	United States; Venezuela	Fonovideo Productions; Venevisión	150	September 23, 1998 – March 17, 1999

== English-Language Series ==
- Ned's Declassified School Survival Guide 2005
- Zoey 101 2005
- Flashpoint 2009
- Corazones extremos 2010
- No Puede Ser 2010
- What's Up Warthogs! 2011
- Hawaii Five-0 2012
- Beauty & the Beast 2012
- Just Kidding 2013
- Scorpion 2015
- The Messengers 2015
- Limitless 2015
- Killjoys 2015
- Zoo 2015
- The Next Step 2016
- Extant 2016
- MacGyver 2017
- Seal Team 2018
- FBI 2018

== English-Language Cartoons ==
- Zoofari 2018
- Bitz & Bob 2019
- The Strange Chores 2020
- Kingdom Force 2020
- Remy & Boo 2021
- Dino Ranch 2021
- Zumbar 2021
- Dino Pops 2023

== Programs ==
- La Guerra De Los Sexos
- Súper Sábado Sensacional
- ¡Qué Locura!

== Talkshows ==
- Casos De Familia
- ¿Quién Tiene La Razón?
- Mujeres Con Historias Y Hombres Hambién
