= Gustavo Cisneros =

Venezuelan media mogul (1945–2023)

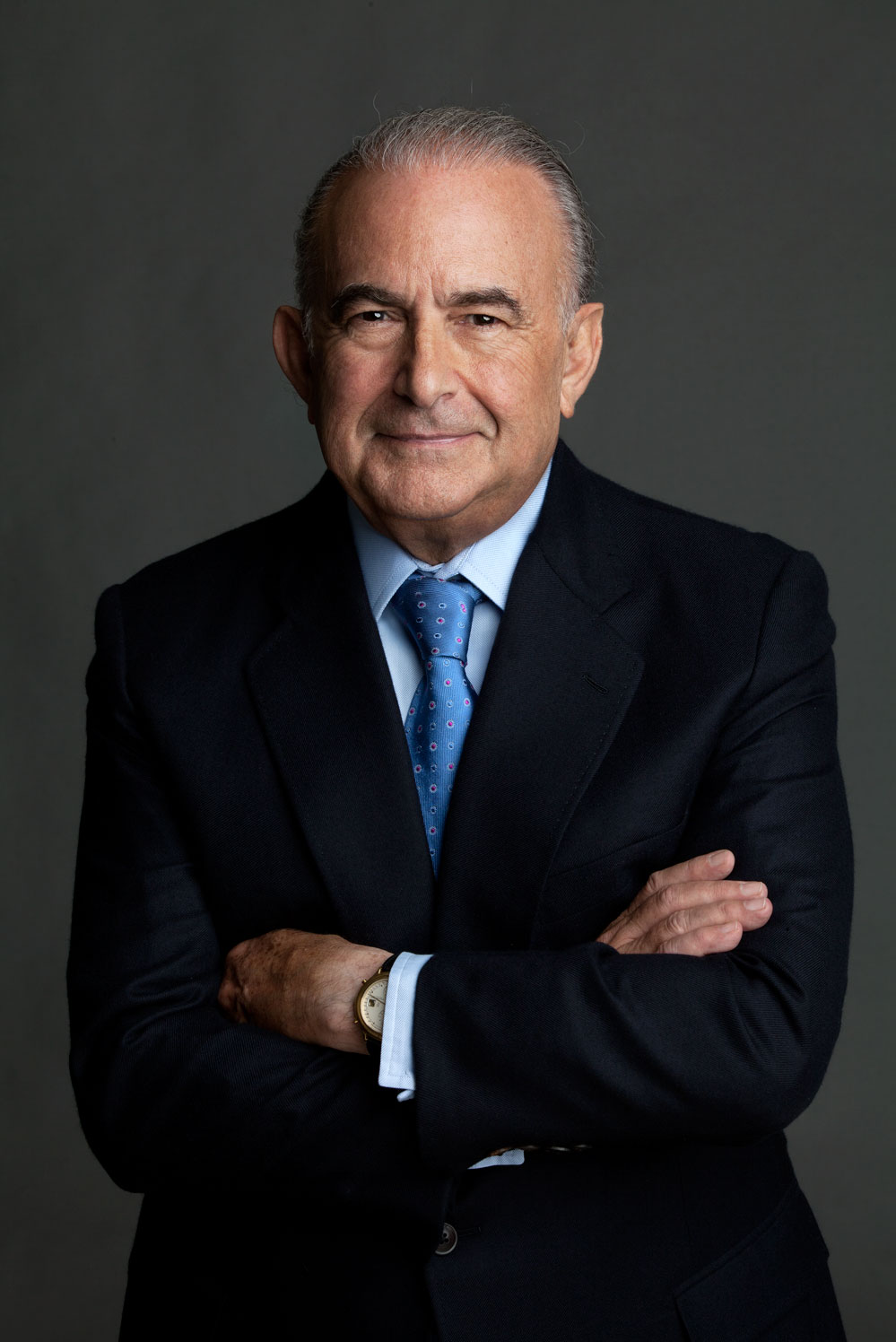
- Born: Gustavo Alfredo Jiménez de Cisneros y Rendiles; 1 June 1945; Caracas, Venezuela
- Died: 29 December 2023 (aged 78); New York City, US
- Citizenship: Venezuela; Dominican Republic; Spain; U.S.
- Education: Babson College
- Occupation: Media mogul
- Spouse: Patricia Phelps
- Children: 3, including Adriana Cisneros

Gustavo Alfredo Jiménez de Cisneros y Rendiles (1 June 1945 – 29 December 2023) was a Venezuelan businessman and Chairman of Grupo Cisneros.

A onetime billionaire, according to Forbes, his net worth peaked at US$6.0 billion in 2007 (equivalent to $8.7 billion in 2024 prices when adjusted for inflation); he dropped off the billionaires' list in 2020 as a consequence of his Venezuelan assets losing value due to the long economic crisis in Venezuela.

== Early life and education ==
Cisneros was born on 1 June 1945, the son of Diego Cisneros and Albertina Cisneros (née Rendíles Martínez).

Cisneros's father, Diego Cisneros, was in business in Caracas from 1929 and received the Pepsi concession for Venezuela in 1940, before going on to gain the concession for private TV channel Venevisión in 1961. The Cisneros family was the wealthiest in South America on the 2006 Forbes ranking.

Cisneros graduated from Suffield Academy in Connecticut in 1963. He graduated from Babson College in Massachusetts in 1968.

== Grupo Cisneros ==
Grupo Cisneros is one of the largest privately held media entertainment organizations in the world. The company has been headquartered in Coral Gables, Florida, since 2000.

Cisneros became President of Grupo Cisneros when he was 25 years old.

Cisneros's wealth came from his holdings in media, entertainment, telecommunications, and consumer products companies. Grupo Cisneros is one of the largest privately held Spanish-language media and entertainment companies.

Until the buyout of Univision, the United States’ leading Spanish-language television network, Cisneros was one of the biggest shareholders of the company. He also owned Venevision International, which produces and distributes media and entertainment products throughout the world, and Venevisión, a Venezuelan television network. Since 1980 the group has owned the Miss Venezuela contest and since 2001 also the Leones del Caracas baseball team.

Long an advocate of free enterprise Cisneros for many years expanded his operations outside of Venezuela and into overseas markets, including the U.S., Spain, and later China.

In August 2013, Gustavo Cisneros appointed his daughter Adriana Cisneros de Griffin as the new Chief Executive Officer (CEO) of Cisneros.

Before his death, Cisneros was developing Tropicalia, a multibillion-dollar resort in Miches, 80 kilometres (50 mi) northwest of Punta Cana, Dominican Republic. Its opening is scheduled for 2026.

Cisneros was listed among the world's richest men, according to Forbes magazine, which estimated his fortune at US$1.1 billion in 2019. His wealth decreased from its 2014 secondary peak of US$ 4.4 billion, and its 2007 primary peak of US$ 6.0 billion.

== Politics ==
Although Cisneros and Hugo Chávez were originally friends and Cisneros contributed to Chávez's first presidential campaigns, Cisneros was accused of involvement in the 2002 Venezuelan coup d'état attempt against Chávez after their relationship became strained because of Chávez's confrontation with the media.

Cisneros was questioned about his relationship with Chávez.

== Philanthropy ==
Cisneros supported two philanthropic entities: Colección Patricia Phelps de Cisneros and Fundación Cisneros.

Fundación Cisneros runs a wide range of educational and cultural programs aimed at improving the lives of Latin Americans. These include the AME program for professional development of Latin American educators, visual arts education and awareness based on the Colección Patricia Phelps de Cisneros; PPV, a visual thinking curriculum for Latin American school children, and traveling art exhibits showcasing the talents of Latin American artists for North America and European audiences.

Colección Patricia Phelps de Cisneros is a privately held Latin American art organization based in Venezuela and New York City. Patricia and Gustavo Cisneros began collecting Latin American abstraction after their marriage, in 1970. Over the years, it has grown to more than 2,000 pieces, including about 200 Spanish colonial objects. In addition, the couple has amassed a vast holding of ethnographic material from the Amazon. Based in New York and Caracas, the Colección Patricia Phelps de Cisneros today also includes works by Uruguay's Joaquín Torres-García, Brazil's Lygia Clark, and Venezuelan modern masters Jesús Rafael Soto, Alejandro Otero, and Carlos Cruz-Diez. The Cisneros Foundation was moving toward building a permanent institution in Caracas in the late 1990s until Hugo Chávez was elected president. In 2007, the foundation encountered resistance from the Chávez government when lending works by Venezuelan painter Armando Reverón (1889-1954) to New York's Museum of Modern Art for the museum's first retrospective devoted to a single Latin American artist in 50 years.

== Personal life ==
Cisneros was married to his wife, Patricia, from 1970 until his death. She has been a significant MoMA benefactor since 1992, has been a trustee of the museum and has made substantial cash contributions to the museum's recent renovation. Her name is on one of the institution's exhibition rooms. In addition to MoMA, the Los Angeles County Museum of Art, the Hammer Museum, Long Beach's Museum of Latin American Art, and the Museo Reina Sofía in Madrid also have received art loans. Phelps de Cisneros is an active member of the International Council and the Latin American Acquisitions Committee of Tate, London; she is an International Trustee of the Fundación Amigos del Museo del Prado, Madrid; belongs to the Association Centre Pompidou América Latina; the Museum Berggruen’s International Council; and the American Friends of the Fondation Beyeler, among others.

Cisneros lived in the Dominican Republic beginning in the 1990s.

In addition to Venezuelan citizenship, Cisneros also held United States, Spanish, and Dominican citizenship.

Through his father, Diego Cisneros's paternal side, Cisneros is related to Pablo de Hita y Salazar, who was the 27th Governor of La Florida from 1674 to 1680. As a tribute to his father, Cisneros published a book about the Cisneros family tree.

=== Death ===
On 29 December 2023, Gustavo Cisneros died in New York City, at the age of 78. Spanish newspaper El País reported that the cause of his death was pneumonia, a complication following a spinal surgery. The news was confirmed by Cisneros Media, the company owned by Cisneros, through a statement on social media. In the statement, they expressed deep sorrow over his death, describing him as a "visionary leader whose influence extended far beyond the business realm", known for his strategic vision and commitment to innovation.

== Commendations ==
- 1979: Orden Isabel la Católica, Grado Encomienda (1 collar, 1 medallita, 1 botón) – Spain
- 22 January 1999: Orden Nacional al Mérito, en el Grado de Oficial (3 medallas) – Ecuador
- 1980: Caballero de la Soberana Orden de Malta, Gracia Magistral (6 medallas, 2 botones, 1 prendedor, 2 cajitas rojas vacías, 2 cajitas azules vacías) – Italy
- 23 November 1982: Orden Mérito al Trabajo, Primera Clase (1 medalla. 1 botón) – Venezuela
- 1983: Orden Francisco de Miranda, Primera Clase (1 medalla, 1 botón) – Venezuela
- 1983: Orden Francisco de Miranda, Segunda Clase (1 medalla, 1 botón) – Venezuela
- 12 January 1984: Orden Andrés Bello, Banda de Honor (1 medalla, 1 botón) – Venezuela
- 16 May 1984: Orden Isabel la Católica, Grado Encomienda de Número (1 collar, 1 placa, 4 medallitas, 2 botones) – Spain
- 12 June 1984: Orden del Libertador, Gran Oficial, Segunda Clase (1 medalla, 1 botón – Venezuela
- December 1990: Orden del Libertador, Gran Cordón (2 medallas, 1 botón) – Venezuela
- 30 October 2004: Orden del Congreso de Colombia en el Grado de Oficial – Colombia
- 30 October 2004: Orden de la Democracia Simón Bolívar en el Grado de Gran Cruz – Colombia
- Orden Diego de Losada, Primera Clase (1 collar, 1 prendedor, 2 botones) – Venezuela
- Orden al Mérito del Ministerio Público, Primera Clase (1 collar, 1 medallita, 2 botones) – Venezuela
- Llave de la ciudad de Cartagena de Indias – Colombia
- Cultura Campesina Colombia ACPO (1 collar) – Colombia

== Honors ==
- 2000: Golden Plate Award of the American Academy of Achievement
- 2001: International Emmy Directorate Award
- 2004: Smithsonian Institution, Woodrow Wilson Center, Woodrow Wilson Award for Public Service
- 2005: MIPCOM, Personality of the Year
- Advertising Educational Foundation, Lifetime Achievement Award
- 2015: NATPE Brandon Tartikoff Legacy Award Recipient, with his daughter, Adriana Cisneros
- 2017: University of Miami, Doctor of humane letters

== Leadership ==
- Americas Society, Chairman's International Advisory Council
- Babson College, Board of Overseers
- Barrick Gold Corporation, Board of Directors; Member, International Advisory Board and Compensation Committee; Chair, Corporate Governance and Nominating Committee
- Cardinal Cisneros Foundation, Board of Trustees
- Council for the Atlantic Institute of Government, Member
- Global Information Infrastructure Commission (GIIC), Commissioner
- Haiti's Presidential Advisory Council on Economic Growth and Investment
- Harvard University, David Rockefeller Center for Latin American Studies, Advisory Committee
- Ibero-American Council for Productivity and Competitiveness, Member
- International Center for Economic Growth, Board of Overseers
- Rockefeller University, University Council, Member
- RRE Ventures LLC, Senior Advisor
- United Nations Information and Communication Technologies (ICT) Task Force, Charter Member

=== Past affiliations ===
- All-American Bottling Corporation, Chairman of the Board
- Chase Manhattan Bank, International Advisory Committee
- DirecTV, Executive Committee
- Georgetown University, Board of Trustees and the Latin American Board
- Hicks, Muse, Tate & Furst, Latin America Strategy Board of Directors
- Museum of Modern Art, Chairman's Council
- Panama Canal Authority, Board Member
- Panamerican Beverages, Inc., Board Member
- Power Corporation of Canada, Advisory Council
- Pueblo International, LLC, Board Member
- Queen Sofia Spanish Institute, Board of Directors
- The Nature Conservancy, Latin America Conservation Council
- United Nations Association of the United States, Member
- Univision Communications, Board Member
- World Economic Forum, Board of Governors for the Media, Communications and Entertainment Industries

== See also ==
- Colección Patricia Phelps de Cisneros
- List of Venezuelan Americans
