= Colección Patricia Phelps de Cisneros =

Latin American art organization

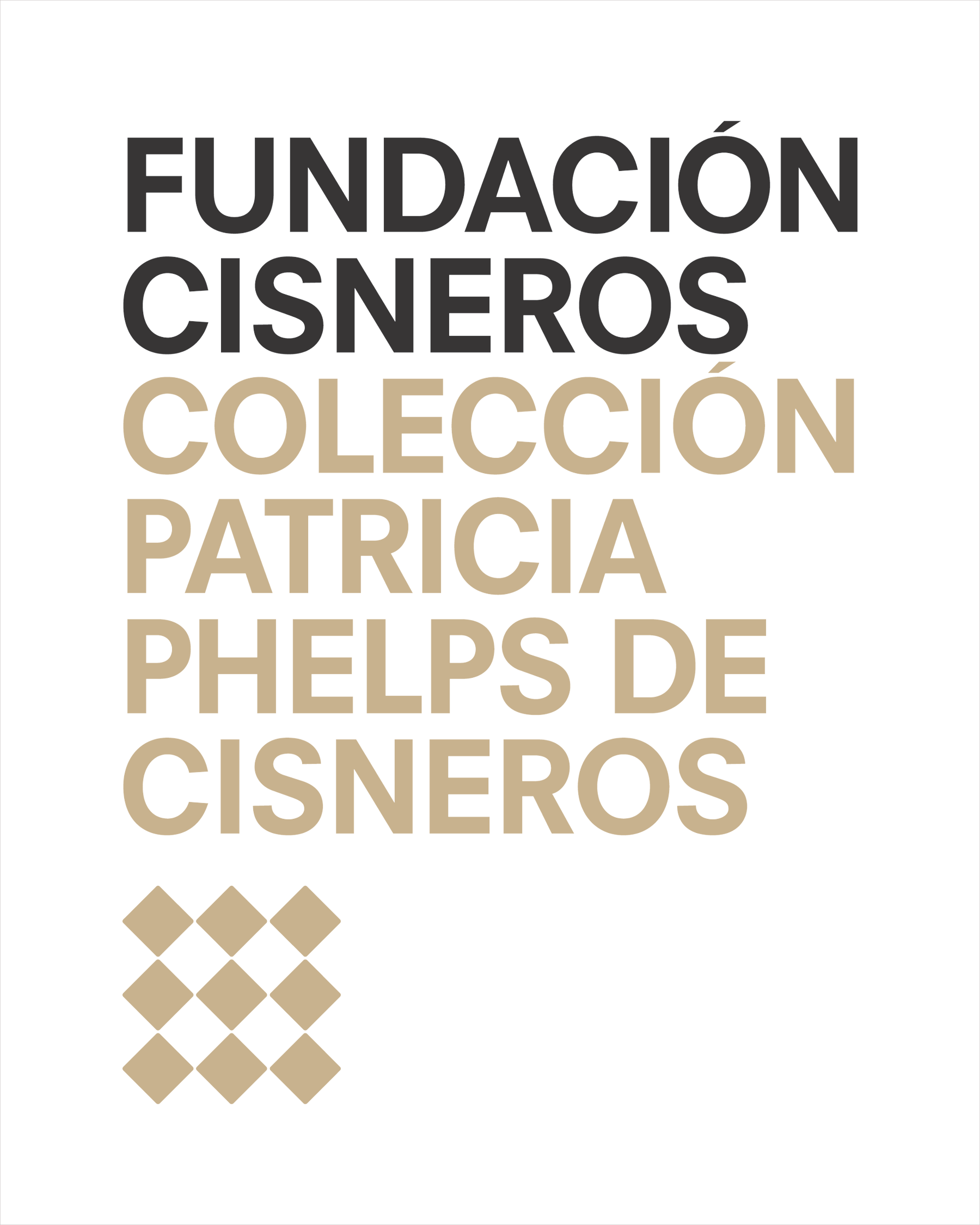
- Abbreviation: Colección Cisneros
- Named after: Patricia Phelps de Cisneros
- Formation: 1970s
- Founder: Patricia Phelps de Cisneros; Gustavo Cisneros
- Founded at: New York City; Caracas, Venezuela
- Type: Arts organization
- Legal status: Company
- Purpose: Cultural and educational initiative
- Headquarters: New York City; Caracas, Venezuela
- Region served: Latin America
- Official languages: English; Spanish; Portuguese
- Co-Founder: Patricia Phelps de Cisneros
- Co-Founder: Gustavo Cisneros
- Website: ColecciónCisneros.org

Colección Patricia Phelps de Cisneros (CPPC) is a privately held Latin American art organization based in Venezuela and New York City founded by Patricia Phelps de Cisneros and Gustavo Cisneros.

== History ==
In the 1970s, during Patricia Phelps de Cisneros' travels across Latin America with her husband, Gustavo Cisneros, she spent her time visiting artists in their studios and seeing art in local galleries and museums, and began actively purchasing and collecting artwork. Primarily collecting indigenous work during frequent expeditions through Venezuela, especially around the Orinoco in the Amazon River Basin.

As her collection grew, Cisneros saw that Latin American art was under-represented in the international art community, so the Colección Patricia Phelps de Cisneros (CPPC) was formed in the 1990s, with a goal of bringing visibility and impact to the way Latin American art history is viewed and appreciated. That effort has included a four-pronged approach: An ambitious approach to lending artworks around the world, working with scholars and academics to learn more about the artists and their works, the creation of a publications program to provide supporting information about the artists and their work, and building an online forum for the artwork.

== Collection ==
The CPPC is best known for its collection of Modernist geometric abstraction from Latin America and also comprises holdings of Latin American landscapes by traveler artists to Latin America in the 17th to 19th centuries; furniture and art from Latin America's colonial period; contemporary art from Latin America; and an important group of art and artifacts from indigenous peoples of Venezuela's Amazonas region, the Orinoco Collection. The mission of the Colección Patricia Phelps de Cisneros is to enhance appreciation of the diversity, sophistication, and range of art from Latin America.

Gradually, Cisneros began acquiring geometric abstract artwork that had been under-appreciated. It gradually grew into a significant holding of 20th century Latin American abstract art. She has appeared on top collector lists every year since 1998. Cisneros has been lending her collections to international exhibitions and institutions since 1999.

Cisneros credits her understanding of the importance of stewardship as a collector to her great-grandfather, William H Phelps, who meticulously cataloged his ornithological collection. She has said that her aesthetic developed as a result of having grown up in the modernist society of Caracas in the 1950s and 1960s.

The collection is organized in five categories that are areas of focus: Modern art, Contemporary art, Colonial art, the Orinoco collection, which is an ethnographic collection that traces the cultural production of 12 indigenous groups from the Orinoco River Basin, and the Traveler Artists to Latin America collection.

=== Modern art ===
The modern art collection is made up of works by Latin American artists who were active in the twentieth century. The focus is on artists who work in the geometric abstraction movements of modern art in Argentina, Brazil, Uruguay and Venezuela, with additional focus on artists working in both Europe and North America that have a connection to the history of Latin American art.

La Invención Concreta is a micro-site, publication, and series of exhibitions that reflect the growth of geometric abstraction movements in South America from 1930 to late 1970.

=== Contemporary art ===
This collection consists of contemporary artists from Latin America as well as other artists from other areas. In addition to the collection of work by contemporary artists, the collection provides support for artists residencies and grant funding. The collection is actively involved in education-based programming.

=== Colonial art ===
The Colonial art collection is focused on Colonial art and furnishings. This collection is made up of painting, furnishings and religious objects made in Venezuela from the Colonial Venezuela era that began in 1717 and continued throughout the Hispanic and Republican periods, leading up to the middle of the 19th century. It follows the independence of Venezuela and reflects the history of Venezuela's early development as a country.

=== Orinoco collection ===
The Orinoco collection is an ethnographic collection that traces the cultural production of materials by 12 indigenous groups from the Venezuelan Orinoco River Basin (also known as the Amazonas region) through the collection of ethnographic objects and documents from the following areas:

- Baniva
- Baré
- De'áruwa (Piaroa)
- E'ñepa (Panare)
- Híwi (Guahibo)
- Hoti
- Puinave
- Wakuénai (Curripaco)
- Warekena
- Tsase (Píapoco)
- Yanomami
- Ye'kuana

The collection began in the 1970s during vacations in the Orinoco region with Cisneros' family, when Cisneros realized the materials were quickly disappearing.

=== Traveler Artists to Latin America ===
The Traveler Artists to Latin America collection includes landscape art created by artists traveling to Latin America during the period that started in 1638 to the late 19th century. This collection reflects the development of Latin American landscape art, which started with Frans Post coming to Brazil from Amsterdam in 1637. The collection traces the trend of European and American artists coming to the region, an influx of visiting artists that led to the development of various national schools of paintings. The collection includes a Landscapes of the Americas collection, which is made up of drawings, paintings, photographs, prints, and watercolors from this time of active political change and reflects cultural exchange between Latin America and Spain and Portugal.

== Partnerships ==
Cisneros and the Colección Patricia Phelps de Cisneros have long-term relationships with various cultural institutions globally. Among these are Tate Modern, Museo Nacional Centro de Arte Reina Sofía, among many others.

In 2010, the Patricia Phelps de Cisneros Professorship in Latin American Art at Hunter College was established with a $1 million donation.

Cisneros has had a long-term relationship with the Museum of Modern Art in New York. The 2016 donation of 102 modern and contemporary Latin American artworks from the 1940s to 1990s to the Museum of Modern Art, which establishes the Patricia Phelps de Cisneros Research Institute for the Study of Art from Latin America at MoMA, join the previous donation by Colección Cisneros of over 40 other previously donated works. The gift is meant to be transformative and impactful on how Latin American art is valued and recognized globally. The gift includes works by Lygia Clark, Lygia Pape, Jesús Rafael Soto, Alejandro Otero, and Tomás Maldonado. Additional highlights are works by Willys de Castro, Hélio Oiticica, Juan Mele, Mira Schendel, and Gego.

The Patricia Phelps de Cisneros Research Institute for the Study of Art from Latin America is projected to open as a new wing at MoMA in 2019. In 2018, it was announced that Inés Katzenstein was appointed as the director of the newly formed Patricia Phelps de Cisneros Research Institute for the Study of Art from Latin America as well as the Curator of Latin American Art at the Museum of Modern Art.

In January 2018, it was announced that more than 200 artworks, many from contemporary artists, would be donated by the collection to six institutions: the Museum of Modern Art, who will receive 90 works; the Bronx Museum of the Arts; the Museo Nacional Centro de Arte Reina Sofía in Madrid, Spain; the Museo de Arte Moderno in Buenos Aires, Argentina; the Museo de Arte de Lima in Lima, Peru; and the Blanton Museum of Art at the University of Texas, Austin in Austin, Texas. The gifts include works by Amalia Pica (Argentina), Jac Leirner (Brazil), Luis Camnitzer (Uruguay), and Regina José Galindo (Guatemala).

As part of a discussion commemorating of the start of its fifth decade collecting art, in February 2018 Cisneros announced the upcoming donation of over 100 images from the traveler artists working in Latin America collection to Wikimedia Commons.

== Selected artists in the Colección ==
- Alejandro Otero
- Federico Herrero
- Fernanda Laguna
- Gego
- Hélio Oiticica
- Jac Leirner
- Jesús Rafael Soto
- Juan Melé
- Lygia Clark
- Lygia Pape
- Mira Schendel
- Tomás Maldonado
- Willys de Castro

== Selected exhibitions ==
Since 1999, CPPC has loaned and curated over 60 Latin American exhibitions globally.

- 2001: "Geometric Abstraction: Latin American Art from the Patricia Phelps de Cisneros Collection." Fogg Museum of Art, Harvard University (Cambridge, Massachusetts). March 3–November 4, 2001
- 2006: "The Rhythm of Color: Alejandro Otero and Willys de Castro – Two Modern Masters in the Colección Patricia Phelps de Cisneros." Aspen Institute (Aspen, Colorado). June 29–November 1, 2006
- 2007: "The Geometry of Hope: Latin American Art from the Patricia Phelps de Cisneros Collection." Blanton Museum of Art at the University of Texas at Austin. February 20–April 22, 2007; Grey Art Gallery at New York University. September 13–December 8, 2007
- 2010: "Desenhar no espaço (Fundação Iberê Camargo): Artistas abstratos do Brasil e da Venezuela na Coleção Patricia Phelps de Cisneros." Fundação Iberê Camargo (Porto Alegre, Brazil). July 29 – October 31, 2010
- 2010–2011: "Desenhar no espaço (Pinacoteca do Estado de São Paulo): Artistas abstratos do Brasil e da Venezuela na Coleção Patricia Phelps de Cisneros." Pinacoteca do Estado de São Paulo (São Paulo, Brazil). November 27, 2010 – February 6, 2011
- 2013: "La Invención Concreta: Colección Patricia Phelps de Cisneros." Museo Nacional Centro de Arte Reina Sofía (Madrid, Spain). January 23–September 16, 2013
- 2014: "Radical Geometry: Modern Art of South America from the Patricia Phelps de Cisneros Collection." Royal Academy of Arts (London, England). July 5–September 28, 2014
- 2015–2016: "Boundless Reality: Traveler Artists' Landscapes of Latin America from the Patricia Phelps de Cisneros Collection." Hunter College and the Americas Society (New York, New York). October 30, 2015 – January 23, 2016
- 2017: "Vistas del sur: Traveler Artists' Landscapes of Latin America from the Patricia Phelps de Cisneros Collection." New Britain Museum of American Art (New Britain, Connecticut). January 20–April 16, 2017
- 2017: "Overlook: Teresita Fernández Confronts Frederic Church at Olana." Olana State Historic Site (Columbia County, New York). May 14–November 5, 2017
- 2017–2018: "Making Art Concrete: Works from Argentina and Brazil in the Colección Patricia Phelps de Cisneros." Getty Center (Los Angeles, California). August 29, 2017 – February 11, 2018
- 2018: "Concrete Matters." Moderna Museet (Stockholm, Sweden). February 24–May 13, 2018

== Selected publications ==
- Jiménez, Ariel; Herkenhoff, Paulo (2010). Desenhar no Espaço: Artistas Abstratos do Brasil e da Venezuela na Coleção Patricia Phelps de Cisneros (PDF) (in Portuguese, English, and Spanish). Porto Alegre, Brazil: Fundação Iberê Camargo. ISBN 978-85-89680-16-5. OCLC 722764644. Archived from the original (Exhibition catalog) on 2016-04-02. Wikidata () – Catalog of an exhibition held at Fundação Iberê Camargo, Porto Alegre, Brazil, July 29-Oct. 31, 2010 and at Pinacoteca do Estado de São Paulo, São Paulo, Brazil, Nov. 27, 2010-Jan. 30, 2011
- Suárez, Osbel (exhibition concept and guest curator); García, María Amalia; Agnew, Michael (translations) (2011). Witschey, Erica; Fundación Juan March (eds.). Cold America: Geometric Abstraction in Latin América (1934–1973) (Exhibition catalog). Madrid: Fundación Juan March. ISBN 978-84-7075-588-0. OCLC 707460289. Wikidata () – Exhibition catalog of Cold America, Geometric Abstraction in Latin America (1934–1973), Fundación Juan March, Madrid, February 11-May 15, 2011
  - Torres-García, Joaquín (2011). "Vouloir construire / The Will to Construct" (Exhibition catalog). Cold America: Geometric Abstraction in Latin América (1934–1973): This catalogue and its Spanish edition are published on the occasion of the exhibition. Madrid: Fundación Juan March. pp. 406–407. ISBN 978-84-7075-588-0. OCLC 707460289. Wikidata ()
- Pérez-Barreiro, Gabriel; Borja-Villel, Manuel (2013). Concrete Invention: Colección Patricia Phelps De Cisneros : Reflections on Geometric Abstraction from Latin America and Its Legacy. Madrid: Museo Nacional Centro de Arte Reina Sofía/Turner. ISBN 978-8-415-42797-1. OCLC 828897697. Wikidata () – Published on the occasion of an exhibition of the same name held at Museo Nacional Centro de Arte Reina Sofía, Madrid, Spain, January 22-September 16, 2013
- Pérez-Barreiro, Gabriel; Borja-Villel, Manuel J. (2013). La invención concreta: Colección Patricia Phelps de Cisneros: Reflexiones en torno a la abstracción géometrica latinoamercana y sus legados (in Spanish). Madrid: Turner. ISBN 978-8-415-42796-4. OCLC 984797807. Wikidata () – Obra publicada con motivo de la exposición homónima celebrada en el Museo Reina Sofía del 22 de enero al 16 de septiembre de 2013
- Delgado, Lelia; Ortega Mendoza, Andrés; Brewer-Carías, Charles; Cobo Gradín, Fernando; de Arce Andratschke, Alejandro (2013). Orinoco. Viaxe a un mundo perdido. Unha Colección da Fundación Cisneros (in Spanish, English, and Galician). Santiago de Compostela: Fundación Cidade da Cultura de Galicia. ISBN 978-8-445-35083-6. OCLC 878067166. Wikidata () – Catalogue qui accompagne une exposition de la "Fundación Cisneros Orinoco Collection", tenu au "Museo Centro Gaiás" dans la "Cidade da Cultura de Galicia."
- Aste, Richard; Rivas Pérez, Jorge F.; Stratton-Pruitt, Suzanne L.; Brown, Michael A.; Bagneris, Mia L. (2013). Aste, Richard (ed.). Behind Closed Doors: Art in the Spanish American Home, 1492-1898. Brooklyn, NY: Brooklyn Museum. ISBN 978-0-872-73172-1. OCLC 825046947. Wikidata () – Published in conjunction with an exhibition organized by and held at the Brooklyn Museum, Sept. 20, 2013-Jan. 12, 2014. Also held at the Albuquerque Museum of Art and History, Feb. 16-May 18, 2014, New Orleans Museum of Art, Jun. 20-Sept. 21, 2014, and the John and Mable Ringling Museum of Art, Oct. 17, 2014-Jan. 11, 2015
- Gullar, Ferreira; Guyer, Leland (translations by); Itamar Harrison, Marguerite (2013). An Ordinary Man (ebook) (in Portuguese and English). Caracas/New York: Colección Patricia Phelps de Cisneros. ISBN 978-0-988-20559-8. Wikidata ()
- Pérez-Barreiro, Gabriel (exhibition curator); Locke, Adrian (exhibition curator); Lea, Sarah (exhibition curator); García, María Amalia; Whitelegg, Isobel (2014). Radical Geometry: Modern Art of South America from the Patricia Phelps de Cisneros Collection. London: Royal Academy of Arts. ISBN 978-1-907-53369-3. OCLC 889949567. Wikidata ()
- Diener, Pablo (text by); Pérez-Oramas, Luis (text by); Romero, Rafael (text by) (2015). Manthorne, Katherine (ed.). Traveler Artists: Landscapes of Latin America from the Patricia Phelps De Cisneros Collection (in English and Spanish). New York: Colección Patricia Phelps de Cisneros. ISBN 978-0-982-35441-4. OCLC 907811565. Wikidata ()
- Gottschaller, Pia; Le Blanc, Aleca (2017). Gottschaller, Pia; Le Blanc, Aleca; Gilbert, Zanna; Learner, Tom; Perchuk, Andrew (eds.). Making Art Concrete: Works from Argentina and Brazil in the Colección Patricia Phelps de Cisneros (Exhibition catalog). Los Angeles: Getty Conservation Institute and Getty Research Institute / Getty Publications. ISBN 978-1-606-06529-7. OCLC 982373712. Wikidata ()
