= Venevisión Plus =

- Type: Cable Television Network
- Country: Venezuela
- Broadcast area: United States; Latin America; Venezuela; Spain

Programming
- Picture format: 1080i HDTV (downscaled to 480i/576i for the SD feed)

Ownership
- Owner: Grupo Cisneros
- Parent: Cisneros Media
- Sister channels: Venevisión; Novelisima

History
- Launched: December 1, 2007; 18 years ago
- Founder: Gustavo Cisneros
- Closed: February 11, 2019; 7 years ago
- Replaced by: Ve Plus TV
- Former names: Venevisión Continental

Venevisión Plus was a cable television channel within the Grupo Cisneros, controlled by tycoon Gustavo Cisneros, which holds 100% stake in the channel. Venevisión Plus is based in Miami and from December 1, 2007, its signal is transmitted in Venezuela, while in 2008 it came to Chile, Mexico and Argentina. In August 2010 it launched Venevision Plus Dominicana, designed for the Dominican Republic audience.

== Programs ==
- Close up
- Más allá de la Belleza
- A tu salud light
- Más+Plus
- 35 milímetros
- Boom
- Shirley
- Actualidad en Positivo
- Acá en Venezuela
- Te tocó a ti
- Palabra Final
- Todo un chef
- Piel a piel
- El Chateo

== Novelas ==
- Los Secretos de Lucía
- Guerra de mujeres
- Travesuras del corazón
- Pobre millonaria
- Torrente
- ¿Vieja yo?
- Entire life
- The mysteries of love
- Cosita rica
- The Gonzalez
- Ángel rebelde
- Women's War
- Valeria

== Humorous ==
- Lente Loco
- Mad and loose
- Qué Locura
- Marry and You'll See

== Competitions and varieties ==
- Tu Desayuno Alegre
- Architect of Dreams
- Sábado Gigante
- ¡ Live the dream !
- Don Francisco Presenta
- The Great Navigator
- The battle of the sexes
- Super Sábado Sensacional
- A tu Salud Light

== Talkshows ==
- Who is right?
- Cases of Family
- Women's history and men too
- Marta Susana
- Another question
- First Impact
- Wake up America

== Slogans ==
- 2007: More Entertainment, More Excitement
- 2008: Para ti
- 2009: Every day a new emotion

== See also ==
- Ve Plus TV
- Venevisión
