= Jac Leirner =

Brazilian artist

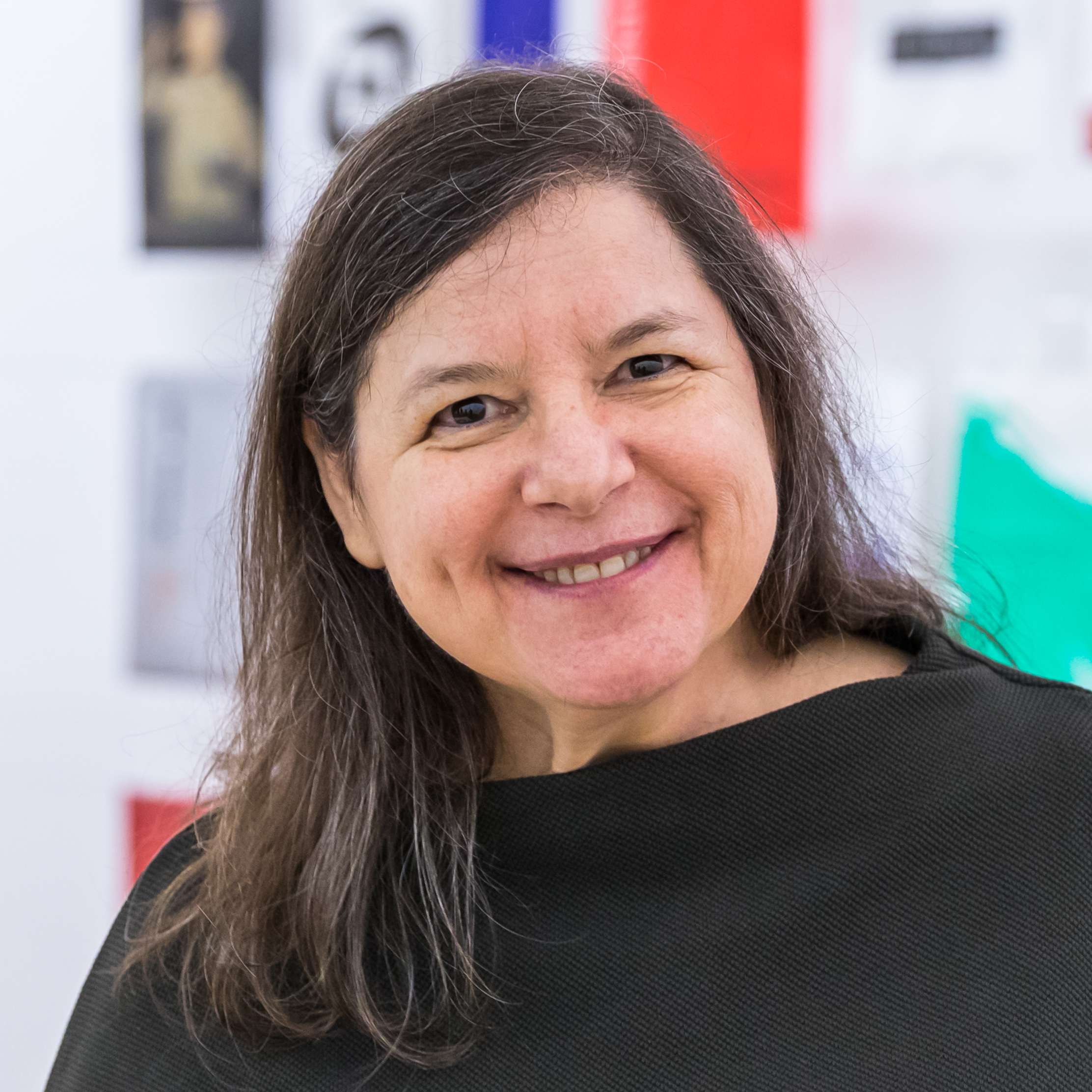
- Jac Leirner, 2019
- Born: Jacqueline Leirner; 1961 (age 64–65); São Paulo, Brazil
- Parent(s): Adolfo Leirner; Fulvia Leirner

Jacqueline "Jac" Leirner (born 1961) is a Brazilian artist. Leirner is best known for the sculptures and installations she creates from mundane objects and ephemera, including devalued bank notes, used envelopes, promotional tickets, empty packs of cigarettes and plastic shopping bags.

== Early life and education ==
Leirner was born in São Paulo, Brazil to Fulvia (née Bornstein) Leirner and Adolpho Leirner, modern and contemporary art collectors.

Leirner studied visual arts at Fundação Armando Alvares Penteado, São Paulo, Brazil, where she graduated in 1984 and taught between 1987 and 1989.

== Career ==
Leirner's work references the history of Brazilian Constructivism and the legacy of Arte Povera and Minimalism. Place and duration related to personal experience are important to her practice. She is often compared to Cildo Meireles, Tunga, and Marcel Duchamp.

Leirner organizes and presents her material in unusually complex ways, highlighting the banality of each object, enabling a refocus of its form, colour and beauty. Her work evolved from drawing and painting around 1981, as a reaction to tonal values of objects in space and the narrative that creates.

=== Works ===
Leirner created a work titled To and From (Walker) with the participation of the staff at the Walker Art Center. It is a collection of various sized envelopes connected by polyurethane cord and plexiglass. It was shown at the center from November 3, 1991 - January 26, 1992. In her show Junkie at White Cube, she showed prints of sculptures she made by carving cocaine crystals juxtaposed with household items. She said that the sculptures were made during four drug binges with three to five grams of cocaine.

She created Untitled (Corpus Delicti) in 1993 with a combination of air-sickness bags, cardboard, and polyurethane cord. The bags come from airlines of different nations. One of her well known areas of work is her sculptures with cruzeiros, the devalued Brazilian currency. She created a collage of 100 and 100,000 bills painted over and put together into a square titled All the One-Hundreds.

Her cigarette pack series Lung was described by Guy Brett as "a startling metaphor" where "the units of mass production" become "the cells of the bodily organ". The packs are deconstructed and compressed into stacks.

== Other work ==
She was a bassist in the punk band UKCT which sparked her to notice the repeating symbols of culture.

== Personal life ==
Leirner currently lives and works in São Paulo, Brazil.

== Selected exhibitions ==
=== Solo exhibitions ===
- 1993: Centre d’Art Contemporain Geneva
- 1999: Museu de Arte Moderna de São Paulo
- 2004: Miami Art Museum
- 2011: Centre d’Art de Saint Nazaire, France and the Estação Pinacoteca do Estado de São Paulo
- 2012: Yale School of Art (2012)
- 2014: Centro Atlántico de Arte Moderna, Las Palmas de Gran Canaria
- 2015: Bem Pensado, Galerie Fortes Vilaca
- 2017: The Fruitmarket Gallery, Edinburgh

=== Group exhibitions ===
- 1983: Bienal de São Paulo
- 1989: Bienal de São Paulo
- 1990: 44th Venice Biennale
- 1991: Walker Art Center, Minneapolis and Museum of Modern Art, Oxford
- 1992: dOCUMENTA (IX), Kassel
- 1993: Latin American Artists of the Twentieth Century
- 1997: 47th Venice Biennale

== Residencies ==
- University of Oxford, Visiting Fellow
- Museum of Modern Art, Oxford, Artist-in-Residence
- 1991: Walker Art Center, Artist-in-Residence
