= National Association of Television Program Executives =

NATPE
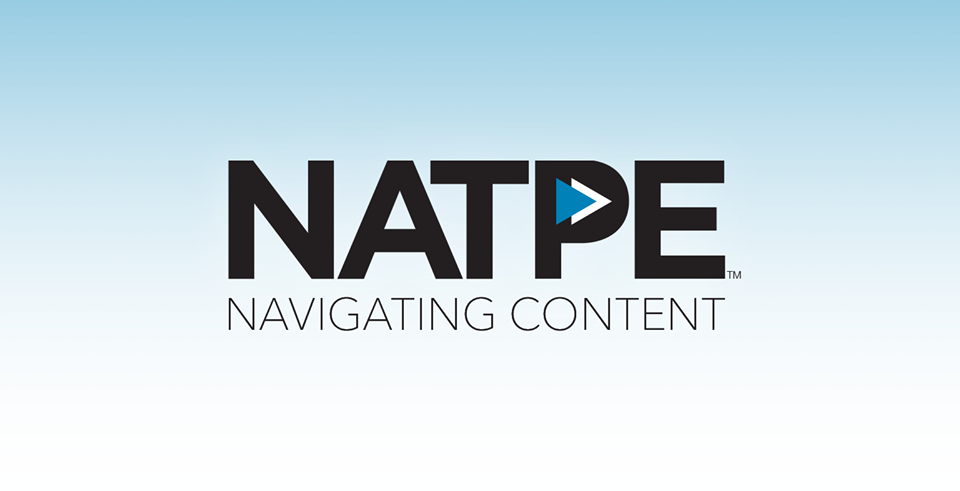
- Founded: 1963
- Website: https://global.natpe.com/

The National Association of Television Program Executives (NATPE) is a professional association of television and media executives established in 1963. It operates as a non-profit organization.

NATPE hosts conferences and industry events and provides member programming related to television and media.

== History ==
Program directors at U.S. television stations sought a forum to discuss and address challenges created by the Prime Time Access Rule (PTAR). Encouraged by developments in syndicated programming, sales representatives and 64 program directors appointed Stan Cohen of WDSU New Orleans as temporary president.

The first formal meeting of the National Association of Television Program Executives took place in May 1964 at the New York Hilton Hotel. During the first two-day meeting, topics included the network relationship to local programming, talent sourcing, government influence on programming, and formats for handling political issues.

NATPE's membership and conference attendance grew over subsequent decades and declined following the dot-com bust in 2001.

NATPE rebranded as NATPE Content First in 2010, with the stated goal of attracting new media professionals alongside its core television membership.

The NATPE Educational Foundation was established in 1978 to build connections among the television industry, academia, and students. It provides fellowships, grants, and prizes to the academic community, supported by membership fees, sponsors, and endowments. Lew Klein, one of the founders of NATPE and an early president of the organization, served as president of the Educational Foundation until his death in 2019.

In 2019, NATPE signed a partnership agreement with China International Television Corporation (CITVC), a wholly owned subsidiary of Chinese state broadcaster China Central Television (CCTV).

In October 2022, NATPE announced it would file for bankruptcy, citing the effects of the COVID-19 pandemic and declining reserves. NATPE said it still intended to hold its annual conference in January 2023, though the event was later cancelled.

In the resulting court-ordered bankruptcy auction, NATPE assets were acquired by Canadian company Brunico Communications.

In September 2025, Amazon MGM Studios executive Brad Beale, Lionsgate executive Kevin Beggs, and NBCUniversal executive Michael Bonner joined NATPE's executive board.

NATPE Global was held in Miami, Florida, from February 4 to 6, 2026, at the InterContinental Miami.

== NATPE Budapest ==
In 2011, NATPE acquired DISCOP EAST, an event focused on the Central and Eastern European media industry. The event was renamed NATPE Budapest.
