= Norge (appliance manufacturer) =

Brand of appliances

- Type: Subsidiary
- Industry: Appliances
- Founded: 1930s
- Defunct: 2006; 20 years ago
- Fate: Acquired by Maytag in 1986, later acquired by Whirlpool in 2006. Closed
- Owner: Magic Chef
- Parent: Maytag Corporation

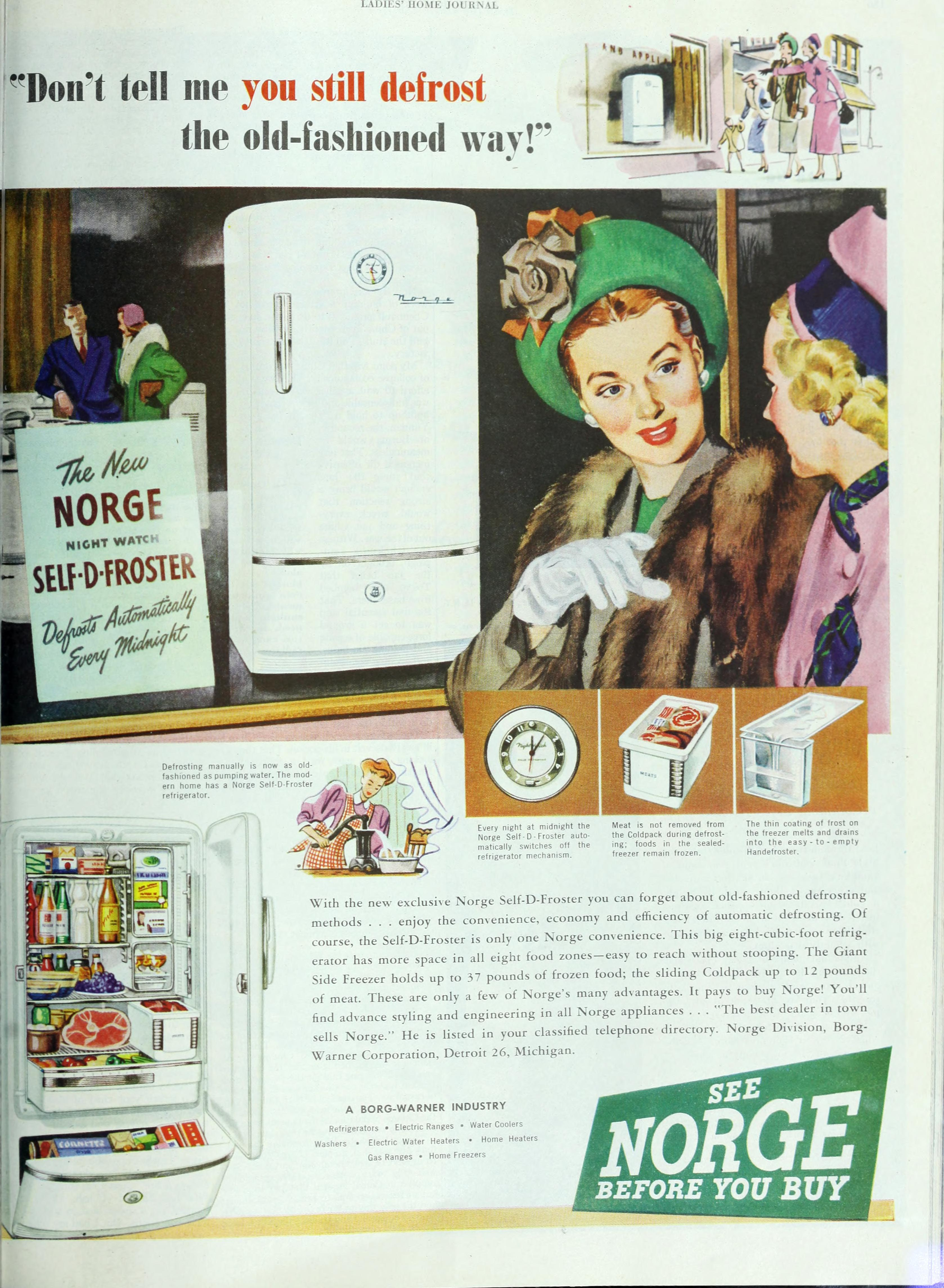
1948 ad for Norge refrigerators.

Norge was a brand of appliances originally manufactured by the Norge Appliance Company. It was once a division of BorgWarner and later a division of Fedders. The Norge name was acquired in 1979 by Magic Chef, which in turn was absorbed by Maytag in 1986. Since 2006, Maytag is a part of Whirlpool Corporation.

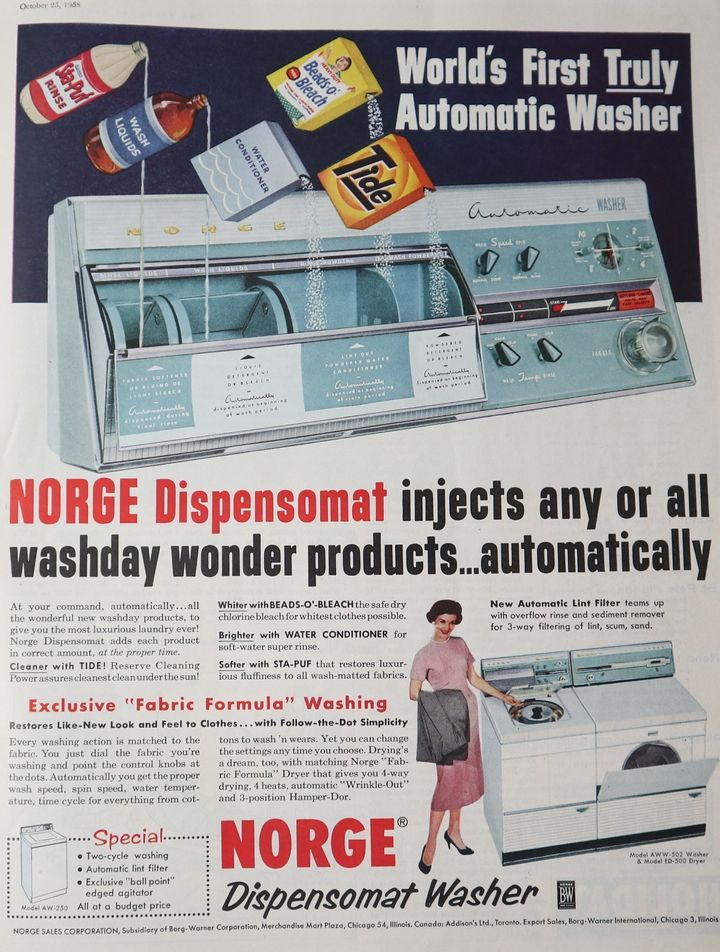
Norge Sales Corporation; Model AWW 562 Washer & Model LD-300 Dryer

== Popular culture ==
- Dan Aykroyd portrayed a Norge repairman on Saturday Night Live.
