= Venevisión =

Venezuelan television network founded in 1961

- Logo used since 2006 (Note: The logo's style has been in use since 1970.)
- Type: Free-to-air television network
- Country: Venezuela
- Headquarters: Caracas, Venezuela

Programming
- Language: Spanish
- Picture format: HDTV 1080i (downscaled to 480i for the SD feed)

Ownership
- Owner: Cisneros Media (Grupo Cisneros)
- Key people: Jonathan Blum (president of Cisneros Media); Andrés Badra (vice president and general manager of Venevisión Media)
- Sister channels: Venevisión Internacional; Ve Plus; Novelísima

History
- Founded: March 1, 1961; 65 years ago
- Founder: Diego Cisneros
- Replaced: TeleVisa (1953-1960)
- Former names: Corporación Venezolana de Televisión (1961-1966)

Links
- Webcast: https://venevisionplay.com; (available only in Venezuela)
- Website: www.venevision.com

Availability

Terrestrial
- Analog VHF: Channel 4 (Caracas and other states, listings may vary)

Venevisión (Spanish pronunciation: [beneβiˈsjon]) is a Venezuelan free-to-air television channel and one of Venezuela's largest television networks, owned by the Cisneros Media division of Grupo Cisneros. It was founded in 1961 by Diego Cisneros. It is one of the major telenovela producers in the world, along with TelevisaUnivision, TV Azteca, Telemundo, TV Globo, Caracol Televisión, RCN Televisión, ABS-CBN, GMA Network and Channel 3.

== History ==
The company's roots date back to June 1, 1953, with the establishment of Televisora Independiente S.A, (TeleVisa), which operated channel 4 in Caracas and channel 5 in Maracaibo. When TeleVisa went bankrupt in 1959 and 1960, Diego Cisneros purchased the remaining assets of the company. On February 27, 1961, Venevisión (a portmanteau based on the words Venezuela and Televisión, with Venezolana de Televisión as its legal name) was officially inaugurated with a special inaugural ceremony on March 1, 1961, a show in which thousands of people attended and took place in the station's parking lot. Venevisión began with a capital of 5,500,000 bolívares and 150 employees, including artists, administrators, and technical personnel. Venevisión's original administrators were Diego Cisneros (president), Alfredo Torres (transmission manager), Héctor Beltrán (production manager), and Orlando Cuevas (general manager).

Initially, Venevisión broadcast live because they hadn't yet installed the videotape system. Except for the news, the elaboration of their programs utilized the technical formats used in movies at that time. In a short period of time, Venevisión greatly expanded nationally and was seen in most of Venezuela on many VHF and UHF channels.

In March 1961, the newly created Venevisión and the American television network, ABC, signed two agreements: one for technical support and the other for the rights to broadcast each other's programs, joining the ABC-led Worldvision network. Because of these agreements, Venevisión later began using the videotape system. In their first year of existence, Venevisión made approximately 800,000 bolívares a month in advertisements. By 1971, it began to bring its then black-and-white programs to viewers internationally via videotape, with the drama program Esmeralda as the first to do so. In the next year, the network officially took over the broadcasts of the Miss Venezuela beauty pageant, and it has been its home ever since.

In the 1970s, Venevisión changed its legal name from Venezolana de Televisión (VENTEL) to Corporación Venezolana de Televisión (CVT). Channel 8, initially known as CVTV, took over the Venezolana de Televisión name, though abbreviating it as VTV, when it was nationalized in 1974.

In 1976, Venevisión moved their transmitters, which were located on the top of a building in La Colina, a neighborhood in Caracas where Venevisión's studios can be found, to Los Mecedores, near Venezolana de Televisión's studios and CANTV's installations. In Los Mecedores, a tower with an altitude of 100 meters was placed, and a powerful new antenna was installed. With this new antenna, Venevisión's signal was able to reach Petare, Caricuao, and Guarenas with better quality. In the 1970s, like other television stations in Venezuela, Venevisión began experimenting with color broadcasts. In 1978, the Ministry of Transport and Communications fined Venevisión 4,000 bolívares on two occasions in one week for violating the regulations for color broadcasting. It was only the next year when color broadcasts commenced, with full color transmissions commencing on June 1, 1980.

The first program by Venevision shown in color was the eighth edition of the OTI Festival, which was held in Caracas and broadcast live to all Latin America, Spain, and Portugal on December 8, 1979. Since 1981, it held the rights to the Miss Venezuela pageant, when Cisneros became its organizer.

In 1982, Venevisión began preliminary work in the city of El Tigre, Anzoátegui, to install equipment that would expand and improve their coverage in that region.

On November 1, 1986, Venevisión was the first television station in Venezuela to have their very own satellite dish.

On May 27, 1987, President Jaime Lusinchi gave a 20-year broadcasting license to the network.

On February 4, 1992, Carlos Andrés Pérez addressed the nation from Venevisión's studios during a coup attempt against his government.

Beginning on March 22, 1992, the channel began broadcasting for 24 hours on Fridays, Saturdays, and Sundays. From April 1994, it started broadcasting for 24 hours seven days a week, which continues to this day.

In 1995, Venevisión was the second television network in South America (Brazil's Rede Bandeirantes was the first in 1994 and third overall in Latin America after Mexico's Canal de las Estrellas network in 1993) to include news and movies with closed caption and the movies in Second audio program sound.

Venevisión held the broadcasting rights to Venezuelan baseball games during the 2004–2005 and the 2005–2006 baseball seasons.

Since Venevisión was inaugurated in 1961, their mascot has been a tiger; the channel is nicknamed El Canal del Tigrito due to this. The mascot returned for the Christmas spots in 2021 and 2022.

In 2007, it started simulcasting Copa America and Miss Venezuela 2007 in high-definition format.

Since September 2014, Venevisión has become the oldest television network in Venezuela and surpassed the record of its former rival Radio Caracas Televisión before its forced closure in May 2007, 53 years and 6 months after it was launched.

Its sixtieth anniversary was marked by the return of an old slogan (La verdad se ve en pantalla; "the truth is seen on screen") but had an underwhelming offer, such as reruns of old telenovelas, including low-impact productions, lack of new programs to increase fidelity among new viewers and the problems caused by competition from streaming services. In November 2021, it announced that it would not cancel Super Sábado Sensacional in 2022.

In May 2025, it was announced that Venevisión would return to fiction production with a reboot of the teen musical series Somos Tú y Yo.

On January 30, 2026, Venevisión's signal was suspended from the digital terrestrial platform and from FTA Venezuela, a free-to-air satellite television platform. The former is managed by CANTV and the latter by Conatel, both of which are state organs, and the suspension led to a large number of viewers losing access to the channel. Cable companies where Venevisión's signal was fed from FTA Venezuela were also affected.

== March ==
Venevisión uses a march composed by Aníbal de Abreu in 1964 as its corporate theme. It is often broadcast when the network delivers high-impact breaking news information and has also been adopted by social media netizens for the same reason.

== International broadcasts ==
Many of Venevisión's programs can be seen in other countries on Ve Plus TV, Venevisión Plus and ViendoMovies, a cable channel completely owned by Venevisión. Other channels, such as Univision in the United States and Televisa in Mexico, broadcast some of Venevisión's shows.

== Political position ==
On April 11, 2002, the network along with most of the other private networks in Venezuela, simultaneously showed Chávez's address to the nation in split screen with the shooting of people in a demonstration prior to the 2002 Venezuelan coup d'état attempt. The next day, Isaías Rodríguez announced in a news conference that Chávez had not resigned and that there had been a coup.

After the Presidential election in 2006, Venevision softened its opposition to Chávez. For the presidential election, Venevision devoted 84% of its coverage to Chavez's positions and 16% to the opposition. Critics saw the change, which created rifts in the Venezuelan elite, as a way of maintaining its broadcasting licence by avoiding a confrontation with Chávez. The criticism of Venevisión by the opposition increased during the refusal to renew the broadcasting license of RCTV by the Chávez government in 2007. Critics said Venevisión would benefit from the closure of RCTV, which was Venevisión's main rival. Cisneros, however, said he expected only around a 5% increase in advertising revenue after accounting for inflation.

== Programming ==
Venevisión's programming include telenovelas, series, news, current affairs, documentaries, talk shows, variety shows, reality shows, sports and special events. It also includes acquired programming from Televisa, Univision, Caracol Televisión and TV Globo. All of its programs are also available for streaming on Venevisión Play.

== Venevisión Play ==
Venevisión Play
- Website type: OTT video on demand streaming platform
- Available in: Spanish
- Headquarters: Caracas, Venezuela
- Area served: Worldwide
- Owner: Venevisión
- Parent: Cisneros Media (Grupo Cisneros)
- Website: venevisionplay.com
- Registration: Free
- Launched: August 25, 2023; 3 years ago
- Current status: Active

Venevisión Play is a Venezuelan video on-demand over-the-top streaming service owned by Venevisión that was launched on August 25, 2023. The service mainly distributes telenovelas produced by Venevisión and other programs, including news, television series, documentaries, sports programming, talk shows, reality shows, Miss Venezuela, and other special events.
