= 2012 in art =

The year 2012 in art involved various significant events.

== Events ==
- January – Isabella Stewart Gardner Museum extension in Boston, Massachusetts, designed by Renzo Piano Building Workshop, is opened
- February – Extension to Städel art gallery in Frankfurt, Germany, designed by schneider+schumacher, scheduled for opening
- March – The Palm Springs Art Museum opens a satellite museum in Palm Desert
- March – The Jerwood Gallery in Hastings opens
- March – A large trove of art is discovered in Munich, part of which was looted by the Nazis. German authorities only acknowledge the discovery after press reports in November 2013
- March 29 – Refurbished and renamed Museum of Contemporary Art Australia, Sydney, with new Mordant Wing designed by Sam Marshall, opened
- May 1 – One of four versions of The Scream by Edvard Munch sells at Sotheby's in New York City for $119.9 million including the buyer's commission, the most ever paid for a work of art at auction
- May 10 – God Speed by Edmund Leighton is sold to a private collector through Sotheby's in London
- May 11 – ArcelorMittal Orbit sculpture and observation tower (114.5 m (376 ft) tall) in Olympic Park, London, designed by Anish Kapoor with Cecil Balmond and Ushida Findlay Architects, unveiled
- May 29 – Tate Britain announces that it has received a donation of nine works of art dating from the 1960s–90s from the private collection of Mercedes and Ian Stoutzker
- July 17 - Odalisque in Red Pants by Henri Matisse which was stolen off the wall at the Contemporary Art Museum of Caracas in the capital city of Venezuela and replaced with a forgery inside of its former frame is recovered in an FBI sting operation in Miami, Florida.
- July 18 – Tate Modern, London, opens The Tanks performance art/installation space, refurbished by Herzog & de Meuron
- July 27
  - 08:12 – Martin Creed's Work No 1197: All the bells in a country rung as quickly and as loudly as possible for three minutes is performed across the United Kingdom to mark the opening of the 2012 Summer Olympics
  - 21:00 – Performance of Isles of Wonder, the 2012 Summer Olympics opening ceremony in London directed by Danny Boyle, begins
- August 12 – Damien Hirst's representation of the British Union Flag forms the arena centrepiece for the 2012 Summer Olympics closing ceremony in London. Es Devlin is designer for the ceremony and the creative director and choreographer is Kim Gavin
- September - The Museo Alameda in San Antonio, Texas, U.S.A. closes
- September 21 – Islamic art gallery at the Musée du Louvre in Paris, designed by Mario Bellini and Rudy Ricciotti, opens
- September 23 – Renovation and new wing for Stedelijk Museum Amsterdam, designed by Benthem Crouwel Architekten, opened to public
- September 27 – The "Isleworth Mona Lisa" is unveiled to the public for the first time in 40 years
- October 1 (National Day of the People's Republic of China) – China Art Museum and the Power Station of Art open in the former China pavilion at Expo 2010 in Shanghai to house exhibitions of contemporary Chinese art
- October 29 – Hurricane Sandy hits New York City and causes extreme damage to buildings, basements, art galleries and artist studios.
- November – The auction house Sotheby's removes Cady Noland's piece Cowboys Milking (1990) from their contemporary sale after the artist "disavows" the work. Both Noland and the auction house are then sued by the piece's owner, gallerist Marc Jancou for twenty six million dollars (with twenty million being sought from Noland and six from Sotheby's) but a judge dismisses Jancou's lawsuit
- December 11 – Le Louvre-Lens, a branch museum of the Musée du Louvre, designed by SANAA, opens in the French city of Lens, Pas-de-Calais, a former centre of coal mining

== Exhibitions ==
- To January 9 – "de Kooning: A Retrospective" at the Museum of Modern Art, New York
- To February 5 – "Leonardo da Vinci, Painter at the Court of Milan" at the National Gallery, London
- To February 12 – "Johann Zoffany RA: Society Observed" at the Yale Center for British Art, New Haven, Connecticut (then at the Royal Academy, London from March 10 to June 10)
- January 21 until April 9 – "David Hockney: A Bigger Picture" at the Royal Academy, London
- January 27 until May 13 - No Lone Zone (works by Teresa Margolles, Cinthia Marcelle, David Zink Yi, and Tercerunquinto) at the Tate Modern in London, UK.
- February 1 until May 6 – "Van Gogh Up Close" at the Philadelphia Museum of Art
- February 9 until May 27 – "Lucian Freud Portraits" at the National Portrait Gallery, London
- February 11 until April 1 "Three From Cuba: The Art of Vicente, Miguel and Sandro - The Fantastic to the Sublime" (Vicente Hernandez, Sandro de la Rosa, Miguel Florido) at the Appleton Museum of Art in Ocala, Florida.
- February 15 until May 27 - "Van Dyck in Sicily" at the Dulwich Picture Gallery in Dulwich, South London, England.
- February 15 until July 15 – "Picasso & Modern British Art" at Tate Britain, London (then at Scottish National Gallery of Modern Art, Edinburgh from August 4 until November 4)
- February 18 until October 28 - Manet in Black at the Boston Museum of Fine Arts in Boston, Massachusetts.
- March 13 until July 1 – "Degas et le Nu" at the Musée d'Orsay, Paris
- March 14 until June 5 – "Turner Inspired in the Light of Claude" at the National Gallery, London
- From March 15 – "Rodin to Now: Modern Sculpture" at the Palm Springs Art Museum, Palm Desert
- April 4 until July 20 - "The Ideal City: The Renaissance Utopia at Urbino between Piero della Francesca and Raphael” at the Galleria Nazionale delle Marche in Urbino, Italy
- April 4 until September 9 – "Damien Hirst" at Tate Modern, London
- From April 7 until July 29 - "Fracture: Daido Moriyama" at the Los Angeles County Museum of Art, curated by Edward Robinson.
- From May 25 until September 2 - "Maxfield Parrish: The Retrospective at The National Museum of American Illustration in Newport, Rhode Island.
- From June 9 until September 2 – Picturing the South, photographs by Martin Parr, Kael Alford, and Shane Lavalette
- From June 28 until October 14 – "Edvard Munch: The Modern Eye" at Tate Modern, London
- From August 18 – "India: Art Now" at the Arken Museum of Modern Art, Copenhagen
- From September 9 – "Arte Povera: The Great Awakening" at the Kunstmuseum Basel
- From September 12 – "Pre-Raphaelites: Victorian Avant-Garde" at Tate Britain, London
- From September 15 until December 9 – "Bronze" at the Royal Academy, London
- From September 16 – "Ken Price Sculpture: A Retrospective" at the Los Angeles County Museum of Art
- From September 18 – "Regarding Warhol: Sixty Artists, Fifty Years" at the Metropolitan Museum of Art, New York
- From September 20 until November 18 – "Discovering Columbus" by Tatzu Nishi at Columbus Circle in New York City, New York
- From September 28 – "Paul Gauguin: The Prints" at the Kunsthaus Zürich
- From October 5 – "Picasso Black and White" at the Solomon R. Guggenheim Museum, New York
- From October 7 until January 13, 2013- "Franz Kline: Coal abd Dteel" (curated by Robert Mattison) at the Allentown Art Museum in Allentown, Pennsylvania
- From October 10 – "Richard Hamilton: The Late Works" at the National Gallery, London
- From October 13 – "Seduced by Art: Photography Past and Present" at the National Gallery, London
- From November 15 – "George Bellows" at the Metropolitan Museum of Art, New York
- From November 18 – "Tokyo 1955–1970: A New Avant-Garde" at the Museum of Modern Art New York City, New York
- From December 4 – "Matisse: In Search of True Painting" at the Metropolitan Museum of Art, New York

== Works ==
- El Anatsui – "Broken Bridge ll" (pressed tin and broken mirrors) along the High Line on the western wall between west 21st street and west 22nd street in Manhattan, New York City.
- David Kimball Anderson - "Hydrogen snd Nitrogen" (sculpture)
- Julius von Bismarck and Julian Charrière - "Some Pigeons are more Equal than Others" executed at the Venice Biennale of Architecture and then in Copenhagen
- Jean-François Boclé - The Tears of Bananaman (completed -mixed media 300 kg of banana with incisions made by the artist, and wooden base)
- Monica Bonvicini – Run (installation in Olympic Park, London)
- David Breuer-Weil – Alien (sculpture)
- Berlinde De Bruyckere - "We are All Flesh" (sculpture)
- Carlos Cruz-Diez – "Double Induction in a Chromatic Frequency" mosaic tiled walkways at Marlins Park in Miami, Florida
- Anya Gallaccio – The Light Pours Out of Me (installation)
- Annie Han and Daniel Mihalyo – Inversion: Plus Minus (sculpture, Portland, Oregon)
- Ralph Heimans – Portrait of Queen Elizabeth II
- Damien Hirst – Verity (20.25 m (66 ft) bronze statue of a pregnant woman holding a sword aloft, erected at Ilfracombe, England, October 17)
- Celia Paul – Painter and Model (self-portrait)
- John Howard Sanden – Laura Welch Bush
- Jud Turner – Great Blue Heron (sculpture, Eugene, Oregon)
- Danh Vo - I M U U R 2'x
- Henry Weber - Statue of Tony DeMarco in the North End neighborhood of Boston, Massachusetts

== Awards ==
- Archibald Prize - Tim Storrier for The Histrionic Wayfarer (after Bosch) (Self portrait)
- Artes Mundi Prize - Teresa Margolles
- Henry Hope Reed Award for classical art and design – Elizabeth Barlow Rogers
- Hugo Boss Prize – Danh Vo
- John Moores Painting Prize - Sarah Pickstone for "Stevie Smith and the Willow"

== Films ==
- Ai Weiwei: Never Sorry
- Girl With Black Balloons
- Mark Lombardi - Death-Defying Acts of Art and Conspiracy

== Deaths ==
- January 1
  - Jan Groover, 68, American photographer
  - Hermann Guggiari, 87, Paraguayan sculptor
- January 3 – Winifred Milius Lubell, 97, American illustrator and writer
- January 4 – Eve Arnold, 99, American photographer
- January 19 – Peter de Francia, 90, French-English painter and illustrator
- January 31
  - Mike Kelley (body found on this date), 57, American artist and musician (Destroy All Monsters)
  - Dorothea Tanning, 101, American surrealist painter, printmaker, and sculptor.
- February 3 – Jorge Glusberg, 79, Argentine author and director of the Museo Nacional de Bellas Artes MNBA
- February 4 – Susanne Suba, 98, Hungarian-born American watercolorist and illustrator.
- February 6
  - Yasuhiro Ishimoto, 91, Japanese-American photographer
  - Antoni Tàpies, 88, Spanish painter, sculptor and art theorist.
- February 8- Theophilus Brown, 92, American painter
- February 18 – Matt Lamb, 79, American painter
- February 24 – Kenneth Price, 77, American ceramicist, sculptor
- March 8 – Minoru Mori, 77, Japanese founder of the Mori Art Museum
- March 16 – Anita Steckel, 82, American feminist artist
- March 27 – Hilton Kramer, 84, American art critic
- April 2 – Elizabeth Catlett, 96, American born Mexican sculptor and printmaker
- April 6 – Thomas Kinkade, 54, American painter
- April 9
  - Richard Beyer, 86, American sculptor
  - John Golding, 82, British artist, art scholar and curator
- April 12 – John Weaver, 92, Canadian sculptor
- April 19 - Enrico Pedrini, 72, Italian academic, theorist, and art collector
- April 25- Louis le Brocquy, 95, Irish painter
- April 27 – David Weiss (Fischli & Weiss), 65, Swiss artist
- May 2 - Bram Bogart, 90, Dutch born Belgian painter
- May 11 – Tony DeZuniga, 79, Filipino illustrator
- May 15 – George Wyllie, 90, Scottish artist
- May 30 – Barton Lidice Beneš, 69, American artist
- June 9 – Paul Jenkins, 88, American painter
- June 10 – Georges Mathieu, 91, French painter
- June 20 – LeRoy Neiman, 91, American painter
- June 22 – Mary Fedden, 96, British painter
- June 28 – Ivan Karp, 86, American art dealer
- July 22 – Herbert Vogel, 89, American art collector
- July 25 – Franz West, 65, Austrian painter and sculptor
- July 26 – Karl Benjamin, 86, American painter
- July 28 – Adam Cullen, 46, Australian painter
- August 6 – Robert Hughes, 74, Australian-born art critic
- August 9 – Jan Sawka, 65, Polish-born American artist and architect
- August 21 – Hans Josephsohn, 92, German-born Swiss sculptor
- September 8 – Mario Armond Zamparelli, 81, American artist and designer
- September 11 – Tony Goldman, 68, American real estate developer, art impresario, and preservationist
- September 14 – Don Binney, 72, New Zealand painter
- September 29 – Mark Wiener, 61, American painter
- October 6 – Raoul De Keyser, Belgian painter
- October 11 – Edgar Negret, 92, Colombian sculptor
- October 15 - Michael Asher, 69, American conceptual artist
- October 30 – Lebbeus Woods, 72, American artist and architect
- November 13 – Will Barnet, 101, American painter
- November 16 – William Turnbull, 90, Scottish artist
- November 17 – Arnaud Maggs, 86, Canadian artist and photographer
- December 15 – Jeffrey Potter, 94, writer, authored a biography of Jackson Pollock
- December 20 – Robert Juniper, 83, Australian artist
- December 29 – Edward Meneeley, 85, American painter, sculptor and printmaker
