= Great Blue Heron (disambiguation) =

The great blue heron is a large wading bird in the heron family.

Great Blue Heron may also refer to:

- The Great Blue Heron Casino, a casino in Port Perry, Ontario, Canada
- The Great Blue Heron Music Festival, a music festival in Sherman, New York, United States
- Great Blue Heron (sculpture), a sculpture in Eugene, Oregon, United States
