= Guy Brett =

British art critic and curator (1942–2021)

- Born: 1942; Richmond, Yorkshire, England
- Died: 2021 (aged 78)
- Education: Eton College
- Occupations: Art critic; writer; curator
- Father: Lionel Brett, 4th Viscount Esher

Guy Anthony Baliol Brett (1942–2021) was an English art critic, writer and curator. He was noted for a personal vision, particularly of cultural production of an experimental character. He is known for the promotion of Latin American artists, and for drawing attention to kinetic art during the 1960s in Europe and Latin America.

== Life ==
Born in Richmond, Yorkshire, he was the son of Lionel Brett, 4th Viscount Esher and his wife Helena Christian Pike, a painter. He was educated at Eton College.

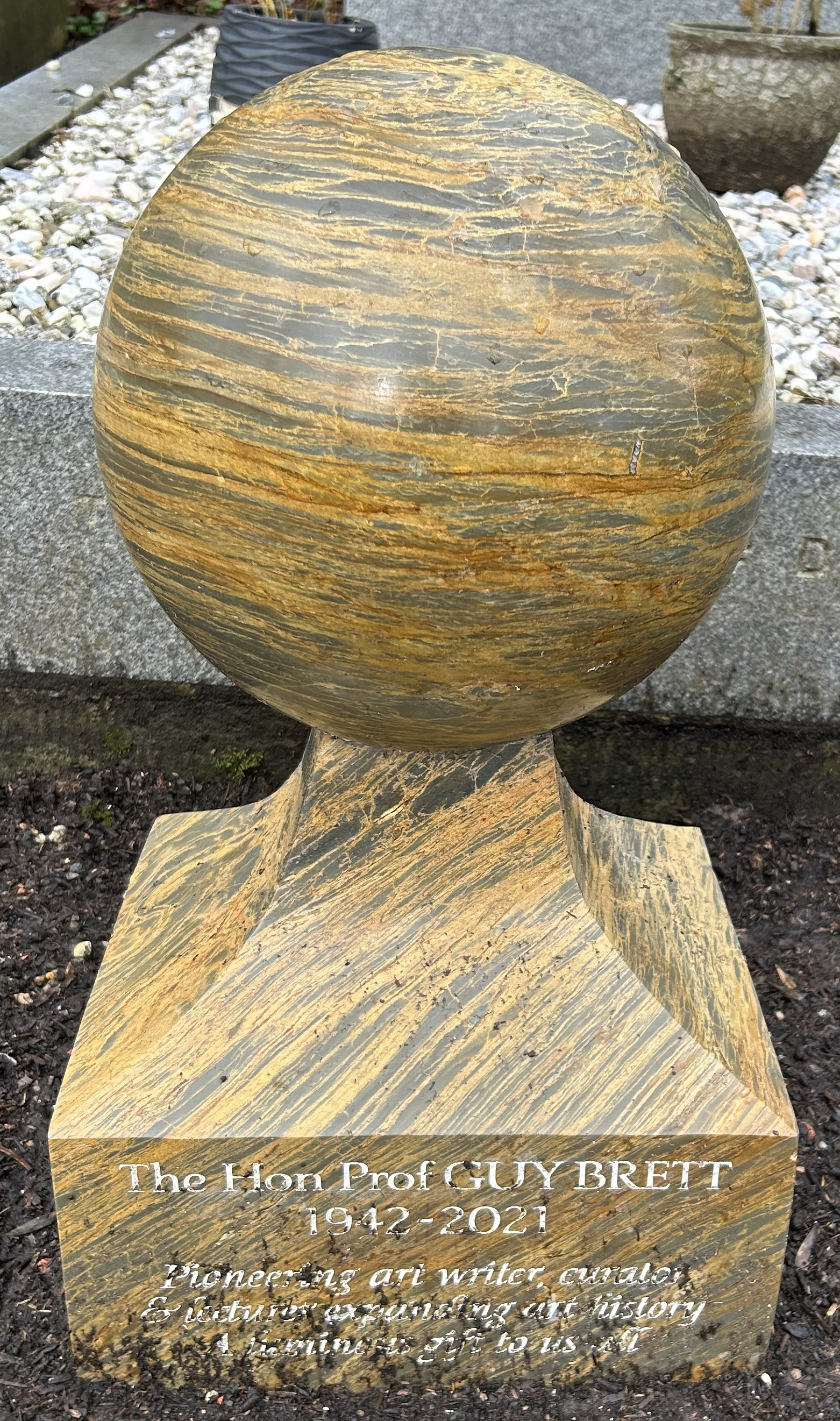
Grave of Guy Brett in Highgate Cemetery

Brett began his writing career with art criticism for The Guardian (1963–1964). In 1964, he started his publishing connection with the Signals Newsbulletin. He was art critic for The Times from 1964 to 1975. In 1974, Brett went to Hu County (Huxian) in the People's Republic of China to meet artists, in connection with an official exhibition Peasant Painters of Hu County. He was then employed by the British Arts Council to write English text and a catalogue for the show. John Higgins of The Times not long after detected a political streak in Brett's journalism, and dismissed him. Brett was Visual Arts Editor of City Limits from 1981 to 1983.

In 1979–80, Brett taught as guest lecturer at Goldsmiths College in London. He died in 2021 of Parkinson's disease and pneumonia and was buried at Highgate Cemetery. He is survived by his wife and children.

== Gallerist and curator ==
Brett early found a direction with his involvement in the gallery Signals London (active 1964–6). There a group of kinetic artists formed, brought together around Brett, David Medalla and Paul Keeler. The gallery grew out of the Centre for Advanced Creative Study (CACS), run in 1964 in Cornwall Gardens, London, from the flat shared by Keeler and Medalla. Supported also by Gustav Metzger and Marcello Salvadori, CACS moved in November 1964 to premises at 39 Wigmore Street owned by Paul's father Charles, renamed as Signals London. It took that name from works of kinetic sculpture by Takis. Signals showed Sérgio de Camargo, Lygia Clark, Li Yuan-chia, Hélio Oiticica, Jesús Rafael Soto and Mira Schendel, as well as Takis. When Signals closed in 1966 it left some legacy of artists with the Indica Gallery of John Dunbar and Barry Miles.

It was meeting Camargo in Paris in 1964 that led Brett to write on Brazilian art. He started to correspond with Schendel in 1965. That year, Brett and Keeler met Hélio Oiticica in Rio de Janeiro. The plan to mount a solo show for him survived the closure of Signals. In 1969 Brett gave major support to Oiticica by curating in London, at the Whitechapel Gallery, an exhibition of his work dubbed by the artist the "Whitechapel Experiment", though officially it was "Eden".

In Motion (1966) was an Arts Council-funded touring kinetic art exhibition, curated by Brett, his first large show. Works were included by Clark, Medalla, Takis, Pol Bury and Jean Tinguely. With Vicente Todolí he co-curated the Tate Modern 2008/9 exhibition for Cildo Meireles.

== Activist ==
Brett was co-founder in the 1970s of the group Artists for Democracy (AFD), following the 1973 Chilean coup d'état. The other founding members in 1973–4 were John Dugger, David Medalla and Cecilia Vicuña. One of the participants was Rasheed Araeen. An AFD exhibition in 1974 received backing from the Chilean academic and diplomat Álvaro Bunster, Harald Edelstam and Judith Hart. It was at an AFD meeting in 1976 that Gavin Jantjes met Barry Barker of the Institute of Contemporary Arts and was able to exhibit there. Brett himself met Alejandra Altamirano at an AFD event in 1974 — they were married in 1978.

== Works ==
- Kinetic Art: the Language of Movement (1968)
- Peasant Paintings from Hu County, Shensi Province, China (1976), editor Hugh Shaw
- Through Our Own Eyes: Popular Art and Modern History (1986)
- Transcontinental (1990). For Brett's exhibition Transcontinental: Nine Latin American Artists at the Ikon Gallery and Cornerhouse, including works by Waltércio Caldas, Juan Davila, Roberto Evangelista, Jac Leirner, Cildo Meireles and Tunga. The book covers also Eugenio Dittborn, Victor Grippo and Regina Vater.
- Exploding Galaxies: The Art of David Medalla (1995)
- Mona Hatoum (1997)
- Force Fields: An Essay on the Kinetic Art (2000), for the show Force Fields: Phases of the Kinetic he curated at the Hayward Gallery.
- Li Yuan-chia: tell me what is not said yet (2001)
- Carnival of Perception: Selected Writings on Art (2004)
- Brasil Experimental: Arte/Vida Proposições e Paradoxos (2005)
- Oiticica in London (2007)
- The Crossing of Innumerable Paths: Essays on Art (2019)
- Takis (2019), Tate Modern exhibition book, curator with Michael Wellen

Brett wrote further monographic essays on artists. One on Rasheed Araeen appeared as introduction to Araeen's Making Myself Visible (1984). Others treated included Derek Boshier, Lygia Clark, Rose Finn-Kelcey, Brion Gysin, Susan Hiller, Tina Keane, Ghisha Koenig, Lygia Pape and Aubrey Williams. Brett contributed to the short-lived magazine Black Phoenix in 1978, run by Araeen and Mahmood Jamal, and then its successor Third Text edited by Araeen from 1987.
