= List of Colección Patricia Phelps de Cisneros publications =

List of Colección Patricia Phelps de Cisneros publications is a collection of exhibition catalogs, scholarly works, and ebooks focused on Latin American art published by Colección Patricia Phelps de Cisneros (CPPC), a privately held Latin American art collection organization founded by Patricia Phelps de Cisneros and Gustavo Cisneros based in Venezuela and New York City.

== History ==
Since the 1990s, the Colección Patricia Phelps de Cisneros was created with a goal of bringing visibility and impact to the way Latin American art history is viewed and appreciated both on a regional and international level. As part of its four-pronged approach, CPPC lends artworks often in traveling exhibitions held at major institutional partners with accompanying exhibition catalogs that include essays, manifestos, and bibliographic profiles. CPPC works with scholars and academics to learn more about the artists and their works, and has established a prolific publications program to provide supporting information about the artists and their work, in addition to building an online forum for the artwork.

== Impact ==
The publication program of Colección Patricia Phelps de Cisneros that is represented here is unique in its international and pan-regional scope. Works are typically published in multiple languages, often within the same publication. The publications are oftentimes the first time the collection and curation of information about certain artists and regional and national art movements are published. Contributors are established art historians, curators, and often the artists who are working within or are part of the art movements themselves. Art movement manifestos are published in their entirety, often with full translations, in accessible and/or digital format, sometimes for the first time.

CPPC has published over 60 publications and has released e-books as part of its Conversaciones series, which are also made available in e-book format.

== Publications ==
In chronological order

- García Castro, Alvaro; Benítez, Pedro (1999). La Hacienda Carabobo: Una pequeña historia de Turgua y del café en la segunda mitad del siglo XIX (in Spanish). Caracas: Fundación Cisneros. ISBN 978-9-806-45400-2. OCLC 45450670. Wikidata ()
- Orinoco-Parima: Comunidades indígenas del sur de Venezuela (Exhibition catalog) (in Spanish, English, and German). Venezuela: Fundación Cisneros. 1999. ISBN 978-9-806-45401-9. OCLC 45050393. Wikidata () – Catalog of an exhibition shown from 6 Aug. 1999 to 27 Feb. 2000 at the Kunst- und Ausstellungshalle der Bundesrepublik Deutschland in Bonn
- Oramas, Luis Pérez (May 2000). Hacia el siglo XX venezolano: Artes plásticas, academicismos, implantaciones y localidades = Toward 20th-Century Venezuelan Art (PDF) (Conference catalog) (in English and Spanish). Caracas: Fundación Cisneros. ISBN 978-9-800-76668-2. OCLC 924013071. Wikidata () – Conferencia en el ciclo Horizontes Constructivos: la perspectiva latinoamericana, Centro de estudios de la modernidad, Universidad de Texas en Austin / "Constructive Horizons: The Latin American Perspective" at Blanton Museum of Art, and the Center for the Study of Modernity of the University of Texas at Austin.
- Jiménez, Ariel (2000). La Tentación de la pureza. Un montaje en la Presidencia de la Organización Cisneros [Cuaderno 2] (in Spanish). Caracas: Fundación Cisneros. ISBN 978-9-800-76667-5. OCLC 930547093. Wikidata ()
- Pérez-Oramas, Luis (2000). Ceci n'est pas un satellite = "Esto no es un satelite": obras contemporáneas de la CPPC en el centro de transmisión satelital VBC de DirecTV Venezuela (in Spanish). Caracas: Fundación Cisneros. ISBN 978-9-800-76666-8. OCLC 48223500. Wikidata ()
- Phelps, John (2001). Benítez, Pedro (ed.). William H. Phelps en la memoria de su nieto John Phelps (in Spanish). Caracas: Fundación Cisneros. ISBN 978-9-806-45403-3. Wikidata ()
- Delgado, Lelia; Ortega, Andrés (2001). Orinoco: Al Encuentro de Los Indígenas de la Amazonia Venezolana (Exhibition catalog) (in Spanish and French). Biarritz: Fundación Cisneros. ISBN 978-2-951-71190-7. OCLC 51139949. Wikidata () – Exposition held at The Bellevue, Biarritz, France, 11 July-7 October 2001
- Duarte, Carlos F. (2001). La Vida Cotidiana en Venezuela durante el Período Hispánico (in Spanish). Caracas: Fundación Cisneros. ISBN 978-9-806-45406-4. OCLC 434438566. Wikidata ()
- Bois, Yve-Alain (2001). Geometric Abstraction: Latin American Art from the Patricia Phelps de Cisneros Collection = Abstracción Geométrica: Arte Latinoamericano en la Colección Patricia Phelps de Cisneros (Exhibition catalog) (in English and Spanish). New Haven, CT: Yale University Press. ISBN 978-0-300-08990-5. OCLC 298342818. Wikidata () – Exhibition at the Fogg Art Museum, Cambridge, MA, 3 March-4 November 2001
- Muntada Torrellas, Anna (2001). Misal rico de Cisneros (in Spanish). Madrid: Real Fundación de Toledo. ISBN 978-8-460-44713-9. OCLC 60697402. Wikidata ()
- García Castro, Álvaro A. (documentación y estudio introductorio) (2002). Auguste Morisot: Un Pintor en el Orinoco, 1886-1887 (in Spanish). Caracas: Fundación Cisneros. ISBN 978-9-584-20329-8. OCLC 51927885. Wikidata ()
- García Castro, Alvaro A. (documentación y estudio introductorio) (2002). Diario de Auguste Morisot (1886-1887): Exploración de dos franceses a las fuentes del Orinoco (PDF) (in English and Spanish). Caracas: Fundación Cisneros. ISBN 978-9-584-20330-4. OCLC 52576751. Wikidata ()
- Jiménez, Ariel; Araujo, Carmen Cecilia (projeto museográfico) (2002). Paralelos: Arte Brasileira da Segunda Metade do Século XX em Contexto: Colección Cisneros (Exhibition catalog) (in Portuguese and English). Caracas: Fundación Cisneros. ISBN 978-9-806-45411-8. OCLC 855952240. Wikidata () – Catalog of an exhibition held at Museu de Arte Moderna de São Paulo, March 23-June 16, 2002
- Jiménez, Ariel (2002). Utopías Americanas: Conferencia en el Ciclo Horizontes Costructivos: La Perspectiva Latinoamericana = American Utopias: Constructive Horizons. The Latin American Perspective (PDF) (Exhibition catalog) (in English and Spanish). Caracas: Fundación Cisneros. ISBN 978-9-800-76669-9. OCLC 47774666. Wikidata () – Centro de Estudios de la Modernidad, Universidad de Texas en Austin = Cisneros Collection, Jack S. Blanton Museum of Art, Center of Study of Modernity, University of Texas at Austin
- Shiff, Richard (2003). Inacabado y Abstraído: Paul Cézanne, pintor del siglo viente a pesar de sí mismo = Unfinished and Abstracted: Paul Cézanne, Twentieth-Century Painter in Spite of Himself (Exhibition catalog) (in Spanish and English). Translated by Delmont, Juan Luis. Caracas: Fundación Cisneros. ISBN 978-9-806-45414-9. OCLC 173494788. Wikidata () – Academic conference at Museo de Bellas Artes, Caracas in 2003.
- Castro, Álvaro García (2003). Manaka en el corazón del Orinoco (in Spanish). Caracas: Fundación Cisneros. ISBN 978-9-806-45407-1. OCLC 433017779. Wikidata ()
- Jiménez, Ariel; Soto, Jesús Rafael (2003). Conversaciones con Jesús Soto (in Spanish). Caracas: Fundación Cisneros. ISBN 978-9-806-45404-0. OCLC 54686234. Wikidata ()
  - Jiménez, Ariel; Soto, Jesús Rafael (2005). Conversaciones con Jesús Soto (in Spanish and English). Caracas: Fundación Cisneros. ISBN 978-0-300-11587-1. OCLC 470210610. Wikidata ()
- Jiménez, Ariel; Kalenberg, Ángel (2003). GEO-METRÍAS. Abstracción Geométrica Latinoamericana en la Colección Cisneros (MNAV) (Exhibition catalog) (in Spanish). Caracas: Fundación Cisneros. ISBN 978-9-806-45413-2. OCLC 750573858. Wikidata () – Catalogue of an exhibition held in 2003 at the Museo Nacional de Artes Visuales (MNAV) de Montevideo
  - Jiménez, Ariel (2003). GEO-METRÍAS. Abstracción Geométrica Latinoamericana en la Colección Cisneros (MALBA) (Exhibition catalog) (in Spanish and English). Caracas: Fundación Cisneros. ISBN 978-9-879-76774-0. OCLC 52823665. Wikidata () – Catalogue of an exhibition held in 2003 at the Museo de Arte Latinoamericano de Buenos Aires (MALBA), 14 March-19 May 2003.
- Rivas, Jorge (2003). Arte del período hispánico venezolano en la Hacienda Carabobo (in Spanish and English). Caracas: Fundación Cisneros. OCLC 47809882. Wikidata ()
- Duarte, Carlos F. (2003). Historia de la casa natal de Simón Bolívar (in Spanish). Caracas: Fundación Cisneros. ISBN 978-9-806-45415-6. OCLC 56352318. Wikidata ()
- Amor, Mónica; Auerbach, Ruth; Montenegro, Guadalupe; Núñez, Josefina; Pérez-Oramas, Luis; Peruga, Iris (2003). Gego: Obra Completa, 1955-1990 (Exhibition catalog) (in Spanish and English). Caracas: Fundación Cisneros. ISBN 978-9-806-45405-7. OCLC 54503903. Wikidata () – Catalog of an exhibition held at the Museo de Bellas Artes, Caracas, November 2000 - April, 2001. Preparado por la Fundación Museo de Bellas Artes, con la colaboracíon y asistencia de la Fundación Gego en ocasión de la exposición Gego 1955-1990 que se presentó en el Museo de Ballas Artes de Caracas en noviembre del 2000 a abril del 2001
- Pérez-Oramas, Luis (2004). Arte contemporáneo venezolano en la Colección Cisneros (1990-2004) – Museo de Arte Moderno Jesús Soto (Exhibition catalog) (in Spanish). Caracas: Fundación Cisneros. OCLC 173494791. Wikidata () – Catalog of an exhibition held at Museo de Arte Moderno Jesus Soto in 2004-2005.
- Delgado, Lelia; González Niño, Edgardo (fotografías) (2004). Vida indígena en el Orinoco (in Spanish). Caracas: Fundación Cisneros. ISBN 978-9-584-21021-0. OCLC 836350605. Wikidata ()
- Jiménez, Ariel (2004). DIÁLOGOS. Arte Latinoamericano desde la Colección Cisneros (MNBA, Chile) (Exhibition catalog) (in Spanish). Santiago de Chile: Museo Nacional de Bellas Artes. ISBN 978-9-806-45418-7. OCLC 953873502. Wikidata () – Catálogo de exposição realizada no Museo Nacional de Bellas Artes de Santiago, no Chile, de novembro de 2004 a fevereiro de 2005
  - Jiménez, Ariel (2004). DIÁLOGOS. Arte Latinoamericano desde la Colección Cisneros (Museo de Arte de Lima) (Exhibition catalog) (in Spanish). Caracas: Fundación Cisneros. ISBN 978-9-806-45416-3. OCLC 953870042. Wikidata () – Exhibition catalog Museo de Arte de Lima, Peru (July–September 2004)
  - Jiménez, Ariel (2005). DIÁLOGOS. Arte Latinoamericano desde la Colección Cisneros (MAMBO) (Exhibition catalog) (in Spanish). Caracas: Fundación Cisneros. OCLC 70292338. Wikidata () – Exhibition catalog Museo de Arte Moderna de Bogotá, May 5-June 29, 2005
- Rivas P., Jorge F. (2004). Devoción Privada. Pintura Religiosa de Pequeño Formato en Venezuela Durante el Periodo Hispánico, Siglos XVIII y XIX (Exhibition catalog) (in Spanish). Caracas: Fundación Cisneros. OCLC 180205438. Wikidata ()
- Pérez Oramas, Luis (2005). Arte contemporáneo venezolano en la Colección Cisneros (1990–2004) – Centro de Arte de Maracaibo Lía Bermúdez (Exhibition catalog) (in Spanish). Caracas: Fundación Cisneros. OCLC 65170039. Wikidata () – Catalog of an exhibition held at Centro de Arte de Maracaibo Lía Bermúdez, July 14-Oct. 2, 2005.
- Pérez-Oramas, Luis (2005). La Resistencia de las sombras: Alejandro Otero y Gego (in Spanish and English). Caracas: Fundación Cisneros. ISBN 978-9-806-45419-4. OCLC 836569702. Wikidata ()
- Delgado, Lelia; Koch, Kelsy; Brewer-Carías, Charles; González Niño, Edgardo; Rojas, Carlos German (2005). Orinoco – Venezuelan Indian life in the Amazonian region (Exhibition catalog) (in Russian and English). Caracas: Fundación Cisneros. ISBN 978-9-806-45422-4. OCLC 938391666. Wikidata () – Exhibition at the Russian Academy of Sciences, St. Petersburg, December 2005-November 2006.
- Rivas P., Jorge F. (2007). El repertorio clásico en el mobiliario venezolano, siglos XVIII y XIX = The Classical Repertoire in Eighteenth and Nineteenth Century Venezuelan Furniture (PDF) (in Spanish and English). Caracas: Fundación Cisneros. ISBN 978-9-806-45426-2. OCLC 234086335.
- Jiménez, Ariel (curaduría); Jiménez, Ariel; Pérez-Ratton, Virginia (2006). Ecos y Contrastes. Arte Contemporáneo en la Colección Cisneros (in Spanish). Caracas: Fundación Cisneros. ISBN 978-9-806-45423-1. OCLC 84669791. Wikidata () – Museo de Arte y Diseño Contemporáneo, San José, Costa Rica, 7 de diciembre de 2005 al 25 de febrero de 2006; Museo de Arte de El Salvador, San Salvador, El Salvador, 4 de abril al 24 de junio de 2006; a contra corriente, Mira Schendel, Gego y Lygia Pape: obras de la Colección Cisneros, TEOR/éTica, San José, Costa Rica, 7 de diciembre de 2005 al 19 febrero de 2006
- Fuentes, Carlos; Jiménez, Ariel (curaduría); Pérez-Oramas, Luis; Iturbe, Mercedes; Peruga, Iris; Nelson, Adele; Koch, Kelsy (coord. y edición del catálogo); Santana, Rafael (coord. y edición del catálogo); Herrera, Laura (coord. y edición del catálogo); Gallinoto, María E. (tr.) (2006). Cruce de Miradas. Visiones de América Latina: Colección Patricia Phelps de Cisneros (in Spanish). México, D.F.: Museo del Palacio de Bellas Artes. ISBN 978-9-685-89333-6. OCLC 166522624. Wikidata () – Catalog of an exhibition held at the Museo del Placio de Bellas Artes, Mexico City, Aug. 2-Oct. 22, 2006
- Da Antonio, Francisco; Monroy, Douglas; Niño Araque, Esmeralda; Romero D., Rafael A.; Salas, Alejandro; Vaamonde Berrizbeitia, Clementina, eds. (2005). Diccionario biográfico de las artes visuales en Venezuela (in Spanish). Caracas: Fundación Galería de Arte Nacional. ISBN 978-9-806-42018-2. OCLC 62892594. Wikidata () – 2 volume set
- Pérez Oramas, Luis (2006). The Rhythm of Color: Alejandro Otero and Willys de Castro, Two Modern Masters in the Colección Patricia Phelps de Cisneros (in English and Spanish). Caracas / Aspen, CO: Fundación Cisneros / The Aspen Institute. OCLC 181630795. Wikidata () – Exhibition held June 29-November 1, 2006
- Soto, Jesús Rafael; Palacios, Carlos E. (curaduría y texto) (2006). Jesús Soto en la Colección Patricia Phelps de Cisneros: Una selección (Exhibition catalog) (in Spanish). Caracas, Venezuela: Fundación Cisneros. OCLC 620347798. Wikidata () – 16 de febrero al 6 de abril de 2006, Instituto de Estudios Superiores de Administración, IESA, Caracas, Venezuela
- Phelps de Cisneros, Patricia; Rivas P., Jorge F.; Ugarte, María (2007). De Oficio Pintor: Arte Colonial Venezolano: Colección Patricia Phelps de Cisneros (Exhibition catalog) (in Spanish and English). Santiago de los Caballeros, República Dominicana / Caracas, Venezuela: Centro León / Fundación Cisneros. ISBN 978-9-945-85964-5. OCLC 213457444. Wikidata () – Catálogo de la exposición del mismo nombre celebrada en Santiago de los Caballeros, República Dominicana, del 21 de junio al 16 de septiembre. Catalog of an exhibition held at Centro León, Santiago de los Caballeros, Dominican Republic, Jun. 21-Sept. 16, 2007
- Pérez-Barreiro, Gabriel, ed. (2007). The Geometry of Hope (Exhibition catalog) (in English and Spanish). Austin: Blanton Museum of Art, University of Texas at Austin. ISBN 978-0-977-14536-2. OCLC 497031205. Wikidata () – Published on the occasion of the exhibition held Feb. 20-Apr. 22, 2007, Blanton Museum of Art, Austin, and Sept. 12-Dec. 8, 2007, Grey Art Gallery, New York University, New York
- Palacios, Carlos E.; Pino, María Esther (2008). Correspondences: Contemporary Art from the Colección Patricia Phelps De Cisneros (Exhibition catalog). Caracas, Venezuela / Norton, Massachusetts: Fundación Cisneros / Wheaton College. ISBN 978-0-980-18740-3. OCLC 233835779. Wikidata () – Catalog of an exhibition held at the Beard and Weil Galleries, Wheaton College, Norton, Mass., Feb. 4-Apr. 10, 2008
- Elderfield, John; Jiménez, Ariel (2010). Pérez-Barreiro, Gabriel (ed.). A Constructive Vision: Latin American Abstract Art from the Colección Patricia Phelps de Cisneros (in Spanish and English). New York: Fundación Cisneros. ISBN 978-0-982-35440-7. OCLC 639160816. Wikidata ()
- Jiménez, Ariel; Herkenhoff, Paulo (2010). Desenhar no Espaço: Artistas Abstratos do Brasil e da Venezuela na Coleção Patricia Phelps de Cisneros (PDF) (Exhibition catalog) (in Portuguese, English, and Spanish). Porto Alegre, Brazil: Fundação Iberê Camargo. ISBN 978-85-89680-16-5. OCLC 722764644. Archived from the original (PDF) on 2016-04-02. Wikidata () – Catalog of an exhibition held at Fundação Iberê Camargo, Porto Alegre, Brazil, July 29-Oct. 31, 2010 and at Pinacoteca do Estado de São Paulo, São Paulo, Brazil, Nov. 27, 2010-Jan. 30, 2011
- Suárez, Osbel; García, María Amalia (2011). Witschey, Erica; Fundación Juan March (eds.). Cold America: Geometric Abstraction in Latin América (1934–1973) (Exhibition catalog). Translated by Agnew, Michael. Madrid: Fundación Juan March. ISBN 978-84-7075-588-0. OCLC 707460289. Wikidata () – Exhibition catalog of Cold America, Geometric Abstraction in Latin America (1934–1973), Fundación Juan March, Madrid, February 11-May 15, 2011
  - Torres-García, Joaquín (2011). "Vouloir construire / The Will to Construct". Cold America: Geometric Abstraction in Latin América (1934–1973) (Exhibition catalog). Madrid: Fundación Juan March. pp. 406–407. ISBN 978-84-7075-588-0. OCLC 707460289. Wikidata () – This catalogue and its Spanish edition are published on the occasion of the exhibition
- Suárez, Osbel; García, María Amalia (2011). Witschey, Erica; Fundación Juan March (eds.). América fría. La abstracción geométrica en Latinoamerica (1934–1973) (Exhibition catalog) (in Spanish). Translated by Agnew, Michael. Madrid: Fundación Juan March. ISBN 978-8-470-75586-6. OCLC 810113820. Wikidata () – Folleto de la expoción celebrada América fría. La abstracción geométrica en Latinoamerica (1934–1973) en la Fundación Juan March en Madrid del 11 de febrero al 15 de mayo de 2011
- Pérez-Barreiro, Gabriel; Borja-Villel, Manuel (2013). Concrete Invention: Colección Patricia Phelps De Cisneros: Reflections on Geometric Abstraction from Latin America and Its Legacy (Exhibition catalog). Madrid: Museo Nacional Centro de Arte Reina Sofía/Turner. ISBN 978-8-415-42797-1. OCLC 828897697. Wikidata () – Published on the occasion of an exhibition of the same name held at Museo Nacional Centro de Arte Reina Sofía, Madrid, Spain, January 22-September 16, 2013
- Pérez-Barreiro, Gabriel; Borja-Villel, Manuel J. (2013). La invención concreta: Colección Patricia Phelps de Cisneros: Reflexiones en torno a la abstracción géometrica latinoamercana y sus legados (in Spanish). Madrid: Turner. ISBN 978-8-415-42796-4. OCLC 984797807. Wikidata () – Obra publicada con motivo de la exposición homónima celebrada en el Museo Reina Sofía del 22 de enero al 16 de septiembre de 2013
- Delgado, Lelia; Ortega Mendoza, Andrés; Brewer-Carías, Charles; Cobo Gradín, Fernando; de Arce Andratschke, Alejandro (2013). Orinoco. Viaxe a un mundo perdido. Unha Colección da Fundación Cisneros (in Spanish, English, and Galician). Santiago de Compostela: Fundación Cidade da Cultura de Galicia. ISBN 978-8-445-35083-6. OCLC 878067166. Wikidata () – Catalogue qui accompagne une exposition de la "Fundación Cisneros Orinoco Collection", tenu au "Museo Centro Gaiás" dans la "Cidade da Cultura de Galicia."
- Aste, Richard; Rivas Pérez, Jorge F.; Stratton-Pruitt, Suzanne L.; Brown, Michael A.; Bagneris, Mia L. (2013). Aste, Richard (ed.). Behind Closed Doors: Art in the Spanish American Home, 1492-1898. Brooklyn, NY: Brooklyn Museum. ISBN 978-0-872-73172-1. OCLC 825046947. Wikidata () – Published in conjunction with an exhibition organized by and held at the Brooklyn Museum, Sept. 20, 2013-Jan. 12, 2014. Also held at the Albuquerque Museum of Art and History, Feb. 16-May 18, 2014, New Orleans Museum of Art, Jun. 20-Sept. 21, 2014, and the John and Mable Ringling Museum of Art, Oct. 17, 2014-Jan. 11, 2015
- Gullar, Ferreira; Itamar Harrison, Marguerite (2013). An Ordinary Man (ebook) (in Portuguese and English). Translated by Guyer, Leland. Caracas/New York: Colección Patricia Phelps de Cisneros. ISBN 978-0-988-20559-8. Wikidata ()
- Pérez-Barreiro, Gabriel; Locke, Adrian; Lea, Sarah; García, María Amalia; Whitelegg, Isobel (2014). Radical Geometry: Modern Art of South America from the Patricia Phelps de Cisneros Collection. London: Royal Academy of Arts. ISBN 978-1-907-53369-3. OCLC 889949567. Wikidata ()
- Diener, Pablo; Pérez-Oramas, Luis; Romero, Rafael (2015). Manthorne, Katherine (ed.). Traveler Artists: Landscapes of Latin America from the Patricia Phelps De Cisneros Collection (in English and Spanish). New York: Colección Patricia Phelps de Cisneros. ISBN 978-0-982-35441-4. OCLC 907811565. Wikidata ()
- Gottschaller, Pia; Le Blanc, Aleca (2017). Gottschaller, Pia; Le Blanc, Aleca; Gilbert, Zanna; Learner, Tom; Perchuk, Andrew (eds.). Making Art Concrete: Works from Argentina and Brazil in the Colección Patricia Phelps de Cisneros (Exhibition catalog). Los Angeles: Getty Conservation Institute and Getty Research Institute / Getty Publications. ISBN 978-1-606-06529-7. OCLC 982373712. Wikidata ()
- Phelps de Cisneros, Patricia; Hernández Chong Cuy, Sofía; Meadows, Sara (2019). Portadores de sentido: Arte contemporáneo en la Colección Patricia Phelps de Cisneros (PDF) (in Spanish and English). Caracas/New York: Fundación Cisneros/Colección Patricia Phelps de Cisneros. ISBN 978-0-9882055-5-0. OCLC 1122191892. Wikidata () – Catalog of an exhibition held at Museo Amparo in Puebla, Mexico (February–July 2019)

== Conversaciones/Conversations series ==
- Cruz-Diez, Carlos; Jiménez, Ariel; Pérez-Barreiro, Gabriel (Introduction by) (2010). Carlos Cruz-Diez in conversation with / en conversación con Ariel Jiménez (in English and Spanish). New York, NY/Caracas, Venezuela: Fundación Cisneros/Colección Patricia Phelps de Cisneros. ISBN 978-0-988-20551-2. OCLC 834610331. Wikidata ()
- Maldonado, Tomás; García, María Amalia; Crispiani, Alejandro (Introduction by) (2011). Tomás Maldonado in conversation with / en conversación con María Amalia García (in English and Spanish). New York, NY/Caracas, Venezuela: Fundación Cisneros/Colección Patricia Phelps de Cisneros. ISBN 978-0-988-20552-9. OCLC 867731687. Wikidata ()
- Leirner, Jac; Nelson, Adele; Storr, Robert (Introduction by) (2011). Jac Leirner in conversation with / en conversación con Adele Nelson (in English and Spanish). New York, NY/Caracas, Venezuela: Fundación Cisneros/Colección Patricia Phelps de Cisneros. ISBN 978-0-988-20553-6. OCLC 867730975. Wikidata ()
- Soto, Jesús; Jiménez, Ariel; Pérez-Barreiro, Gabriel (Introduction by) (2011). Jesús Soto in conversation with / en conversación con Ariel Jiménez (in English and Spanish). New York, NY/Caracas, Venezuela: Fundación Cisneros/Colección Patricia Phelps de Cisneros. ISBN 978-0-988-20554-3. OCLC 867732162. Wikidata ()
- Gullar, Ferreira; Jiménez, Ariel; Leal, Weydson B. (Introduction by) (2013). Ferreira Gullar in conversation with / en conversación con Ariel Jiménez (in English and Spanish). New York, NY/Caracas, Venezuela: Fundación Cisneros/Colección Patricia Phelps de Cisneros. ISBN 978-0-982-35445-2. OCLC 867574122. Wikidata ()
- Gyula, Kosice; Pérez-Barreiro, Gabriel; Giunta, Andrea (Introduction by) (2012). Gyula Kosice in conversation with / en conversación con Gabriel Pérez-Barreiro (in English and Spanish). New York, NY/Caracas, Venezuela: Fundación Cisneros/Colección Patricia Phelps de Cisneros. ISBN 978-0-988-20556-7. OCLC 867730385. Wikidata ()
- Porter, Liliana; Katzenstein, Inés; Volk, Gregory (Introduction by) (2013). Liliana Porter in conversation with / en conversación con Inés Katzenstein (in English and Spanish). New York, NY/Caracas, Venezuela: Fundación Cisneros/Colección Patricia Phelps de Cisneros. ISBN 978-0-982-35447-6. OCLC 934834918. Wikidata ()
- Camnitzer, Luis; Alberro, Alexander; Pérez-Barreiro, Gabriel (Introduction by) (2014). Luis Camnitzer in conversation with / en conversación con Alexander Alberro (in English and Spanish). New York, NY/Caracas, Venezuela: Fundación Cisneros/Colección Patricia Phelps de Cisneros. ISBN 978-0-984-01735-5. OCLC 942844214. Wikidata ()
- Caldas, Waltercio; Jiménez, Ariel; Brett, Guy (2016). Waltercio Caldas in conversation with / en conversación con Ariel Jiménez (in English and Spanish). New York, NY/Caracas, Venezuela: Fundación Cisneros/Colección Patricia Phelps de Cisneros. ISBN 978-0-984-01735-5. OCLC 948878970. Wikidata ()
- Davidovich, Jaime; Quiles, Daniel R.; Hanhardt, John G. (Introduction by) (2017). Jaime Davidovich in conversation with / En conversación con Daniel R. Quiles (in English and Spanish). New York, NY/Caracas, Venezuela: Fundación Cisneros/Colección Patricia Phelps de Cisneros and Institute for Studies on Latin American Art. ISBN 978-0-984-01736-2. OCLC 961156137. Wikidata ()

== Manifestos, art movement statements ==
- Torres-García, Joaquín (September 1934). Manifesto 1. Contestando a N. B. de la C.T.I.U. (in Spanish). Montevideo: Publicaciones de la Asociación de Arte Constructivo. pp. 408–409. Wikidata ()
