= Sérgio de Camargo =

Brazilian sculptor (1930–1990)

Sergio de Carmargo
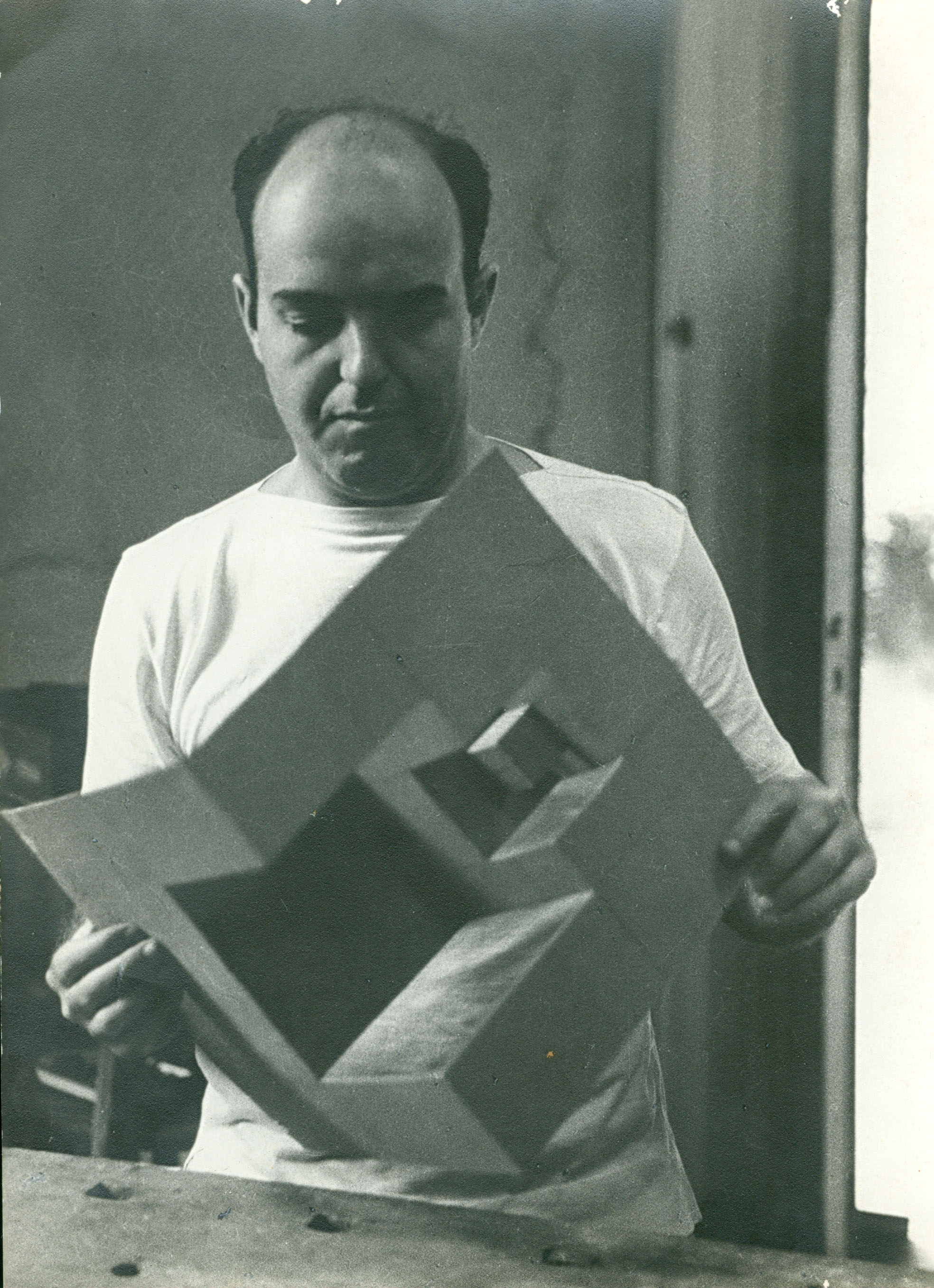
- Born: Sergio de Carmargo; April 8, 1930; Rio de Janeiro, Brazil
- Died: February 20, 1990 (aged 59); Rio de Janeiro, Brazil
- Known for: Art
- Movement: Neo-Concrete Constructivism, Kinetic Op Art, Constructivism
- Awards: International Sculpture Prize of the Paris Biennale

Sérgio de Camargo (April 8, 1930 – 1990) was a sculptor and relief maker, born in Rio de Janeiro, Brazil. Sergio De Camargo studied at the Academia Altamira in Buenos Aires under Emilio Pettoruti and Lucio Fontana. Camargo also studied philosophy at the Sorbonne in Paris. On a protracted trip through Europe in 1948, Camargo met Brâncuși, Arp, Henri Laurens and Georges Vantongerloo. Sérgio de Camargo showed work at numerous international exhibitions, including the 1965 São Paulo Biennale (where he won a gold medal), the 1966 Venice Biennale, and the 1968 documenta in Kassel. Sérgio de Camargo died in Rio de Janeiro in 1990. The Tate Gallery in London has one of de Camargo's work in their permanent collection.

== Early life and education ==
Sergio Camargo was born in Rio de Janeiro in 1930. Camargo began his art education at the Academia Altamira in Buenos Aires under Lucio Fontana and Emilio Pettoruti . He would later move to Paris in 1948, where he enrolled at the Academie de la Grand Chaumiere. He also studied at the Sorbonne, where he encountered the philosopher Gaston Bachelard. However, Camargo was most influenced by Constantin Brancusi’s study of the natural world through the lens of volumetric forms, which inspired his interest in the language of materials.

When Carmargo returned home to Brazil in the 1950s, he stumbled into the rising Neo-Concrete Constructivist and Kinetic Op Art movements. Camargo found that the volumetric forms captured the immaterial qualities of being. Ultimately playing with light and form to express feelings of existence.

In 1952-53 he again returned to Europe and went to China in 1954. Between 1961 and 1974 Sérgio de Camargo remained in Paris, where he became a member of the Groupe de Recherche d’Art Visuel (GRAV) in 1963. During that period he concentrated on structuring monochrome white surfaces some in "Polyhedral Volumes of Mutable Readings" using parallelepiped shapes and others with cylindrical wooden reliefs, in both cases proposing the play of lights and shadows alternating between order and chaos, fullness and emptiness. As retold by Guy Brett, a curator and friend:

“Cutting an apple to eat it, he sliced off nearly half and then made another cut at a different angle to take a piece out. The two planes made a simple relationship between light and shadow. Camargo grasped it; unconsciously, he had made the first cylindrical element. In the apple was the synthesis he had been working towards … the combination of a single element of substance (the rounded body of the apple) and direction (the plane he had just exposed). It is a synthesis of his thought and experience in a single sculptural sign”

It was from cutting this apple that Camargo was able to see how the refractions of light acted differently based on circumstance. This simple act would become the catalyst for his first painted wood reliefs. The wood reliefs, monochromatic in nature allowed for simple and repetitive logic with only subtle alterations. With such slight variations arranged across an otherwise flat plane, there became thousands of compositional possibilities. These wood reliefs communicated a specific message of light and its surroundings. Gaston Bachelard would frame it, light and shadow ‘inhabit’ the work such that it can ‘transcend geometrical space’.

== Breakthrough and early exhibitions ==
Carmargo received the International Sculpture Prize at the Paris Biennale in 1963. Camargo had continued success in Europe in 1964. His wood reliefs won him his first solo exhibition, at the Signals London gallery. The gallery went on to host some of Camargo's peers, such as Lygia Clark, Mira Schendel, and Hélio Oiticica. These artists and exhibitions shed light generally on the growing Brazilian contemporary art world.

In 1965, he found success in South America as well In 1965 Camargo would continue his success and recognition with his first solo museum exhibition at the Museu de Arte Modern do Rio de Janeiro. Additionally, he was named best national sculptor in the São Paulo Bienal. His employment of new materials is largely attributed to this success. With access to Carrara marble, Camargo began creating work of a much grander scale. Finally, Camargo could fully explore his ideas in a fully three-dimensional context. With this exploration of size and material, Camargo also decided to expand his library of geometric shapes to more prismatic elements that would pierce, project, and recede. His strongest examples can be seen in his commissions for the Centre Hospitalier Universitaire de Bordeaux-Pellegrin, and the Palacio Itamaraty, Brasilia. Also in 1965, he began sculptural pieces for Oscar Niemeyer's Foreign Ministry Building in Brasília.Eventually, by 1967, he contributed a monumental element to the site—a rhythmically structured 25 meter wall.

During the late 1960s Sérgio de Camargo showed work at numerous international exhibitions, including the 1965 São Paulo Biennale, the 1966 Venice Biennale, and the 1968 documenta in Kassel.

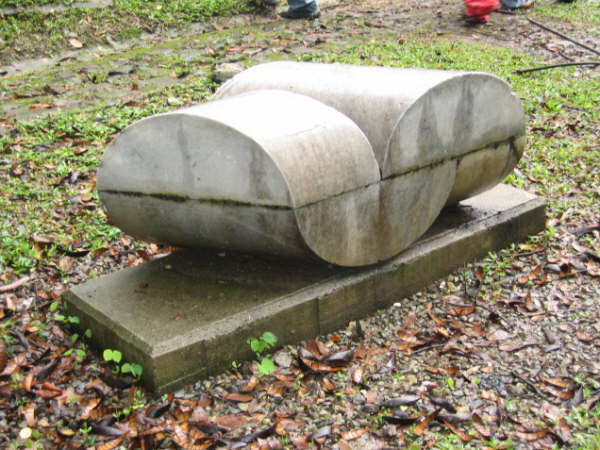
Marble sculpture in Sculpture Park, Nutibara, Medellín, Colombia

== Return to Brazil ==
Carmargo decided it was time to leave Europe and subsequently returned to Brazil in 1973. While Carmargo had been gone Brazil had been in a time of prosperity with the rise in exportation of newly found oil repositories. Carmargo’s return to Brazil would bring about a new phase within his practice. It is the later works of Carmargo’s that seem to be defined by a return to previous forms and experiments. In 1977 he won the sculpture award given by the São Paulo Association of Art Critics. In the 1980s his works largely returned to the original cylindrical forms, as well as shrinking in scale. Perhaps most significantly there was less conflict been form and volume. During this time Carmargo also began working with yet another new material, Belgian black marble. The artist’s interest in this material stemmed from its inherent ability to absorb light. This facet of the marble allowed Carmargo to use reflection in the same manner in which he once employed shadow. In the 1980s Camargo had solo exhibitions in both the Rio and São Paulo museums of modern art, and he participated in the 1982 Venice Biennale.

== Influence ==
One of the primary influences for Camargo was the constructivist art movement that was highly popular in Brazil during his time. Constructivist art was largely stimulated by the post-war economic boom and the rise of modernist trends in architecture. During the evolution of the Constructivist art movement, Sergio de Carmargo and his peers were inspired by two specific events, the establishment of the Biennial in 1951, and the inauguration of Brasilia in 1960. Artworks created during this period range widely in there different approaches to the rules of constructivist art. The contributions of these artists began a highly original period in the history of modernism. When it comes to the whole of Brazilian art there are few independent artists like Camargo that simplified an already complex visual language through his “highly iconoclastic approaches”. Brazilian constructivism lies within the need to have universal communion and communication. Artistically, Carmargo has often been linked to either the Neo-Concrete Constructivism or Op Art Kineticism art movements. He is often compared with his Brazilian colleagues, such as Lygia Clark, Mira Schendel, and Hélio Oiticica. However, Carmargo was never clearly aligned with any one movement. While Camargo’s work was distinctly a part of the constructivism movement he adapted the rules in order to more accurately communicate his thoughts. Camargo’s work has been linked due to its distinct reliance on simplicity, systems, and uniformity through volumetric elements and color. Critic Ronaldo Brito refers to Camargo’s work as “the madness of order”. Carmargo confronts the human perception of a paradigm and attempts to break understanding of the laws of the object. Camargo does not interrogate this subject in a conceptual realm but through the ever-changing effects of visual light. It is because of his unique style, that Camargo stands apart from his contemporary peers.

== Exhibitions ==
Camargo’s work is represented in the collections of the Albright-Knox Art Gallery, Buffalo, NY; Birmingham Museum of Art, AL; Centre national des arts plastiques, Paris; Dallas Museum of Art; Hirshhorn Museum and Sculpture Garden, Washington, DC; Kunstmuseum, Bern, Switzerland;Los Angeles County Museum of Art; Museum of Fine Arts, Houston; Museum of Modern Art, New York; and the Tate Modern, London. In 2000, the Paço Imperial, Rio de Janeiro, opened a permanent exhibition space for the artist, which includes a replica of his art studio in Jacarepaguá, Brazil. Camargo’s work has been the subject of major retrospectives at the Museu de Arte Moderna, Rio de Janeiro, in 1993; the Stedelijk Museum, Schiedam, in 1994; and the Instituto de Arte Contemporânea, São Paulo, in 2010, which traveled to the Museu Oscar Niemeyer, Curitiba, Brazil, in 2012.
