= Inversion: Plus Minus =

Pair of sculptures in Portland, Oregon

- The sculpture in 2016
- Artist: Annie Han; Daniel Mihalyo
- Year: 2012
- Type: Sculpture
- Medium: Weathered steel angle iron
- Location: Portland, Oregon; 45.5176°N 122.6620°W

Inversion: Plus Minus (sometimes stylized as Inversion +/-) is a pair of outdoor sculptures designed by artists and architects Annie Han and Daniel Mihalyo, located in southeast Portland, Oregon. The sculptures, constructed from weathered steel angle iron, are sited near the Morrison Bridge and Hawthorne Bridge along Southeast Grand Avenue and represent "ghosts" of former buildings. The installation on Belmont Street emphasizes "negative space" while the sculpture on Hawthorne Street appears as a more solid matrix of metal. According to the artists, the works are reminiscent of industrial buildings that existed on the project sites historically. Inversion was funded by the two percent for art ordinance as part of the expansion of the Eastside Portland Streetcar line and is managed by the Regional Arts & Culture Council.

== Description and history ==
Inversion: Plus Minus was designed by Annie Han and Daniel Mihalyo, artists and architects with Seattle-based Lead Pencil Studio and recipients of the 2007–2008 Rome Prize for Architecture from the American Academy in Rome. Han and Mihalyo had prior connections to Oregon; Han attended Portland's David Douglas High School and both studied at the University of Oregon's School of Architecture and Allied Arts. Inversion consists of two outdoor sculptures representing "ghosts" of former buildings. Both sculptures, constructed from weathered steel angle iron, are sited near the Morrison Bridge and Hawthorne Bridge along Southeast Grand Avenue. The Belmont Street installation features an outline of a "building", highlighting the work's "negative space". Conversely, the Hawthorne Street installation includes a metal matrix, appearing almost solid. According to Han and Mihalyo, "The sculptures reference the outer shells of ordinary industrial buildings found in the Central Eastside Industrial Area like those that once existed on the project sites."

Funding for the public art project was provided by the Percent for Art ordinance, which requires that two percent of publicly funded city construction projects be used for public art, as part of the expansion of the eastside Portland Streetcar line. The works were chosen by a panel of local artists and members of the community. According to one panelist, "We were looking for work that not only brought something new and unexpected but had an underlying narrative that spoke to the site—something very specific to the location and overall DNA of the neighborhood." The same panelist appreciated Inversion's historical aspects as well as the ability to interact with each sculpture at different times of the day. Another installation associated with this expansion included Jorge Pardo's sculptural shelter at the east end of the Burnside Bridge featuring "rain on the outside, sunshine on the inside". In August 2012, The Oregonian reported the installations would be completed by the end of the year. Han and Mihalyo resided in Portland and rented a fabrication shop during the project's implementation. Inversion is managed by the Regional Arts & Culture Council.

== See also ==
- 2012 in art
- List of Fellows of the American Academy in Rome 1991–2010
