= Great Blue Heron (sculpture) =

Sculpture in Eugene, Oregon, U.S.

- The sculpture in 2015
- Artist: Jud Turner
- Year: 2012
- Type: Sculpture
- Medium: Recycled materials; steel
- Subject: Great blue heron
- Dimensions: 4.9 m (16 ft)
- Location: Eugene, Oregon, United States; 44.045467°N 123.080110°W

Great Blue Heron is an outdoor 2012 sculpture by Jud Turner, installed at the intersection of East 13th Avenue and Alder Street in Eugene, Oregon, in the United States. The 16-foot (4.9 m) sculpture is made of fifty percent recycled materials and fifty percent new steel. It was unveiled on October 18, 2012, two days before Eugene's 150th birthday. The work was commissioned by The Duck Store, the University of Oregon, and the City of Eugene.

== See also ==
- 2012 in art
