= David Breuer-Weil =

English painter

- Born: 1965 (age 60–61)

David Breuer-Weil (born 1965) is an artist from London whose work is exhibited worldwide. He works in different media including large canvases and monumental bronze sculptures.

== Biography ==
David Breuer-Weil studied at Central Saint Martins College of Art and Design, London from 1985 and was taught by Shelley Faussett, one of Henry Moore's assistants. He later studied English literature at Clare College, Cambridge. Following graduation, he was awarded a bursary at Sotheby's, where he was trained in various departments.

Breuer-Weil has emerged as one of the leading contemporary British sculptors. Iconic works, including Brothers and Alien have been displayed to great public and critical acclaim. Breuer-Weil’s monumental sculptures have been installed in major public spaces in London including Hampstead Heath, Hanover Square, Grosvenor Gardens, Marble Arch, Mayfair and around the world. Visitor, Visitor II and Alien were exhibited by Sotheby’s in 2010, 2011 and 2013 at their Beyond Limits exhibitions at Chatsworth House and his sculptures and two-dimensional works have been exhibited with the National Trust. In 2016–2017 Breuer-Weil exhibited at the Jewish Museum, London alongside Edmund de Waal and Hans Coper. In 2017 Christie’s held a solo show of monumental Breuer-Weil sculpture that was held at various locations across London; Cavendish Square, St. Pancras, Portman Square and the Economist Plaza. In 2018, Flight, was installed in Marble Arch (and later on at St Pancras New Church, opposite Euston Station). Breuer-Weil’s Visitor II was exhibited in 2019 as part of The Child Within Me, Abdülmecid Efendi Pavilion, Istanbul, to coincide with the Istanbul Biennial. Alien II was exhibited in New Bond Street, London in 2021 and in 2022 Visitor V and Visitor I were installed in Berkeley Square, London.

Breuer-Weil is also famed for his monumental solo shows of large-scale painted canvases, “The Projects”. ‘The Project’ was held at the Roundhouse, Camden in 2001; ‘Project 2’ at the Bargehouse, OXO Tower in 2003; ‘Project 3’ was held in conjunction with the Ben Uri Gallery and Museum in 2007 and in 2013 ‘Project 4’ was exhibited in The Vaults, Waterloo.

A film about the artist, The King of Nerac, directed by Annie Sulzberger, was premiered in 2015 at the Institute of Contemporary Arts (ICA), London and in New York at the Lincoln Center. Variety describes the film as delivering “a remarkably detailed study of one man’s artistic process … his huge statues and canvases invites bigscreen play”. Skira published the monograph David Breuer-Weil: Radical Visionary in 2011 and in 2020 Gli Ori (Italy) published David Breuer-Weil Golden Drawings. Breuer-Weil lives and works in London.

== The Projects ==
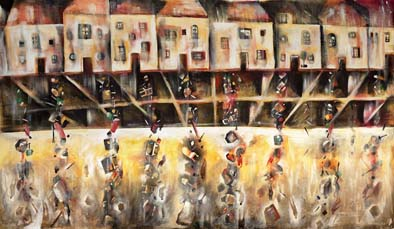
Suburb 2 (Secret), 2008, oil on canvas, 200 x 344cm part of Project 4

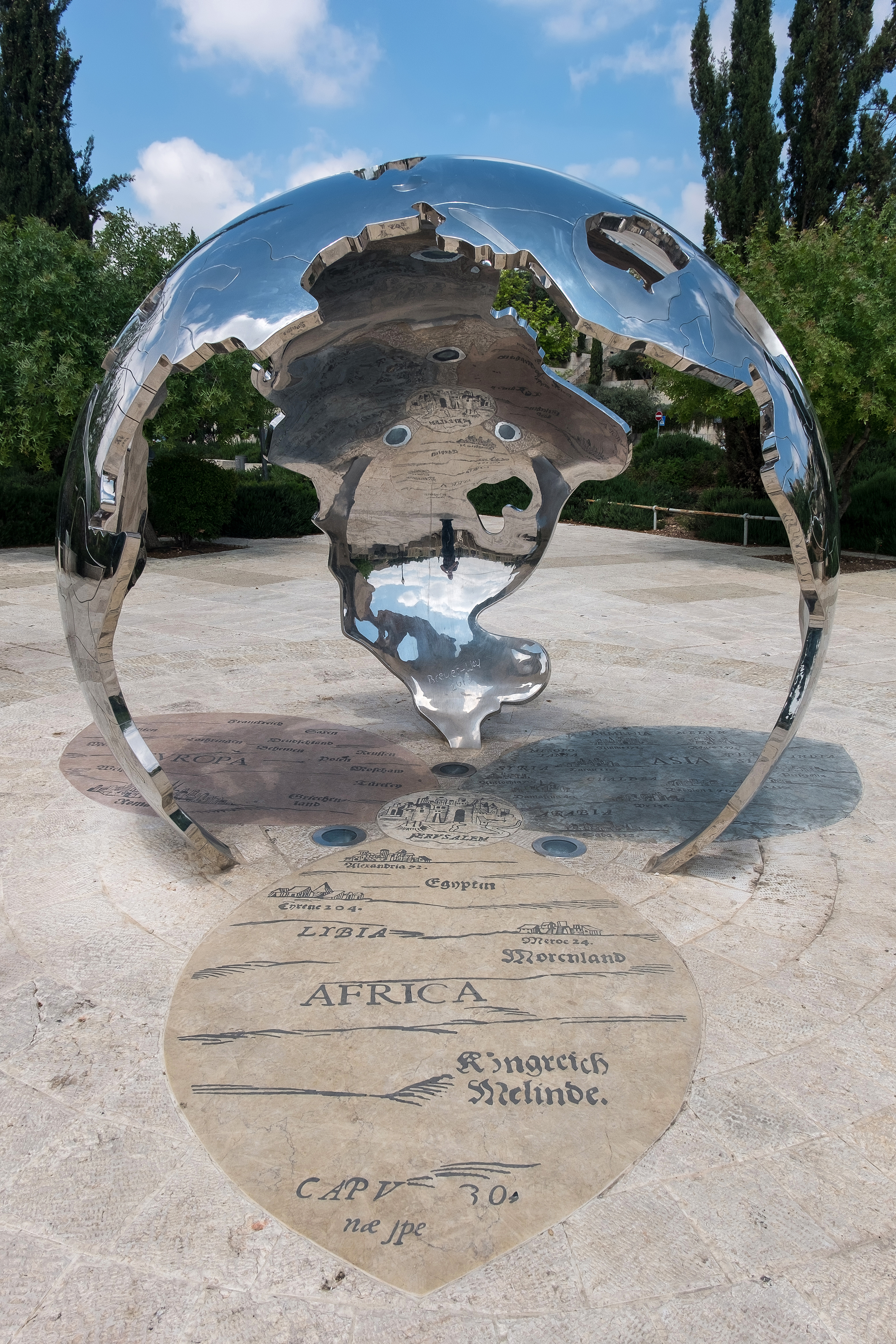
"Jerusalem as the Center of the World" (after the Bünting Clover Leaf Map), Teddy Kollek Park, Jerusalem

Breuer-Weil has labelled his collections of work as 'Project 1', 'Project 2', etc. 'Project 1' was completed during 1997–2001 and exhibited in the crypt of the Roundhouse in Camden Town, London. 'Project 2' (2003) was exhibited at the Bargehouse on the South Bank of the River Thames. 'Project 3' (2007) was exhibited in a disused multi-storey car park in Covent Garden. 'Project 4' (2007–2011), included themes of homeland, territory and belonging, and its motifs included fire, water, boxes, scrolls, books, feet, bricks, bubbles and Buddha-like seated figures.

== Visitor ==
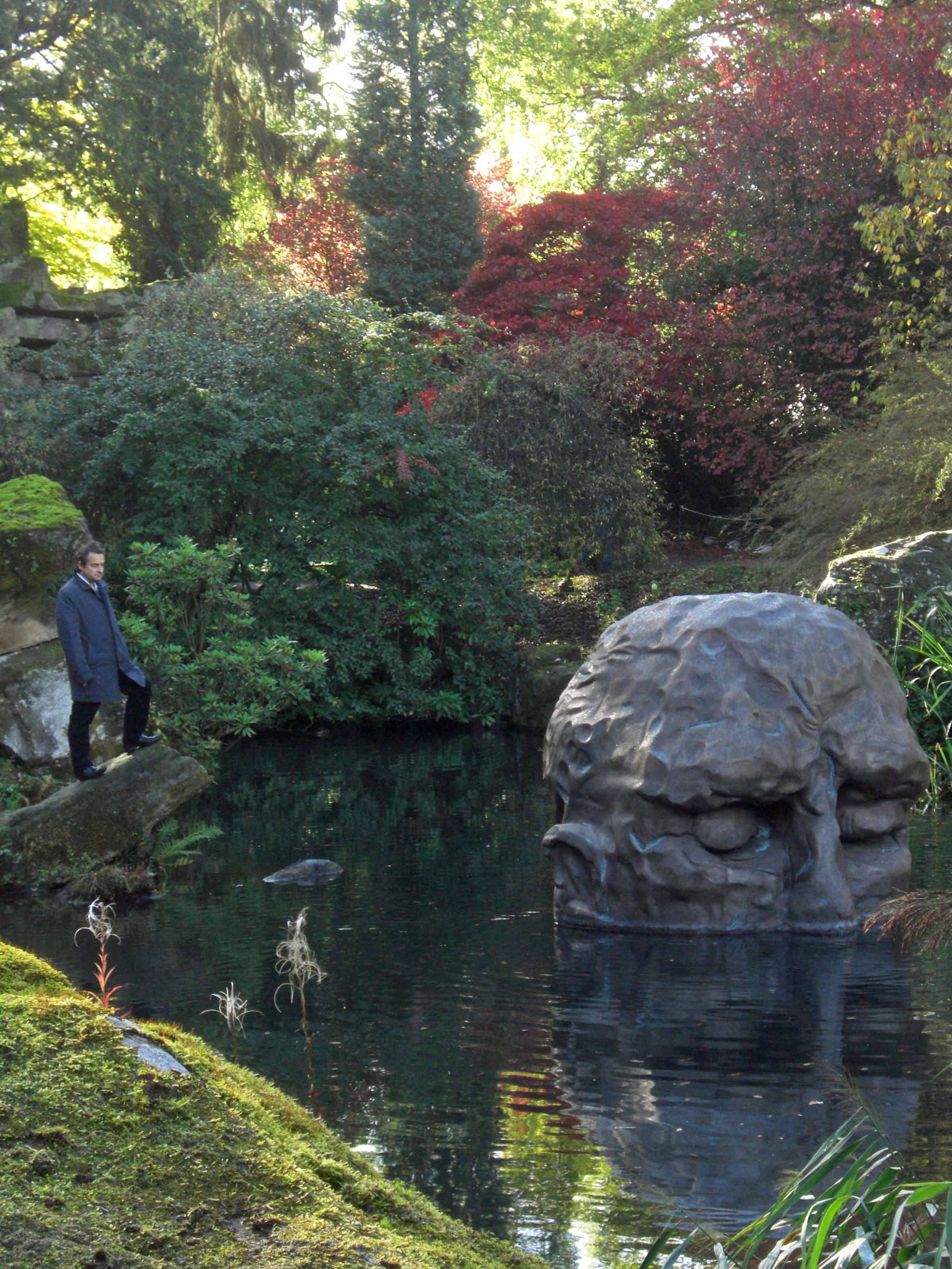
David Breuer-Weil standing beside his sculpture Visitor, exhibited at Sotheby's Beyond Limits at Chatsworth House, 2010

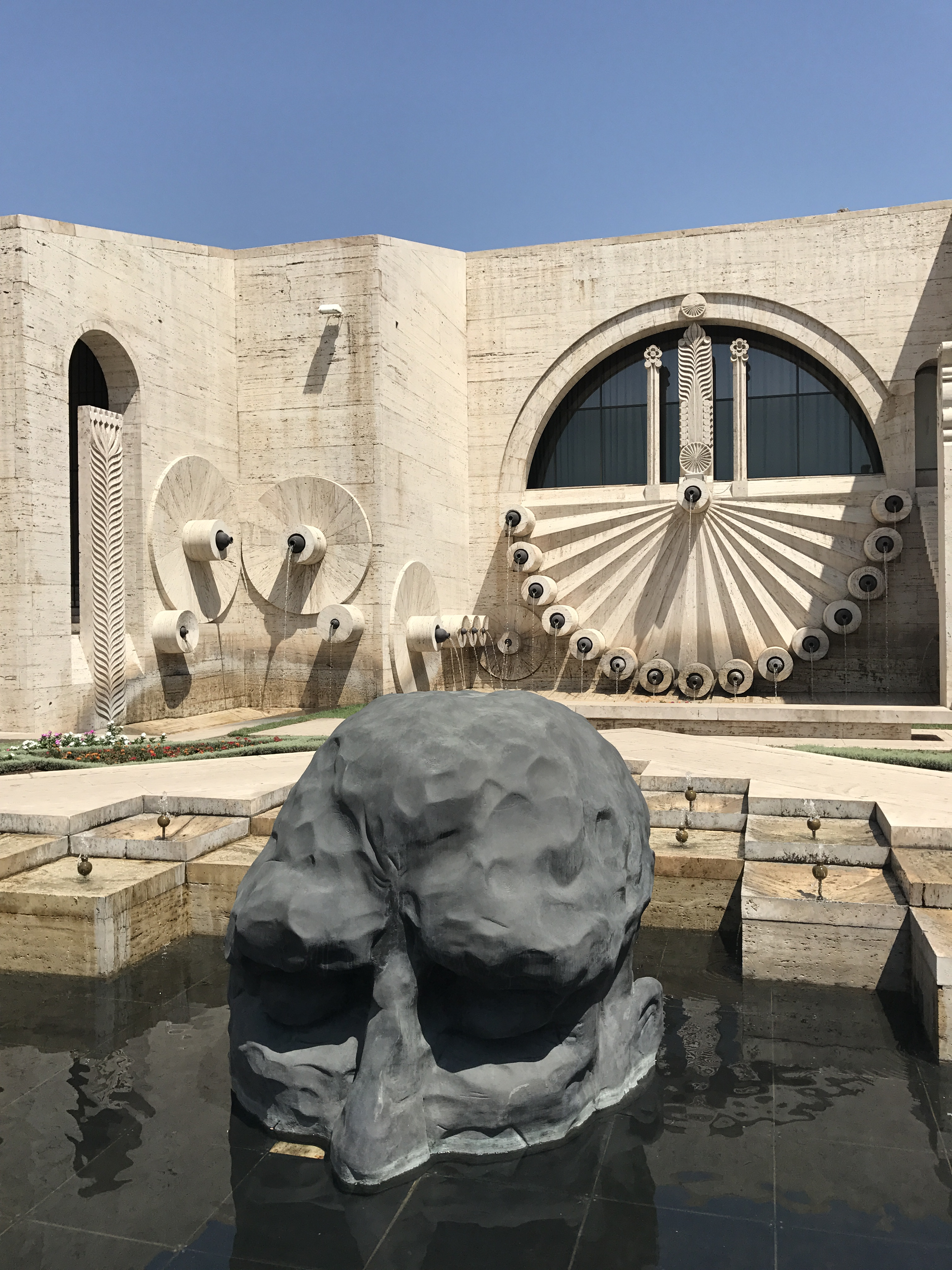
Visitor at the Yerevan Cascade

In 2010 Breuer-Weil exhibited Visitor at Sotheby's 'Beyond Limits' selling exhibition at Chatsworth House, Derbyshire. Visitor is a self-portrait sculpture of the top half of Breuer-Weil's head. The artist's fingerprints are greatly enlarged on the surface of the sculpture.

Breuer-Weil exhibited Visitor II at the 2011 'Beyond Limits' show, also at Chatsworth House. In Visitor II, Breuer-Weil presents a giant human form that has landed on the earth from above, an alien or fallen angel.

Breuer-Weil claimed, "With Visitor II I wanted to create a piece with the timeless simplicity of the Avebury Stones or Stonehenge, but infused with humanity and dynamism, and with a sense of the mystical and primeval... At the same time I have this idea of the absurdity of the human condition, a Monty Python-like surreal sense of humor that is part of the way I view reality."

In an interview with James Hyman, Breuer-Weil commented, "I find that sculpting in clay is in some ways more like painting than painting itself… I am definitely aware of the rich history and symbolism of making figures out of the earth, out of clay, because according to most ancient sources, notably the Bible, the first man was literally made out of earth and in fact the very word Adam means earth: there is the almost alchemical idea that when you use paint or clay you are creating a life force.".

== Monograph ==
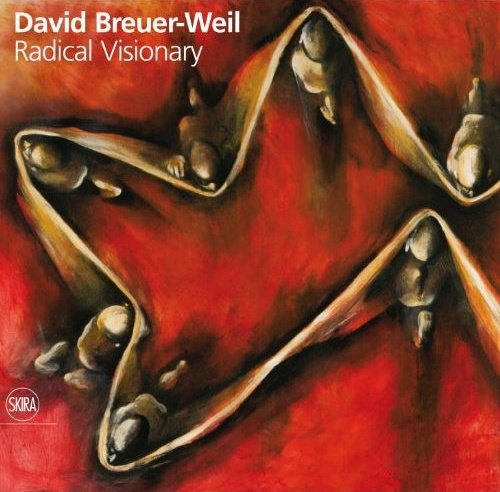
Cover of David Breuer-Weil: Radical Visionary, Skira, 2011

David Breuer-Weil: Radical Visionary was published by Skira, Milan, in August 2011. It covers the history of Breuer-Weil's career. It is currently (2013) the only monograph on Breuer-Weil's work. It includes images of over 200 works, essays by art historians Monica Bohm-Duchen, James Hyman, Ben Hanly, Richard Aronowitz, Susie Stanton Staikos, Simon Blomfield and John Russell Taylor.

== Exhibitions ==
=== Solo shows ===
- 2022 'Visitor V' and 'Visitor I', with E & R Cyzer for Mayfair Art Weekend and the Mayfair Sculpture Trail, Berkeley Square, London, UK
- 2021 'Flight', Monumental sculpture, St Pancras New Church, London, UK
- 2021 'Alien II', with E & R Cyzer for Mayfair Art Weekend and the Mayfair Sculpture Trail, New Bond Street, London
- 2021 'The Coviad' and 'Selected Golden Drawings' at the Ben Uri Museum and Gallery, London, UK
- 2019 'Emergence II', Monumental sculpture, Permanent Installation, London Docklands, London, UK
- 2019 'Laocoön (Philosopher)', Laocoon Gallery, London, UK
- 2019 David Breuer-Weil at Christie’s: 'Flight', Monumental sculpture, Marble Arch, London, UK
- 2019 'Stoic', Monumental sculpture, London, UK
- 2018 Airborne an exhibition of new works, E & R Cyzer Gallery, London, UK
- 2017 - 2019 'Alien' and 'Brothers', Monumental sculptures, St Pancras New Church, London, UK
- 2017–present 'Brothers' and 'Brothers II', Portman Square, London, UK
- 2017 'Visitor', Monumental sculpture, Cavendish Square, London, UK
- 2016 Animal Farm, Beastly Muses and Metaphors, Sotheby’s S|2, London, UK
- 2016-2017 Out of Chaos, Laing Art Gallery, Newcastle, UK
- 2016-2017 Shaping Ceramics: From Lucie Rie to Edmund de Waal, Jewish Museum, London, UK
- 2016 'Soul', Monumental sculpture, Permanent Installation, Children’s Wing of Shaare Zedek Hospital, Jerusalem, Israel
- 2016 'Brothers' Monumental sculpture, Marble Arch, London, UK
- 2015-2016 'Alien', Monumental sculpture, Mottisfont (National Trust House), Hampshire, UK,
- 2013-2017 'Emergence' Monumental sculpture, Portman Square, London, UK
- 2013-2017 'Alien', Monumental sculpture, Grosvenor Gardens, London, UK
- 2015 Centenary Exhibition: Out of Chaos – Ben Uri: 100 Years in London, Somerset House, London, UK
- 2015 Screening of Breuer-Weil film, The King of Nerac (directed by Annie Sulzberger) and attendant discussion, ICA (Institute of Contemporary Arts), London, UK
- 2015 Screening of Breuer-Weil film, The King of Nerac (directed by Annie Sulzberger) and attendant discussion, The Film Society of the Lincoln Centre in association with the New York Jewish Film Festival, Walter Reade Theatre, New York City, USA
- 2014 'Alien', Monumental sculpture, Museo Berardo Collection, Lisbon, Portugal
- 2013 'Jerusalem, Centre of the World', Monumental sculpture, Permanent Installation, Teddy Kollek Park, Jerusalem, Israel
- 2013 'Alien', Monumental Sculpture, Beyond Limits, Sotheby’s at Chatsworth, Chatsworth House, Derbyshire, UK
- 2012 'Emergence', Monumental sculpture, Hanover Square, London, UK
- 2012 'Visitor I', Monumental sculpture, 2012, Golders Hill Park Lily Pond, Hampstead Heath, London, UK
- 2011 'Visitor II', Monumental Sculpture, Beyond Limits, Sotheby’s at Chatsworth, Chatsworth House, Derbyshire, UK
- 2011 'Visitor I', Monumental sculpture, Permanent Collection, Cafesjian Museum of Art, Armenia
- 2010 'Visitor I', Monumental Sculpture, Beyond Limits, Sotheby’s at Chatsworth, Chatsworth House, Derbyshire, UK
- 2009 'Anorexic Babes' – Hayek Contemporary Art Centre, Jaffa, Israel
- 2008 The Vogue Landscapes, Alon Zakaim Fine Art, London, UK
- 2007 'Project 3', Ben Uri Museum, Covent Garden, London, UK
- 2007 'Codex' – Biblion, London, UK
- 2006 Breuer-Weil: Drawings, Lyon & Turnbull, London, UK
- 2004 Parallel Worlds, Boundary Gallery, London, UK
- 2003 'Project 2', The Bargehouse, OXO Tower Wharf, London, UK
- 2003 Extremes, Boundary Gallery, London, UK
- 2001 'Project 1', The Roundhouse, Camden Town, London, UK
- 2000 Adult Toys, Soho House, London, UK
- 1999 Fields of Dream: Drawings and Paintings, Boundary Gallery, London, UK
- 1999 Painted Reliefs, Engel Gallery, Tel Aviv, Israel
- 1998 Abstract Landscapes, Coningsby Gallery, London, UK
- 1997 Boundary Gallery, London, UK
- 1994 Boundary Gallery, London, UK
- 1993 Engel Gallery, Tel Aviv, Israel
- 1991 Large Figurations, Sotheby's, London, UK
- 1986 Clare College, Cambridge, UK
- 1985 Central Library, Cambridge, UK

=== Mixed Shows ===
- 2019 'Visitor II', Monumental sculpture, The Child Within Me, Abdülmecid Efendi Pavilion, to coincide with the Istanbul Biennial, Istanbul, Turkey
- 2011 Beyond the Human Clay, James Hyman Fine Art, London, UK (also featured Frank Auerbach, Peter Doig, Angus Fairhurst, Peter de Francia, R.B. Kitaj, Henry Moore, Chris Ofili, and others.)
- 2011 The Human Figure in 20th Century British Sculpture, Boundary Gallery, London, UK (also featured Jacob Epstein, Ghisha Koenig, Henry Moore, and others.)
- 2010 Beyond Limits: Sotheby's at Chatsworth, Chatsworth House, Derbyshire, UK (also featured Barry Flanagan, Subodh Gupta, Damian Hirst, Yue Minjun, Mark Quinn, and others.)
- 2010 Apocalypse, Osborne Samuel Gallery, London, UK (also featured Frank Auerbach, David Bomberg, Marc Chagall, Jacob Epstein, R.B. Kitaj, and Leon Kossoff.)
- 2007 Alon Zakaim Fine Art, London, UK
- 2006 Recent Acquisitions, 2001–2006, Ben Uri Gallery, The London Jewish Museum of Art, UK
- 2005 Contemporary Masters, Engel Gallery, Tel Aviv, Israel
- 2005 Closing the Door? Immigrants to Britain 1905–2005, The London Jewish Museum of Art, UK (also featured Chris Ofili, Qu Lei Lei, Amal Ghosh, and others)
- 2003 Director's Choice: Highlights from the Ben Uri Permanent Collection, The London Jewish Museum of Art, UK
- 2001 The Ben Uri Story: From Art Society to Museum, Phillips Auctioneers in association Ben Uri Gallery, London, UK (also featured Frank Auerbach, David Bomberg, Antony Caro, Lucien Freud, Mark Gertler, Jacob Kramer, Leon Kossoff, and others.)
- 2001 Mary R, Bourne Fine Art, Edinburgh, UK
- 2000 The Land, Engel Gallery, Tel Aviv, Israel (also featured Avigdor Arikha and Mordechai Ardon.)
- 1999 E1 Gallery, London, UK
- 1997 Engel Gallery, Tel Aviv, Israel
- 1996 Sotheby's Artists, New York City
- 1995 Galerie Mantoux, Paris, France
- 1995 The Colour Blue, Boundary Gallery, London, UK
- 1994 Mizel Museum, Colorado, USA
- 1994 Sotheby's Artists, London, UK
- 1994 Engel Gallery, Tel Aviv, Israel
- 1985–88, 90, 94 Ben Uri Art Gallery, London, UK

== Bibliography ==
- James Hyman, Monica Bohm-Duchen, Chris Craig, David Breuer-Weil: Radical Visionary, Skira, Italy, 2011
- James Hyman, Beyond the Human Clay, accompanying catalogue and essay to exhibition at James Hyman Fine Art, May 2011
- Susie Stanton Staikos, A Colossus on Canvas, Art of the Times, October 2007
- Monica Bohm-Duchen, Cave Paintings for the modern Soul,Jewish Renaissance, July 2007
- Julia Weiner, Arts New Venue – A Car Park, The Jewish Chronicle, 8 June 2007
- Michael C. Corballis, Think so?, Times Literary Supplement, 1 June 2007
- This Week...., Daily Express Magazine, 2 June 2007
- Artist finds space in huge NCP Car Park, Camden New Journal, 31 May 2007
- A Portrait of Blair in his Cups, Evening Standard, 21 January 2005
- Artistís Political Protest in Polystyrene, Ham & High, 21 January 2005
- Gerald Isaaman, His Cup Runneth Over, Camden New Journal, 10 March 2005
- Hickey Column, Daily Express, 4 March 2005
- Colin Gleadell, Contemporary Market, The Daily Telegraph, 28 February 2005
- Julia Weiner, Prize and Shine, Jewish Chronicle, 23 July 2004
- Lucy Siegle, My Chair, David Breuer-Weil, artist, The Observer Magazine (OM), 26 January 2003
- Helen Smithson, Braining Up Art, Ham & High, 24 January 2003
- Hephzibah Anderson, David Breuer-Weil, Project 2, Metro Life, The Evening Standard Magazine, 24–30 January 2003
- Private Galleries, Art, David Breuer-Weil, Metro Life, The Evening Standard Magazine, 24–30 January 2003
- John Russell Taylor, Social Conscience is Breaking Out All Over, The Times, 29 January 2003
- Hephzibah Anderson, David Breuer-Weil, Project 2, Metro Life, The Evening Standard Magazine, 31 January-6 February 2003
- A Taste of Europe, The Jerusalem Report, 12 August 2002
- Simon Rocker, Artistic Eurostars get Funding, Jewish Chronicle, 25 January 2002
- Monica Bohm-Duchen, The Jewish Quarterly, Spring 2001
- Julia Weiner, Fresh Paint, Jewish Chronicle, 9 February 2001
- Helen Smithson, Towering Tunnel Visions that Trap your Mind, Ham & High, 2 February 2001
- Colin Gleadell, Art Sales, The Daily Telegraph, 22 January 2001
- John Russell Taylor, Colossal Talent, The Times, 24 January 2001
- ArtReview, David Breuer-Weil, Artist's Eye, February 2000
- Helen Smithson, Neurotic Images at Hand, Ham & High, 10 September 1999
- John Russell Taylor, Breuer-Weil, The Times, 22 September 1999
- Julia Weiner, Oy 2K, The JC, 17 September 1999
- Breuer-Weil, The Week Magazine, 11 September 1999
- Simon Spungin, Breuer-Weil Takes a Sideways Look, International Herald Tribune, 16 July 1999
- Julia Weiner, The Artistís Lot, Jewish Chronicle, 25 April 1997
- Linda Talbot, Art: Breuer-Weil, Revealing the Myths Behind the Man, Ham & High, 8 September 1995
- Judith Glass, Rock Star, Jewish Chronicle, 18 November 1994
- Patricia Miller, Portrait of the artist as a member of staff, Evening Standard, 23 July 1991
