= David Zink Yi =

- Known for: video, photography, sculpture

David Zink Yi is a contemporary artist working primarily in video, photography, and sculpture.

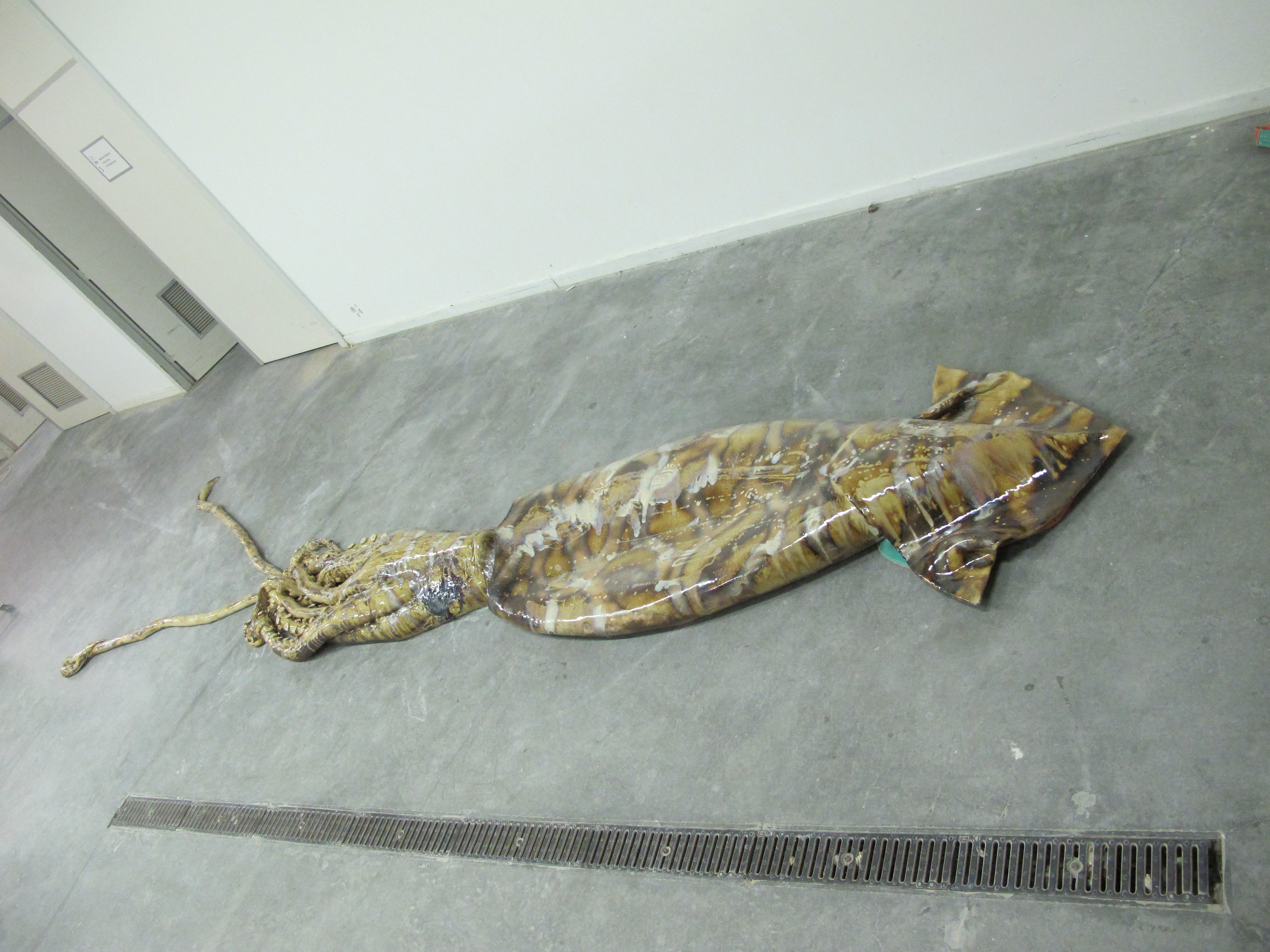
David Zink (2010)

He has said: "body is the space and the medium in which the process of questioning of identity takes place".
