= Jean-François Boclé =

French artist (1971–2026)

- Born: 1971; Fort-de-France, Martinique, France
- Died: 11 March 2026 (aged 54)
- Education: École nationale supérieure des Beaux-Arts of Paris
- Notable work: Tout doit disparaître! / Everything Must Go! Outre‑Mémoire The Tears of Bananaman
- Website: www.jeanfrancoisbocle.com

Jean-François Boclé (1971 – 11 March 2026) was a French artist. His practice mixed poetic writing with installation, painting, sculpture, video, photography, intervention in the public space, and performance.

== Background ==
Jean-François Boclé was born in 1971 in Fort-de-France, Martinique, Caribbean, living his childhood years in Saint-Esprit. He moved to Paris at fifteen, where he lived and worked at the time of his death. After his studies in Modern Literature at Sorbonne university, he was trained first at the École nationale supérieure d'art de Bourges and then at the École nationale supérieure des beaux-arts of Paris.

Boclé died on 11 March 2026, at the age of 54.

== Work ==
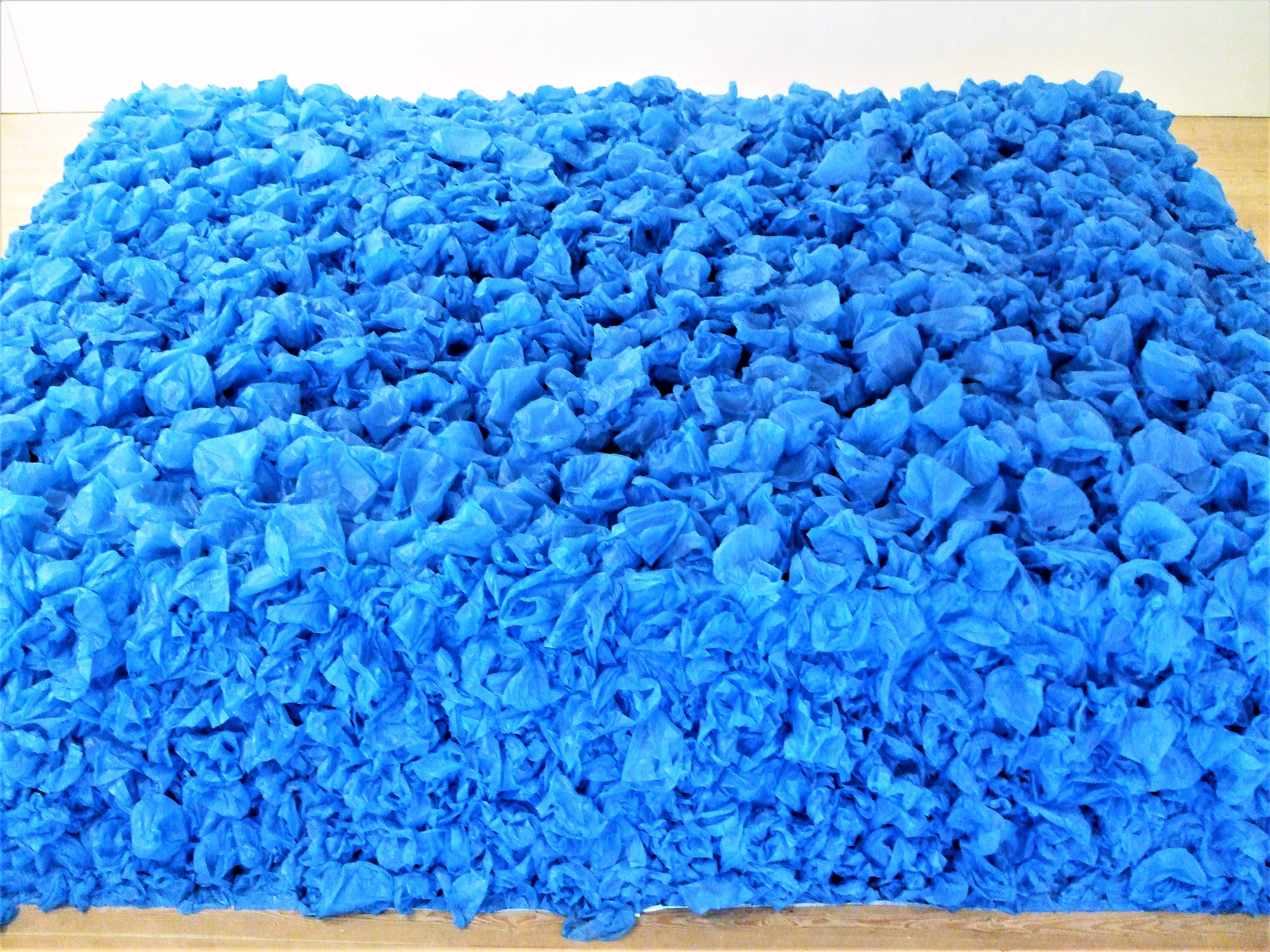
Everything Must Go! Installation at The Saatchi Gallery (London, 2019)

Jean-François Boclé participated in several biennials such as the 1st Biennial of Thessaloniki (2007, State Museum of Contemporary Art, Greece), showing "Tout doit disparaître! (Everything must go!)". This is a work Bocle repeated throughout his career, beginning with a show at Espace Oscar Niemeyer, in Paris, in 2001. In an installation at the Saatchi Gallery in 2015, it was described as: "a sea of blue plastic bags forms an abyss, a quasi-memorial to lives lost at sea during the transatlantic slave trade." He took part in a group work entitled “Integration and resistance in the global era. A critical territory” at the 10th Havana Biennial (2011, Cuba). In September 2011, he participated in the 8th Biennial of Mercosur in Porto Alegre (Brazil).

In 2008, the Bildmuseet in Umeå, Sweden, devoted the entire Museum to Boclé for its largest solo exhibition to date, to represent the characteristics of his art, "the wide range of media employed, the presence of precise and challenging topics, the relationship with a colonial past and a post-colonial present ". In 2010, his work was the subject of a solo exhibition at the 28th Art Brussels Contemporary Art Fair.

In 2011, Boclé was Artist in Residence at the Instituto Buena Bista in Curaçao. He was also part of a touring show, Fetish Modernity, which visited the Royal Museum for Central Africa (Tervuren, Belgium), the Museo de América in Madrid, the Naprstek Museum in Praha, the Museum of Ethnology in Vienna, the National Museum of Ethnology in Leiden (Netherlands), and the Nationaal Museum van Wereldculturen in Stockholm over four years. The exhibition was described in the Museo de América catalogue as: "created by six European Museums, [it] invites visitors to explore the notion of modernity. (...) This idea is expressed via several themes: criticism of the legacy of ethnography museums through contemporary art; (...)."

Also in 2011, he participated in the International Festival of contemporary sculpture Escaut. Rives, dérives (30 cities in Northern France), and the 8th Mercosur Biennial in Porto Alegre (Brazil).

=== Exhibitions ===
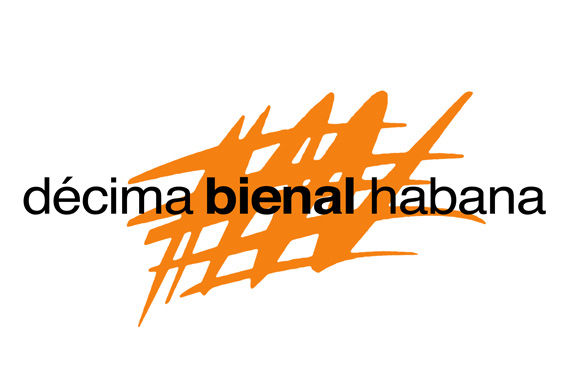
10th Havana Biennial

2007 1st Thessaloniki Biennial, Greece

2009 Group Show Kreyol Factory, Paris

2009 10th Havana Bienal, Cuba

2010 Festival of Contemporary Sculpture Escaut, Rives et dérives, France

2010 31st Biennial of Pontevedra, Spain

2010 Group show Global Caribbean, Miami

=== Publications ===
==== Articles ====
- Boclé Jean‑François “Outre-Mémoire Un Mémorial Sonore Et Visuel.” Africultures 2014 pp.162–162.
- Boclé Jean‑François and Anna Seiderer. “La Peau Morte De L’Écriture. Un Entretien Avec Jean-François Boclé.” Esclavages & Post-Esclavages (20220519) 2022.
