= Jan Sawka =

Polish-born American artist and architect

Jan Sawka (December 10, 1946 – August 9, 2012) was a Polish-born American artist and architect.

== Early life ==
In 1946, Sawka was born to an architect father and linguist mother, Jan and Maria Sawka, in the Silesian city of Zabrze. His father was imprisoned by the government of Communist Poland shortly after his birth. His mother was not allowed to pursue her career, but worked privately as a tutor.

Sawka completed two master's degrees: in painting and print-making from the Wrocław Fine Arts Academy and in Architectural Engineering from the Institute of Technology in Wroclaw. By his late 20s, Sawka was a star of the famed Polish Poster School (located in Warsaw) and a leading artist of the counter-culture. During the late 1960s and early 1970s, he became known in Poland for the posters and stage sets that he designed for avant-garde theater groups. He largely was able to avoid trouble with censors until his work begin to be noticed by foreign art critics, who commented on the hidden anti-authoritarian elements in his art. His oppositionist activities led to his exile from Poland in 1976. When he immigrated to New York in 1977, he had no money and he was unheard of in the United States.

Sawka's art was widely praised by the dissidents against Communist Poland. In 1981, when martial law was imposed in Poland, the AFL-CIO sponsored a bipartisan fundraiser that sold Sawka's Solidarity poster in the millions to provide immediate support to the besieged Solidarity movement.

== New York City ==
After 1977, he resided in New York, becoming part of the American cultural mainstream. Early in his time in the United States, Sawka created editorial drawings for the New York Times, while developing a multi-faceted career that encompassed printmaking, painting, sculpture, and theater design. Numerous galleries have exhibited his paintings and prints, and he designed for such theaters as the Harold Clurman, Jean Cocteau Repertory and Samuel Beckett Theater.

His awards have included the 1975 Oscar de la Peinture in Cagnes-sur-Mer, France for painting and the Gold Medal at the 1978 Warsaw Poster Biennial.

In 1985, Sawka opened a series of one-man art exhibitions in New York City. The size and scope were unusual for an artist, and the success he had achieved in the eight years since his arrival from Poland was also unusual.

== Multimedia projects ==
In 1989, Sawka designed a 10-story tall set for The Grateful Dead's 25th Anniversary tour. He continued to work with the band for the remainder of his life, including "The Voyage", a collaboration with drummer Mickey Hart.

In 1993, he created his first full multi-media spectacle, "The Eyes" in Japan. This was the beginning of his collaboration with Japanese studios and corporations, which includes the creation of high-tech interactive sculptures and monumental installations, as well as designs for full-scale monumental architecture. Sawka designed "The Tower of Light Cultural Complex" for Abu Dhabi, U.A.E., presented to the Royal Family in 1996. A pilot version of "The Voyage", a full-length multimedia spectacle, won the Gold Medal in Multi-Media at the 2003 Florence Contemporary Art Biennial. He is represented ACA Galleries in New York's Chelsea arts district.

== Death ==
On August 9, 2012, Sawka died from a heart attack at his home in High Falls, New York, at the age of 65. At the time of his death, his works were featured in over 60 museums worldwide, and he had held more than 70 solo exhibitions at international museums and galleries. He was in the midst of completing the feature-length, final version of "Voyage" when he died.

== Personal life ==
Sawka was married to his wife Hanka Sawka, with whom he had a daughter and two grandchildren. Those who worked with him described him as full of energy and imagination, and that his personality inspired others to produce art.

== Artistic style ==
As an artist, Sawka insisted on controlling his artistic vision and refused to work with art dealers who wanted him to work in a particular style. His work was unusually diverse and didn't neatly fit within any genres or trends. Sawka himself had no idea what his style should be called.

His work has been described as an alternative to Neo-Expressionists such as Julian Schnabel.

=== Selected points from career ===
1975 Oscar de la Peinture award and the special prize of the President of France, 7th International Painting Festival, Cagnes-sur-Mer, France.

1986 NY Times Book of the Year for A Book of Fiction, Clarkson and Potter, New York

1989 First large-scale concert set (10 stories in height, for the Grateful Dead 25th Anniversary Tour) 1989.

1994 "The Eyes" multi-media spectacle fully conceived and executed by Jan Sawka is produced by famed theatre director Tadashi Suzuki at Mito Art Tower Center, Japan.

1994 Japanese Cultural Agency Award, Tokyo.

1996 International OSAKA Award nominee in the fields of architecture and design.

1996 Presentation to the Royal Family of Abu Dhabi, U.A.E. of the Tower of Light Cultural Complex design.

1999 Design and rendering of large-scale projections for Houston SKYPOWER 40th Anniversary of NASA celebration spectacle.

2003 Premio di Lorenzo Il Magnifico Gold Medal in Multimedia, 4th International Biennial of Contemporary Art, Florence, Italy. This award was given for the pilot of "The Voyage" multi-media spectacle. "The Voyage" is now in pre-production as a joint production of Toho Studios, Japan and Helge Joost Productions, Germany for worldwide distribution.

2004 Exhibition entitled "Into the Open: From Studio Works to Monumental Projects, and Beyond…" at landmark New York art gallery ACA Galleries, New York (on the NY Times' list of top ten most important galleries of New York City) 2004 – Development of the Tower of Light Cultural Complex, including 9 museums and 4 major cultural institutions for the city of Abu Dhabi, United Arab Emirates.

=== Major awards ===
- 1973 – Award for the most outstanding young poster designer, 5th Biennial of Polish Poster Design, Katowice (Poland)
- 1973 – Second place, 6th National Graphic Art Exhibition, Warsaw (Poland)
- 1974 – LOT Polish Airlines Award, 5th International Poster Biennial, Warsaw (Poland)
- 1974 – Golden Pin award, given by the editorial staff of Szpilki satirical magazine, Warsaw (Poland)
- 1975 – Oscar de la Peinture award and the special prize of the President of France, 7th International Painting Festival, Cagnes-sur-Mer (France)
- 1978 – 1st Prize, 7th International Poster Biennale, Warsaw (Poland)
- 1979 – Prize of Honor, 3rd Biennial of Poster Design, Lahti (Finland)
- 1990 – Silver Medal, XIV Biennale of Graphic Design, Brno (Czechoslovakia)
- 1991 – Artist Laureate, 7th Colorado International Invitational Poster Exhibition, Ft. Collins, Colorado (USA)
- 1994 – Japanese Cultural Agency Award, Tokyo (Japan)
- 1995 – Award of Merit, 9th Colorado International Invitational Poster Exhibition, Fort Collins, Colorado (USA)
- 2003 – Gold Medal in Multimedia, 4th International Biennial of Contemporary Art, Florence, (Italy)
- 2011 – AIA (American Institute of Architects) New Hampshire, Excellence in Architecture Design Award for Pease Monument and Complex - Jerusalem (Award received together with Bartlomiej Sapeta), New Hampshire, USA.
