= Mark Wiener =

American painter

Mark Wiener (New York City, August 24, 1951 – September 29, 2012) was a New York City based abstract painter, editor and teacher.

Wiener studied painting and photography under Bauhaus influences at the Philadelphia College of Art (now a part of the University of the Arts). Influenced by Alexi Brodivitch, Frank Zachry, and Alexander Lieberman, he early began working simultaneously in several visual media. Wiener worked for some years, in the United States and Europe, as a professional photographer, illustrator and web designer before turning to full-time painting. His commercial work from that period appeared in magazines including The Wall Street Journal, Esquire, New York Magazine, Paris Match, as well as in such books as Family of Children and The Art of Mickey Mouse.

In 2006 he exhibited his gestural paintings at the Montblanc Manhattan flagship store, and participated in the Felissimo Design House "Tribute 21" program, work reproduced on ceramic plate and sold for the benefit of UNESCO. He received commissions from the World Federation of United Nations Associations to create first day covers and limited edition lithographs to accompany issues of UN Postage Stamps, and was awarded the Croix de Chevalier de’orde Belgo Hispanique under the patronage of Queen Fabiola of Belgium. He exhibited in Los Angeles, London, Paris, Milan and Tokyo, and regularly in New York City. His work appears in numerous private and corporate collections worldwide and in the permanent collection of the Housatonic Museum of Art.

Wiener published and was editor-in-chief of the online magazine Resolve40.com, which seeks to integrate artists in a New York art community, by frequent reviews of current exhibitions and activities at galleries and major museums, and by encouraging artists to participate in writing. This was one of the activities for which, Peter Frank characterizes Wiener – using Jane Jacobs's term – as a "public character": one of those who, in the thick of a social fabric – here the New York City art scene – "find, or appoint, themselves its custodians."

After first devoting himself to photography, Wiener, based upon personal observations of the photographer Irving Penn’s process, began an approach to painting that he called "the white surface". This combines the acting out of a "visual story" during the creation of the work, with Bauhaus ideas of underlying structure. In Wiener's later works it appears as his organic gesture of throwing, dripping and pouring paint, orchestrated between drawing and painting layers of geometric objects, in increasingly large scales, with a variety of objects that he considered "brushes". However, on a more intimate scale, he drew incessantly, whether in his many sketchbooks or on iPad, across all media—the digital no less than traditional charcoal, graphite and ink—responding to all experiences of life, but notably the process histories revealed in the textures of pavements and walls of his beloved City, demonstrating the seemingly inexhaustible form resources of gestural marks.

Wiener, in studio, was featured on the cover image for the Wall Street Journal article on Chelsea galleries in August, 2004. Opening of a memorial exhibition, "Street Markings" (October 3–25), curated from Mark Wiener's unfinished painting series and other related works, was delayed by storm-related electricity loss at Dorian Grey Gallery, 437 East 9th Street (near Avenue A), but, opened nevertheless on Wednesday, November 7, 2012.
