= Mira Schendel =

Brazilian painter (1919-1988)

- Born: Myrrha Dagmar Dub; June 7, 1919; Zurich, Switzerland
- Died: July 24, 1988 (aged 69); São Paulo, Brazil
- Occupations: Artist; Painter; Sculptor
- Spouse(s): Josep Hargesheimer (1941–1953); Knut Schendel (1960–1988)

Mira Schendel (June 7, 1919 – July 24, 1988) was a 20th-century Brazilian contemporary artist. She was known for her drawings on rice paper and was also active as a painter, poet, and sculptor. Her work drew upon the art of language and poetry, and what appears to have driven her was the ability to reinvent it.

== Early life ==
Mira Schendel was born Myrrha Dagmar Dub in 1919 in Zurich, Switzerland. Her father, Karl Leo Dub, was a fabric merchant, and her mother, Ada Saveria Büttner, was a milliner. Although she had Jewish heritage, Schendel was baptized at her mother's request at the Kirche St. Peter and Paul, a Catholic church in Zurich, on October 20, 1920 and was raised as a Roman Catholic. Schendel's parents divorced in September 1922, and her mother married Count Tommaso Gnoli in 1937. In the late 1930s, Schendel began to study philosophy at the Universita Cattolica del Sacro Cuore in Milan. During her time in Milan Schendel also attended an art class. Because of racial laws introduced in Fascist Italy in 1938, she was designated as Jewish, stripped of her Italian citizenship and forced to leave university, and so decided to flee Italy in 1939. After travelling through Switzerland and Austria, she joined a group of refugees heading to Sarajevo. After spending the war in Sarajevo, she returned to Italy, with her first husband Josep Hargesheimer, and worked for the International Refugee Organization in Rome. Having applied to various countries in the Americas, in August 1949 she emigrated and settled with Josep in Brazil.

Mira Schendel's arrival in Brazil ended a tortuous journey. Her significant background perhaps explains the theme of emancipation from the body/mind dialect and the metaphysical experience coinciding found throughout her work.

== Career ==
When she arrived in São Paulo in 1953, Brazilian modernism was dominated by a debate between figuration and abstraction. During the 1930s and 1940s figurative 'modernismo' had been dominant, but in the late 1940s and early 1950s abstract-geometric art began to be shown in Brazil and led to the founding of the Concrete art movement Ruptura in 1952. In São Paulo, an immigrant city that was industrial and undergoing rapid growth, Schendel found a circle of emigre intellectuals from different disciplines with whom she could discuss ideas about aesthetics and philosophy; this included the Czech-born philosopher Vilem Flusser, the physicist Mário Schenberg and the psychoanalyst Theon Spanudis among others. She became a prolific modernist painter and sculptor. She used paint with talc and brick dust, and made many drawings on rice paper. According to Laura Cumming her art has its sources in phenomenology, in the idea of being and nothingness, in mystical thinking and her deep reading of Wittgenstein. But the impact of these works does not depend upon the viewer sharing either that knowledge or those interests.

Schendel’s work features mixtures of calligraphy, phrases, letters, and encrypted traces of language. The graphic output in Schendel’s paintings explore the relations between language and art, and the inquiry into that relationship reveals itself in the totality of her work. Schendel’s paintings from the mid-1950s depict shallow surfaces, simplified figuration, and muted tones, and the textures and materials stand out more than the values of the color. These early works suggest a play of opposition between visual elements and the hand of the artist.

In the early 1960s, the corporeal component of Schendel’s paintings began to change as she moved toward a more imprecise and all-embracing involvement with space.

In the early 1960s, Schendel received a gift of rice paper from Mário Schenberg and in 1964 began to use this to make monotype drawings. Between 1964 and 1966, Schendel produced almost two thousand drawings in oil paintings on fine rice paper, as well as the Monotypes series. The central subject Schendel explored in these notebooks was time, the dimension of language.

In Monotypes, Schendel dealt with the desire to dismantle the teleology of language. Schendel’s technique for these works was to apply paint to a glass laminate, apply a light layer of talcum powder over it to prevent paper from picking it up on contact, then used her fingernails and other points instrumented to draw on paper she would lay on the glass. This technique makes the drawing seem to emerge from within the paper and transforms the text she draws to antitext. The lines of Schendel’s drawings are driven toward writing. The precise inscriptions are linked to letters and words and the gesture of her hand is linked to more general meanings. Her works explore the universality of language. However, later in her career lines lost association with the movement of her hand and gained the generality of concepts as she began to place them in ambiguous situations.

She worked rapidly and in little over a year she had made the majority of approximately 2,000 drawings. In these works she also first combined multiple languages, using words and phrases from her principle spoken languages - Italian, German and Portuguese but also adding words in French, English, Croat and Czech. One important group of monotypes was inspired by Karlheinz Stockhausen's Gesang der Jünglinge (1955–1956), an early piece of electronic music that employed vocals drawn from the biblical Book of Daniel. A number of these were included in the 1965 São Paulo Bienal.

These drawings included Droguinhas (Little Nothings), c. 1965–68, Trenzinho (Little Train), 1965, and the Objetos graficos (Graphic objects), 1967.

After using rice paper in Monotypes and discovering the quality of the material, Schendel began to use it as an autonomous medium itself in her works Droguinhas and Trenzinho. By 1966 Schendel put a hold on painting to create sculptures made from rice paper rolled up into strings that were woven into knots. This technique resulted in shapeless forms. Schendel’s Trenzinhos and Droguinhas refuse any objecthood as they are sculptures that are humorously without volume or interiority.

For the 1969 Bienal de São Paulo, Schendel created Ondas paradas de probabilidade—Antigo Testamento, Livro dos Reis, I, 19 (Still waves of probability—Old Testament, I Kings 19), an installation consisting of nylon thread and wall text on acrylic sheet which was Schendel's only work of an environmental nature.

Mira Schendel also plays against the grain of language. In works such as Droguinhas, Trenzinhos, and Still Waves of Probability, despite the overall repetition and accumulation, Schendel explores language as action, faltering to absolute resistance. According to Sonia Salzstein, in Schendel’s experience, the subjectivity emerges in the course of a process and therefore, can’t be reduced to a psychology.

Between 1963 and 1969 in Latin America there was a movement aimed at transforming nonobjective abstraction into penetrable forms. A key concept in this repertoire was an experience of density as a penetrable experience. However, penetrable works by Schendel, among others, displace density, transforming it and using it to transcend purely sensory perception and therefore suggesting new dimensions according to Perez-Oramas.

Penetrable works by Schendel at the end of the 1960s contributed heavily to the conversion of abstract form into a specific place that began demanding participation from the viewer.

Schendel’s Perfurados creates constellations, clusters, and spiderwebs of light, walls, or undersurfaces shining through their pinpricked surfaces. Although these works are small scale they evoke cosmic dimensions and ethereal distances, but at the same time call attention to the materials in which they are made.

Objeto gráfico (Graphic object) (1967-1968, 1967-1968, and 1972) at Glenstone in 2023

Between the late 1960s and the early 1990s, Schendel began making works out of acrylic and hung them from the ceiling, like in her works Discos and Objetos Graficos (Graphic Objects.) These works depict constellations of letters, numbers, and graphic symbols and give the impression of symbols floating in immediate space. In her work Graphic Objects, Schendel pressed graphic letters and symbols on rice paper between sheets of acrylic laminate and displayed them in space. Superimposition, transparency and space were all important to this work, narrating the interplay of chaos and meaning.

By the early 1970s, the essential character of Schendel’s work had emerged with an aesthetic that didn’t attempt any classification or justification which lead to the most original expressions of contemporary art.

In one of Schendel’s last series, Monochromatics (1986–87,) she coated wooden surfaces with gently modulated plaster and painted in white and black tempera. This produced soft shadows and optical lines that differentiated themselves from the other lines that were drawn in oilstick. Her assistant at the time, Fernando Bento, said that to illustrate where Schendel wanted the lines, she would point to white lines left by passing airplanes in the sky. The contrasting quality of the two lines in this work created doubt about the position of the surface, therefore forcing the viewer to focus on one line at a time.

== Personal life ==
On April 19, 1941, Schendel married Josep Hargesheimer, a Catholic Croatian whom she met in Sarajevo. Schendel received a Croatian passport in 1944. In 1949, she and Hargesheimer emigrated to Brazil together. They lived in Porto Alegre but in 1953 Schendel separated from Josep and moved alone to São Paulo, where she settled. In 1954, she met Knut Schendel, a German emigre and owner of an important bookshop, Canuto, which was a hub for São Paulo's intellectuals. In 1957, Schendel and Knut had a daughter, Ada Clara Schendel. Mira Schendel married Knut on March 17, 1960.

She died at the age of 69 in 1988 from lung cancer, in São Paulo.

== Artwork ==
Schendel was in communication with other artists in Brazil, but she was not heavily influenced by any of them. She had no ties to any specific school or movement, and she was constantly evolving her work and techniques throughout her life.

When Schendel arrived in Brazil she had an experimental and reflective attitude towards things. These traits reveal themselves in her work, as well as her previous experience in art and philosophy during her time in Milan. Schendel’s experimental nature produced heterogeneous works that are not easy to confine to a consistent style. She explored multiple directions in her work which allowed her to enjoy the freedom of fluid form of thought and play with the limits of form and work itself.

Schendel’s work drew upon the art of language and poetry, and what appears to have driven her was the ability to reinvent it.

Schendel neither attempted to order reality or to impose meaning on it in her art. Through her art she examined the possibilities of our presence in the world with the recognition of both our limitations and relating achievements.

Interpretations of Schendel’s work often mention an opposition between gentleness and force. This quality is believed to result from her singular approach to reality. Her material attained intensity through gentle interventions and her works' meaning depends on preserving this tension.

== Selected works and publications ==
Selected works

Untitled Located in NYC part of Private Collection 1956*

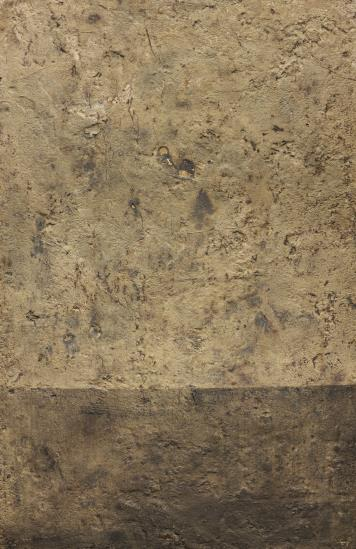

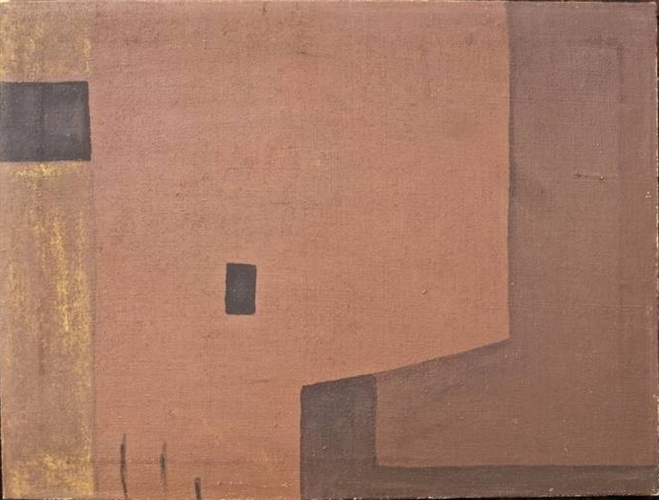

Untitled Located in NYC part of Private Collection 1956

- Untitled at the Museum of Modern Art, 1953
- Untitled, from the series Refrigerators (Geladeiras) at the Museum of Modern Art, 1960
- Untitled at the Museum of Modern Art, 1964
- Untitled from the series Graphic objects (Objetos gráficos) at the Museum of Modern Art, 1967
- Untitled from the series Splints (Sarrafos) at the Museum of Modern Art (1987)

Publications

- Grafische Reduktionen. Stuttgart, E. Walther, 1967.
- "O drama dos imigrantes europeus." Correio do Povo (Porto Alegre), January 7, 1950, pp. 1, 4.
