= Ghisha Koenig =

British sculptor

- Born: 8 December 1921; London, England
- Died: 15 October 1993 (aged 71)
- Education: Hornsey School of Art; Chelsea School of Art; Slade School of Art
- Known for: Sculpture
- Notable work: The Machine Minders
- Spouse: Emanuel "Manny" Tuckman
- Children: 1

Ghisha Koenig (8 December 1921 - 15 October 1993) was a British sculptor whose work focused on the work place, especially factories as a hub of human activity.

== Life ==
Ghisha Koenig was born in London on 8 December 1921, the daughter of Leo Koenig (1898-1970), art critic and writer, and his wife, Fanny Hildebrand (fl. 1900-1940), formerly a Yiddish actress. In 1950, she married Dr. Emanuel (Manny) Tuckman, and they had one daughter, Sarah. She died on 15 October 1993.

== Work ==
Koenig studied at the Hornsey School of Art, the Chelsea School of Art with Henry Moore, and the Slade School of Art. During World War II she was a member of the Auxiliary Territorial Service.

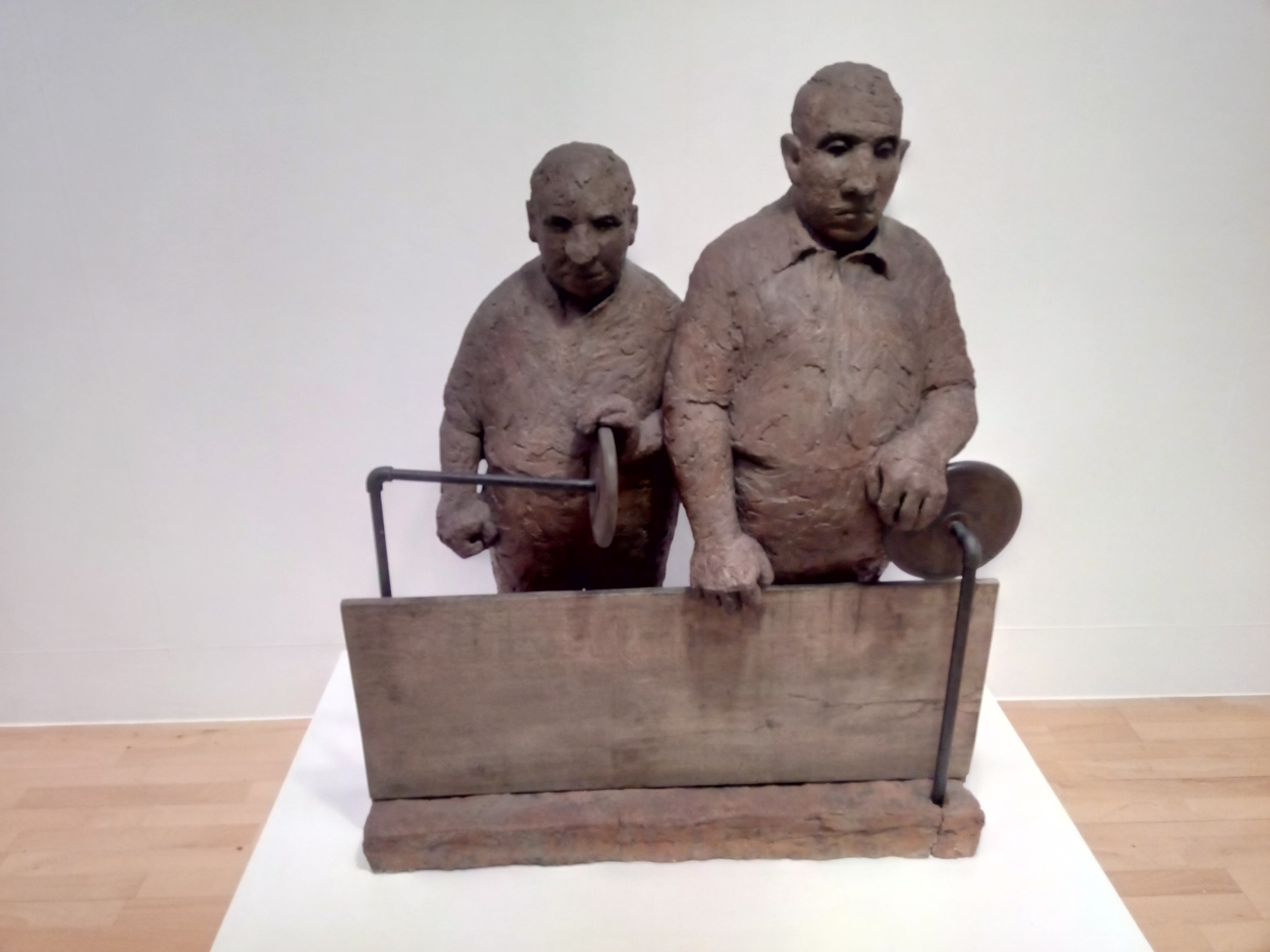
The Machine Minders by Ghisha Koenig

Between 1955 and 1956 she spent time observing and sketching people at work at an ink factory in Kent. The resulting sculpture was created in clay and made in cast concrete. It was called "The Machine Minders" and was at Tate Liverpool.

Her first solo exhibition was at the Grosvenor Gallery in London in 1966. She also had a solo exhibition at the Serpentine Gallery in London in 1986. This exhibition included works created from 1968 to 1986 from three series, The Glassworks, The Tentmakers and The Plate and Coil Shop. Factories she visited or worked at included J & E Hall, Dartford (APV Products Ltd) which made escalators and salination systems, the Plate and Coil Shop, and the Fettling Shop. Many of her sculptures are done in bronze or terracotta bas-reliefs.

Her work is in the permanent collection of the Tate Gallery, the Museum of Labour History in Manchester, Middleheim Museum in Belgium, the Graves Art Gallery in Sheffield, the City Art Gallery in Stoke-on Trent, Homerton College in Cambridge, and the City Art Gallery in Manchester. Public commissions include the Ministry of Work, 1950; Festival of Britain, 1951; St. John the Divine, 1961; Dalton House School, Sevenoaks, Kent 1986.

== Exhibitions ==
- 1953, 1958, 1960, 1963 The Royal Academy
- 1958-61 Society of Portrait Sculptors
- 1959 Smithsonian Institution, Washington
- 1963, 1964, 1966, 1968, Grosvenor Gallery, London
- 1974 Ghisha Koenig Sculpture 1968-74, Bedford House Gallery, London
- 1978 Wins Arts Council Award solo show at Galerie Husstege, Holland
- 1986 Ghisha Koenig: Sculpture 1968-1986, retrospective solo exhibition, Serpentine Gallery
- 1986, 1994, 2005, 2010 Boundary Gallery, London
- 1993 Tate Gallery, London
- 2017 Ghisha Koenig: Machines Restrict Their Movement, Henry Moore Institute, Leeds
