= List of Venezuelan Americans =

This is a list of notable Venezuelan Americans, including both original immigrants who obtained American citizenship and their American descendants.

To be included in this list, the person must have a Wikipedia article showing they are Venezuelan Americans or must have references showing they are Venezuelan Americans.

== List ==
=== Architects and builders ===
- Anita Berrizbeitia – Venezuelan landscape theorist, teacher, and author. Professor of Landscape Architecture at the Harvard Graduate School of Design
- Carlos Brillembourg – Venezuelan architect based in New York, founder of Carlos Brillembourg Architects
- Monica Ponce de Leon – architect with offices in Ann Arbor, New York and Boston. Dean of the School of Architecture at Princeton University. First Hispanic architect to receive the National Design Award in Architecture
- Carolina Izsak – After the pageant as Miss Venezuela 1991 she completed architecture studies and currently resides in Boston, Massachusetts, US
- Carlos Zapata– Venezuelan architect with his office headquartered in New York City

=== Entrepreneurs and business people ===
- Fabiola Beracasa Beckman – Venezuelan born film and television producer, philanthropist and co-owner of The Hole Gallery, an art gallery in New York City
- Peter Bottome (1937–2016) – American born raised in Venezuela businessman, co-owner of RCTV
- Adriana Cisneros – Venezuelan journalist, CEO and Chairman of Cisneros Group
- Patricia Phelps de Cisneros – Venezuelan philanthropist with focus on art collection and education
- Gustavo Cisneros – Venezuelan-born mass media entrepreneur
- Ella Fontanals-Cisneros – Cuban born, raised in Venezuela art collector, philanthropist, business woman and art dealer
- Nina Fuentes, a.k.a. Nina Dotti – Venezuelan art collector, curator, philanthropist, and art dealer
- Thor Halvorssen Hellum – Venezuelan-Norwegian businessman who served as President of CANTV and later as Special Commissioner for International Narcotic Affairs
- Carolina Herrera – fashion designer. Also Founder and CEO of New York-based CH Carolina Herrera
- Janet Kelly – American-born editor owner of The Daily Journal (Venezuela)
- Hilda Ochoa-Brillembourg – Venezuelan business woman and the current president of Strategic Investment Group (SIG)
- Isabel Lara, journalist and director of NPR first nominated as Chief Communications Officer.
- Solon De Leon Lobo – Venezuelan American editor, author
- Andres Levin – record producer
- Domingo Marcucci – shipbuilder and shipowner in San Francisco, California
- Nelson Mezerhane – banker, owner of Diario Las Americas of Miami, Florida
- Vanessa Neumann – Venezuelan graduated in Columbia University. Founder, President & CEO of Asymmetrica, a New York-headquartered global consultancy on brand integrity and counter-illicit trafficking. The relationship with Mick Jagger (2000–2002) made her famous among world press
- Bárbara Palacios – Venezuelan TV Host, writer and Miss Universe 1986. CEO of BP Inspiration, where she's the main motivational speaker
- Claudio Osorio – Venezuelan entrepreneur based in Miami, Florida
- Devorah Rose – Editor-in-Chief of Social Life Magazine
- Irene Saez – Miss Universe 1981, former director of ColonialBank
- Jimy Szymanski – former professional tennist was Davis cup captain and Fed cup captain for Venezuela. President of STA TENNIS LLC, a company that manages tennis facilities in South Florida.
- Bill Watkins – Venezuelan-born former CEO of Seagate Technology, the world's largest manufacturer of hard drives.

=== Artists and designers ===
- Julio Aguilera – Venezuelan-American painter and sculptor born in Caracas
- Devendra Banhart – Venezuelan American singer-songwriter and visual artist
- Juan Fernando Bastos – Venezuelan born painter
- Jorge Blanco – Venezuelan artist who created the comic strip The Castaway/El Náufrago, which became an overnight success
- Nicolas Felizola – fashion designer
- Rodner Figueroa – TV host, fashion designer and philanthropist
- Nina Fuentes, a.k.a. Nina Dotti – Venezuelan art collector, curator, philanthropist, business woman and art dealer
- Marisol Escobar – Venezuelan-American sculptor born in Paris
- Carolina Herrera – fashion designer. Also Founder and CEO of New York-based CH Carolina Herrera
- Martha Luna – fashion designer
- Tina Ramirez – dancer and choreographer, best known as the Founder and Artistic Director of Ballet Hispanico
- Angel Sanchez – fashion designer
- Jeanmarie Simpson - Theatre Artist and Peace Activist
- Nick Verreos – American fashion designer, fashion commentator and former Project Runway contestant
- Jhonen Vasquez – American comic book writer, cartoonist, and music video director
- Patricia van Dalen – Venezuelan visual artist based in Miami (Florida)
- Ron van Dongen – photographer
- Victor Hugo (artist and window dresser) – Venezuelan visual artist, window dresser, and Andy Warhol's collaborator, partner of fashion designer Halston.

=== Comedians ===
- Julio Gassete – Venezuelan-born TV former comedian of Bienvenidos TV show. He lives currently in Miami, Florida
- Joanna Hausmann – comedian, writer and actress
- Erika de la Vega – Venezuelan stand-up comedy actress and fashion model
- Monica Pasqualotto – actress, model and TV host in Americateve

=== Films and TV ===
- Cristina Abuhazi – Venezuelan actress, model, and TV host in Sony YouTube America Latina Network
- Arthur Albert – Venezuelan-born American cinematographer and television director
- America Alonso – Venezuelan actress
- Juan Carlos Ariza – Venezuelan director, writer & producer
- Fred Armisen – actor, comedian, musician. He attended the School of Visual Arts (NYC)
- Elizabeth Avellán – film producer, born in Venezuela
- Daniela Bascopé – American born, raised in Venezuela as telenovela actress
- Maria Beatty – Venezuelan-born American filmmaker who directs, acts, and produces
- Fabiola Beracasa Beckman – Venezuelan film and television producer and philanthropist; co-owner of The Hole Gallery, in New York City
- Horacio Bocaranda – film director
- Víctor Cámara – actor
- Tatiana Capote – telenovela actress; Cuban-born, Venezuelan-raised
- Rosa Castro Martínez – silent movie actress
- Grecia Colmenares – actress of telenovelas who gained fame across Latin America, especially during the 1980s
- Gabriel Coronel – actor of telenovelas, singer, and model
- Jesse Corti – Venezuelan-born, American voice actor
- Alejandro Chaban – Venezuelan-born, telenovela actor
- Mara Croatto – Venezuelan-born Puerto Rican actress
- Majandra Delfino – Venezuelan born actress
- Cameron Diaz – American-born actress of Venezuelan, Cuban, and Spanish descent
- Christina Dieckmann – Venezuelan-born actress
- Andrew Divoff – Venezuelan-born actor
- Wanda D'Isidoro – Venezuelan actress, born in Boston
- Perla Farias – Venezuelan-born screen writer, and TV producer
- Pablo Fenjves – Venezuelan-born American screenwriter and ghostwriter based in Los Angeles, California
- Lupita Ferrer – Venezuelan-born actress based in Miami, Florida
- Cat Fletcher – Venezuelan-born film director and producer
- Silvana Gallardo (1953–2012) – American film and television actress
- Carlos González – Venezuelan-born American cinematographer and director of film and television
- Scarlet Gruber – Venezuelan actress and dancer
- Perla Haney-Jardine – Brazilian-born American actress; best known for her role in Kill Bill Vol. 2 as B.B. His father is Venezuelan born
- Michel Hausmann – Venezuelan-born theater director and producer
- Alejandro Hernández Reinoso – Venezuelan film director, writer, humorist, singer-songwriter, composer
- Lilimar Hernandez – Venezuelan actress
- Gledys Ibarra – Venezuelan television actress
- Betty Kaplan – Venezuelan film director, currently live in Los Angeles
- Moisés Kaufman – playwright, director and founder of Tectonic Theater Project; in 2016 was awarded with the National Medal of Arts
- Kamala Lopez – actress, director, and political activist
- Alicia Machado – Venezuelan actress, Miss Universe 1996
- Willy Martin – Venezuelan-born, telenovela actor at Nickelodeon
- Beatriz Michelena – actress and film producer
- Fernando Michelena – actor and singer
- Vera Michelena – actress and singer
- Teresa Luisa Michelena (1889–1941) – screenwriter and actress; daughter of Venezuelan tenor Fernando Michelena (1858–1921)
- Carlos Montilla – Venezuelan television and theater actor; starred popular as character role of Emilliano Galvez Escorza in Mariú
- Lilibeth Morillo – actress
- Carlos Pena Jr. – American actor (Big Time Rush), singer, and dancer; father is of Spanish and Venezuelan descent
- Clara Perez – film and television actress
- Elluz Peraza – Miss Venezuela 1976, actress
- Lele Pons – Venezuelan-born Internet personality and actress
- Abraham Pulido– Venezuelan-born film director
- Édgar Ramírez – Venezuelan actor
- Julie Restifo – actress, American-born, Venezuelan-raised
- Genesis Rodriguez – American actress of Venezuelan and Cuban descent
- Monica Rubio - Venezuelan actress
- Enrique Sapene – Venezuelan-born actor and producer based in Los Angeles
- Luis José Santander – American-born Venezuelan actor
- Sonya Smith – American-born Venezuelan actress starred as Coralia Lozada de Gálvez in Mariú
- Jason Silva – television personality, filmmaker, and public speaker
- Monica Spear (1984–2014) – Miss Venezuela 2004, actress of Telemundo network
- Carolina Tejera – Venezuelan-born actress
- Laura Termini – Venezuelan-born American actress, producer, writer, and a Board Certified Health/Beauty Counselor AADP
- Orlando Urdaneta – Venezuelan actor
- Wilmer Valderrama – American actor of Venezuelan and Colombian descent
- Diego Vicentini - producer, director of movie Simon
- Franklin Virgüez – actor
- Erich Wildpret – actor
- Henry Zakka – Venezuelan actor and producer

=== Models ===
- Consuelo Adler – Venezuelan top model, Miss International 1997
- Noelia Voigt Briceño, Miss USA 2023, first Venezuelan-American woman win the Miss USA title.
- Carmen María Montiel – Venezuelan pageant titleholder and journalist. Miss Venezuela 1984, Miss Universe 1984 2nd runner up. She lives in USA since 1989.
- Jennifer Rovero – Playboy's Playmate of the Month for July 1999 and has appeared in numerous Playboy videos
- Rita Verreos – Venezuelan-born beauty pageant contestant, image consultant, model, actress, and reality television contestant
- Patricia Velásquez – Venezuelan actress and fashion model

=== Musicians ===
- Alfredo Rugeles – American born-Venezuelan composer and conductor
- Gregory Abbott – American born singer, his father was born in Venezuela
- Aldo Abreu – Venezuelan baroque flutist
- Daniela Avanzini – Venezuelan and Cuban descent, singer, dancer, and member of Katseye
- María Conchita Alonso – three time Grammy Award–nominated singer/songwriter and actress. Cuban-born, Venezuelan-raised, she is an American citizen
- Devendra Banhart – Singer and songwriter
- Josefina Benedetti – Venezuelan-American composer, musicologist and choral director.
- Augusto Brandt – violinist and composer
- Andréa Burns – singer
- Ed Calle – saxophonist and composer from Miami, Florida, born in Venezuela. He has four nominations for Grammy Awards
- Mariah Carey – singer; her father Alfred Roy Carey was born in Venezuela
- Teresa Carreño – Venezuelan-born pianist and composer
- Sylvia Constantinidis – Venezuelan-born pianist, conductor, composer, writer and music educator. President of the Southeast Chapter of NACUSA (National Association of Composers of The United States of America)
- Tulio Cremisini – Venezuelan percussionist, guitarist, composer and orchestra conductor
- Majandra Delfino – ALMA Award-nominated Venezuelan-born American actress and singer
- Yasmin Deliz – American singer-songwriter, model and actress. She is daughter of Dominican father and a Colombian-Venezuelan mother
- Paul Desenne – Venezuelan cellist and resident composer at Alabama Symphony Orchestra
- Gustavo Dudamel – orchestra conductor and violinist. He is the music director of the Los Angeles Philharmonic in Los Angeles, California
- Pedro Eustache – flautist, "World Music" woodwinds-reeds-wind synthesizers and composer
- Lorenzo Herrera – former Venezuelan singer
- Hernan Hermida – vocalist of rock band Suicide Silence
- Enrique Hidalgo – Venezuelan composer
- Judith Jaimes – pianist
- Raphael Jiménez – associate professor of conducting and director of Oberlin College orchestras
- Rudy La Scala – singer and composer
- Andres Levin-musician, record producer, bandleader
- Pablo Manavello – Italian-born Venezuelan composer, guitarist, singer and songwriter
- Manu Manzo – Venezuelan-born singer and songwriter
- Eduardo Marturet – composer, music director and principal conductor of The Miami Symphony Orchestra
- Gustavo Matamoros – composer-sound artist
- Alfredo del Monaco – Venezuelan composer
- Silvano Monasterios – jazz pianist and composer
- Ricardo Montaner – Venezuelan singer and composer
- Gabriela Montero – pianist and composer
- Chris Moy – singer and former member of the Menudo teen group
- Luis Perdomo – jazz pianist and composer
- Allan Phillips – music producer, composer, arranger, and musician now residing in Southern California.
- Alejandro Enrique Planchart – Venezuelan-American musicologist, conductor, and composer
- Edward Pulgar – Venezuelan violinist and conductor
- Rudy Regalado – Venezuelan Latin music leader, percussionist and composer
- Jose Luis Rodríguez "El Puma" – singer and actor
- Otmaro Ruíz – pianist and composer
- Juan Carlos Salazar – singer, Cuatro-player and songwriter/composer in addition to being an engineer with an MBA, and university instructor
- Marger Sealey – singer, composer and actress
- Alberto Šlezinger – Venezuelan-born singer-songwriter and composer
- Jorge Spiteri– Venezuelan-born guitarist, singer-songwriter and composer. His father was born in USA
- Carmen Helena Téllez – Venezuelan-American music conductor
- Zamora – Venezuelan pianist and composer nominated on Grammy Award 2010 in the "New Age" music category
- Kid 606 - Venezuelan-American electronic musician

=== Sports ===
- Bob Abreu – Venezuelan baseball player
- Jose Altuve – Venezuelan baseball player for the Houston Astros and 2017 World Series champion
- Junior Alvarado - jockey
- Luis Aparicio – baseball player. Hall of Fame of MLB
- Nestor Aparicio – sportswriter and radio personality
- José de Armas – professional tennis player
- Fannie Barrios – professional female bodybuilder
- Josh Barfield – Venezuelan-born American major league Baseball player
- Gregor Blanco – Venezuelan Major League Baseball player
- Andrés Borregales - Venezuelan kicker of New England Patriots
- Jesus Armando Bracho – Venezuelan jockey winner of the Eclipse Award for Outstanding Apprentice Jockey in 1992 but was suspended, then surrendered his award to Rosemary Homeister, Jr. for falsifying his racing papers
- Miguel Cabrera – baseball player. In 2012 became the first player since Carl Yastrzemski in 1967 to win the Triple Crown in batting
- Alfonso Carrasquel – Venezuelan-born Major League Baseball player
- Deyna Castellanos – Venezuelan footballer
- Abel Castellano Jr. – Venezuelan jockey
- Javier Castellano – Venezuelan jockey, recipient of four Eclipse Award for Outstanding Jockey in the row (2013, 2014, 2015 and 2016). In 2017 was inductee into the National Museum of Racing and Hall of Fame.
- Mauro Cichero – footballer
- Jhoulys Chacín – baseball player
- Ciclón Negro - wrestler
- Omar Atlas - wrestler
- Eibar Coa – Venezuelan jockey winner of the Breeder's Cup Sprint 2010
- John Cox – Venezuelan-born basketball player.
- Daniel Dhers – world champion BMX cycle ryder
- Milka Duno – Venezuelan-born Indycar driver
- Eduardo Escobar – baseball player
- Vito Fassano – Italian Venezuelan footballer
- Juan Pablo Galavis – professional footballer
- Ozzie Guillén – former major league professional baseball player and manager of Chicago White Sox and Miami Marlins
- Ramon Dominguez – jockey, recipient of three Eclipse Award in the row (2010, 2011 and 2012). In 2016 was inductee into the National Museum of Racing and Hall of Fame.
- Marcy Hinzmann – American pairs figure skater; her mother was born in Venezuela
- Carlos Hernández (catcher) – Venezuelan baseball player
- Dwight Lewis – Venezuelan born professional basket player
- Gonzalo López Silvero – Cuban-born sports narrator of Venevision
- Jesús Luzardo – baseball player
- AnnMaria De Mars – American judoka
- Richard Mendez – football narrator of ESPN Deportes
- Amleto Monacelli – professional ten-pin bowler, member of American Bowlers Association Halls of Fame
- Ivan Olivares – professional basket player
- Julianna Peña – American mixed martial artist
- Eddie Pérez – Venezuelan-American former professional baseball player and current coach
- Salvador Perez – baseball player
- C.J. Perry – American professional wrestling valet, professional wrestler, model, actress, dancer, and singer. Her mother was born in Venezuela
- Alex Popow – Venezuelan racing driver
- Enzo Potolicchio – Venezuelan racing driver and businessman
- Gabriel Rincones Jr. – American baseball player
- Ronda Rousey – American mixed martial artist, judoka and actress
- Sam Shepherd – American naturalized as a Venezuelan, in order to be able to play with the Venezuelan national basketball team
- Giovanni Savarese – Venezuelan head coach of New York Cosmos and Portland Timbers soccer clubs. 2015-16 NEC Hall of Fame Inductee
- Donta Smith – American naturalized as a Venezuelan, in order to be able to play with the Venezuelan national basketball team
- Rafael Suárez – Venezuelan Olympian fencer and US international team fencer
- María Alejandra Vento-Kabchi – former professional tennis player
- Cheche Vidal – Venezuelan American soccer player and businessman
- Omar Vizquel – Venezuelan baseball player

=== Journalists, TV hosts and anchors ===
- Carlos Acosta– TV host of EVTV and TVV of Miami
- Eduardo Aleman – radio host in Charlando en caliente at La Nueva Poderosa 670 am of Miami, Fl
- Rayne Anciani – TV journalist of UNIVISION 23 Miami
- Carla Angola – TV host of EVTV Miami
- Mariana Atencio – journalist and news personality for MSNBC and NBC News. The Huffington Post called her "Our Latina Christiane Amanpour"
- Eleonora Bruzual – writer and journalist of El Nacional and El Nuevo Herald. Conduct a daily radio segment called "Trinchera" on Radio Mambi of Miami (Florida).
- Michelle Badillo – Venezuelan TV host and model
- Luis Gerardo Bucci – Venezuelan-journalist TV host at CNN Sports
- Boris Muñoz – Venezuelan-journalis of New York Times
- Carlos López Bustamante – journalist spent part of his life in the US, where he died in Chicago
- Nelson Bustamante – Venezuelan-born TV host and writer
- Lindsay Casinelli – Venezuelan TV host of Univision network and Telemundo
- Chiquinquirá Delgado – Venezuelan TV host, model, and actress of Univision network in the United States
- George Duran – Venezuelan-born restaurateur, TV personality, TV producer, and published author
- Lorena Garcia – Venezuelan-born restaurateur, philanthropist, TV personality, TV producer, and published author
- Humberto Garcia – host in La Nueva Poderosa 670 am of Miami, Fl
- Raúl González – TV host and actor; in Venezuela, he hosted a kids' TV show Supercrópolis; became one of the hosts of TV show Despierta América of Univisión television network
- Eva Golinger – attorney, RT Network TV host and editor of the Correo del Orinoco International
- Alejandra Oraa – Venezuelan television anchor currently working for CNN en Español
- Reinaldo Herrera – former director of Vanity Fair magazine
- Alfredo Peña – Venezuelan journalist and politician. He died exiled in Miami in 2016
- Elizabeth Pérez – Cuban-Venezuelan Emmy – winning television journalist and presenter working for CNN en Español
- Luisana Pérez Fernández – Venezuelan-American communications expert and political advisor; currently serves as the director of Hispanic media for the Joe Biden administration
- Rafael Poleo – Venezuelan journalist and politician
- Carolina Sandoval – journalist, broadcaster, writer, TV presenter, and actress
- Daniel Sarcos – Venezuelan TV host, model, and actor of Telemundo network in the United States
- Alberto Sardiñas – Venezuelan born syndicated radio personality
- Polo Troconis – Venezuelan radio host in Miami, FL
- James Tahhan – Venezuelan-born restaurateur known as "Chef James", TV personality, TV producer, and published author
- Patricia Zavala – Venezuelan TV host and model; hosts E! Entertainment Television's Coffee Break

=== Military ===
- Leopoldo Baptista - Venezuelan militar. He lived exiliated the last years in New York until his dead in 1931.
- Renato Beluche – Louisiana merchant and privateer at service of Simon Bolivar army who died in Puerto Cabello, Venezuela
- José Manuel Hernández – popular Venezuelan caudillo, army general, congressman, presidential candidate and cabinet member who was also involved in numerous insurrections. Lived in exile in US from 1911 to his death in 1921
- Narciso López – Venezuelan soldier and adventurer, known for four filibuster expeditions aimed at liberating Cuba from Spain rule in the 1850s. Following his final failed attempt he was captured and garroted for treason in Havana.
- José Antonio Páez – Venezuelan leader who fought the War of Independence. President of Venezuela once it was independent of the Gran Colombia (1830–1835; 1839–1843; 1861–1863). He lived exiliated the last years in New York, where he became a philanthropist until 1863.
- Patricia Spanic – captain in the US Army. She is sister of soap opera actress Gabriela Spanic.

=== Politics ===
- Luigi Boria – Venezuelan-born former mayor of Doral, Florida
- Peter Camejo (1939–2008) – American left-wing activist and Green Party politician. He was of Venezuelan descent.
- Cipriano Castro – President of Venezuela. Expatriated by Juan Vicente Gomez regime in 1908, spent the rest of his life in exile, mostly in Puerto Rico, where he died in 1928
- Antonio Delgado – Lieutenant Governor of New York and former U.S. Representative for New York's 19th Congressional District
- Diogenes Escalante – former ambassador of Venezuela in Washington. Spent his last twenty years in USA.
- Philip Giordano – former Republican mayor of Waterbury, Connecticut, and a convicted sex offender. He was born in Caracas, Venezuela, to Italian parents and his family moved to the United States when he was two years old
- Henrique Salas Feo, born in New Haven, Connecticut, to Venezuelan parents and raised in Venezuela. He was the governor of Carabobo (1996–2004; 2008–2012) and is currently exiled in the U.S.
- P. Michael McKinley – American diplomat and the United States Ambassador to Afghanistan
- Nancy Navarro – social activist. In 2010, President Obama appointed her to the Advisory Commission on Educational Excellence for Hispanics
- Patricia Rucker – member of the West Virginia House of Representatives
- Irene Sáez – Venezuelan politician and beauty queen who was crowned Miss Universe 1981
- Leopoldo Martínez Nucete – born in Caracas; author, former Congressman in Venezuela (2000–2005), first Venezuelan American to become DNC Member (2017–2021). President Biden Nominee for U.S. Executive Director of the Inter American Development Bank.
- Juan Pablo Villasmil – member of the Center for a Secure, Free Society and Dissident Project

=== Science ===
- Cristina Amon – Venezuelan-born Dean of the University of Toronto Faculty of Applied Science and Engineering
- Baruj Benacerraf – Venezuelan-born American immunologist, 1980 Nobel Prize in Medicine for the discovery of the major histocompatibility complex genes
- Manuel Blum – Venezuelan-born computer scientist who received the Turing Award in 1995
- Emma Brossard – sociologist expert in oil and gas themes
- Florinda Donner – Venezuelan anthropologist
- José Esparza – Venezuelan virologist known for his efforts to promote the international development and testing of vaccines against HIV/AIDS
- Humberto Fernandez Moran – Venezuelan research NASA scientist winner of the John Scott Award, for his invention of the diamond knife
- Niklaus Grünwald – Venezuelan-born biologist; currently a research scientist with the USDA Agricultural Research Service
- Werner Hoeger – Venezuelan-born professor emeritus (active) of exercise science at Boise State University
- Carlos Machado-Allison – American born Venezuelan biologist
- Luise Margolies – American born archeologist raised in Venezuela
- Evelyn Miralles – Principal Engineer and Lead Virtual Reality Innovator at NASA Johnson Space Center
- William H. Phelps, Jr. – American-born Venezuelan ornithologist and businessman
- William H. Phelps, Sr. – Venezuelan American ornithologist and businessman
- L. Rafael Reif – Venezuelan electrical engineer. President of the Massachusetts Institute of Technology {2012 to 2022}
- Aldemaro Romero Jr. – Venezuelan biologist, dean of the College of Arts and Sciences at Southern Illinois University Edwardsville
- Gustavo Adolfo Romero – biologist, curator of Herbarium of Harvard University
- Gabriel A. Rincon-Mora – Venezuelan-American electrical engineer, scientist, professor, inventor, and author
- Ignacio Rodríguez-Iturbe – Venezuelan-American hydrologist
- Alejandro Sánchez Alvarado – molecular biologist
- Mayly Sánchez – Venezuelan-born particle physicist who researches at Iowa State University
- Santiago Schnell – Venezuelan-born biophysical chemist and computational physiologist who holds an Associate Professorship in Molecular & Integrative Physiology at the University of Michigan. As of July 2025, he is the provost of Dartmouth College.
- Julian Alfred Steyermark – American born biologist, naturalized Venezuelan

=== Economists ===
- Ricardo Ernst – economist and author. He is a professor at the McDonough School of Business at Georgetown University
- Ricardo Hausmann – economist, writer, Harvard University professor
- Moisés Naím – economist, Foreign Police chief editor, writer, TV host
- Daniel Di Martino - economist and conservative speaker

=== Writers ===
- Antonio Arraiz – Venezuelan writer
- Alegría Bendayán de Bendelac – writer and Jewish poet
- Perla Farías Lombardini – Telemundo writer
- Boris Izaguirre – Spanish Venezuelan writer and Telemundo TV host
- T. J. MacGregor – Venezuelan-born writer
- Boris Muñoz, journalist and essayst
- Nery Santos Gómez – American-Venezuelan writer
- Susana Rotker – writer, essayist
- Miguel Tinker Salas – Venezuela historian, writer and professor at Pomona College (California)
- Tui T. Sutherland – Venezuelan born writer

=== Activists ===
- Mery Godigna Collet – Venezuelan artist, writer, philanthropist and environmental living in Austin, Texas
- Thor Halvorssen Mendoza – Venezuelan human rights advocate and film producer
- Nancy Navarro – social activist. In 2010, President Obama appointed her to the Advisory Commission on Educational Excellence for Hispanics
- Victor Pineda (activist) – social development scholar and disability rights advocate
- Nathalie Rayes – Venezuelan born, human rights advocate. She is president and CEO of Latino Victory and vice-chair of the Hispanic Federation
- Jeanmarie Simpson – American peace activist and theatre artist. His father is Venezuelan.
- Sylvia Rivera – American bisexual transgender activist and trans woman

=== Others ===
- Federico A. Moreno – lawyer and former Chief Judge of United States District Court for the Southern District of Florida
- Diego Ruiz – League of Legends player based in Los Angeles
- Noelia Voigt – first Venezuelan-American Miss Utah USA, and Miss USA 2023, model, esthetician, interior design student, and beauty pageant titleholder. Her mother is from Zulia.

== See also ==
- Venezuelan American
- Venezuelan Canadian
- Venezuelan people
- List of Venezuelans
- List of Canadians
- List of Americans
