= Luisana Pérez =

Luisana Pérez may refer to:

- Luisana Pérez (journalist), director of Hispanic media for the Joe Biden administration
- Luisana Pérez (table tennis), Venezuelan table tennis player
