= Brian A. Murdock =

American businessman (born 1956)

Brian A. Murdock (born 1956) is the president and chief executive officer of Strategic Investment Group.

== Early life ==
Brian Murdock was born in March 1956 in Newport Beach, California, and grew up in the New York City area.

He earned a BS in economics from Cornell University.

== Previous career ==
Murdock was previously the chairman and CEO of TD Asset Management in Toronto. Prior to that, he was the president and CEO of New York Life Investment Management in New York.

Murdock previously spent 25 years at Merrill Lynch as a portfolio manager, chief investment officer, and regional executive officer based in London, Hong Kong, and Tokyo. His last role at Merrill Lynch was chief operating officer and head of the U.S. asset management business based in Princeton, New Jersey.

== Strategic Investment Group ==
Murdock was named president and CEO of Strategic Investment Group in August 2014. He is also a member of its board of managers.

Strategic Investment Group was founded in 1987 and is a pioneer in outsourced chief investment officer (OCIO) solutions.

The firm had about $37.5 billion in assets under management as of March 30, 2015.

== Volunteer activity ==
Murdock serves on a number of non-profit boards. He serves as president of the Craigielea Education Fund at Cornell University, co-chair of the Trinity College Parent Directors, trustee for the National Review Institute, and is a member of the Mount Vernon Life Guard Society.

== Media appearances ==
He has been published in magazines and newspapers in several countries, including India, China, and the UK, and has appeared many times on Bloomberg, Asia Business News, and CNBC.

== Personal life ==
Murdock is married and has four children. He and his wife, Debbie, live in Washington, D.C.
