= Carlos Brillembourg =

American architect

- Born: Caracas, Venezuela
- Education: Columbia University
- Years active: 1975–present
- Website: carlosbrillembourgarchitects.com

Carlos Brillembourg is an architect based in New York City. He is the owner of Carlos Brillembourg Architects, a firm that he founded in 1984.

Brillembourg was an author and the editor of Latin American Architecture 1929–1960: Contemporary Reflections, which was published in 2004. He has been the contributing editor for architecture for Bomb magazine since 1992.

== Early life and education ==
Brillembourg was born in Caracas, and his family moved to Long Island when he was 8. He received his Master's in architecture from Columbia University in 1975.

== Career ==
=== Early jobs ===
After graduating, Brillembourg worked at W.J. Alcock, an architecture firm in Caracas and later at Mitchell/Giurgola in New York. In 1980, he founded his own practice, Brillembourg Arquitectos y Urbanistas in Caracas. Later, he established an office in New York and maintained two offices until 1998.

Brillembourg was a founding member of the Instituto de Arquitectura Urbana (IAU) in Caracas (1977). As the director of this organization, he led a team of twenty architects that produced urban design solutions for the city of Caracas and other cities such as Ciudad Guyana. Parallel to his practice, he has taught at the Simon Bolivar University in Caracas, the Institute for Architecture and Urban Studies, in New York, and Columbia University's Graduate School of Architecture, Planning and Preservation.

=== Recent positions and awards ===
Brillembourg received The Biennial of Architecture Award in Venezuela for a single-family residence (Palmasola). His proposal for a New World Center was exhibited in the American pavilion of the Architecture Biennial in Venice 2002.

Brillembourg was an author and the editor of Latin American Architecture 1929–1960: Contemporary Reflections, which was published in 2004. He has been the contributing editor for Architecture for Bomb magazine since 1992.

== Personal life ==
Brillembourg is married to Karin Waisman, an artist. Their house in Southampton, which they designed, has been featured in multiple publications.

== Awards and honors ==
- 2013 – Fellow of the American Institute of Architects

== Notable projects ==
- Sportscenter Interalumina 1982–84
- World Arts Center 2002
- Hildreth House 2007
- Sagaponak 1983–2010

== Bibliography ==
- Latin American Architecture 1929–1960: Contemporary Reflections (2004)
- Caracas: Towards A New City 1938–1958
- Unbuilt. Raimund Abraham (2011)
- Beyond The Supersquare (2013)

== See also ==
- List of Venezuelan Americans
