= Gabriel A. Rincon-Mora =

Venezuelan-American engineer

Gabriel Alfonso Rincón-Mora is a Venezuelan-American/Hispanic-American electrical engineer, scientist, professor, inventor, and author who was elected fellow of the American National Academy of Inventors (NAI) in 2017,, fellow of the American Association for the Advancement of Science (AAAS) in 2025, Fellow of the Institute of Electrical and Electronics Engineers (IEEE) in 2011, and Fellow of the Institution of Engineering and Technology (IET) in 2009 for contributions to energy-harvesting and power-supply integrated circuits (ICs). Rincón-Mora is the Motorola Solutions Foundation Professor at the Georgia Institute of Technology, where he's been Adjunct/Assistant/Associate/Full Professor since 1999.

== Biography ==
Rincón-Mora was born in Caracas, Venezuela in 1972, grew up in Maracay, and migrated to North Miami Beach in the United States when he was 11 years old. He graduated from North Miami Beach Senior High School in 1989, from Florida International University with a Bachelor of Science (B.S.) degree in Electrical Engineering in 1992, Georgia Tech with a Masters of Science (M.S.) degree in Electrical Engineering and a Minor in Mathematics in 1994, and Georgia Tech with a Ph.D. in Electrical Engineering in 1996 and a dissertation on "Current Efficient, Low Voltage, Low Dropout Regulators."

He was IC Designer and Design Team Leader at Texas Instruments in 1994–2003, adjunct professor at the School of Electrical and Computer Engineering at Georgia Tech in 1999–2001, Director of the Georgia Tech Analog Consortium in 2001–2004, is professor at Georgia Tech since 2001, and visiting professor at National Cheng Kung University (NCKU) in Taiwan since 2011.

== Professional work ==
Rincón-Mora has written several books, book chapters, and over 200 other publications. His work has generated 44 patents. He has designed over 26 commercial power-chip designs and delivered over 160 keynotes/lectures/speeches worldwide.

His work and research is on the design and development of silicon-based microsystems that draw and condition power from tiny batteries, fuel cells, and generators that harness ambient energy from motion, light, temperature, and radiation to supply mobile, portable, and self-sustaining devices such as wireless microsensors for biomedical, consumer, industrial, and military applications. He has worked on voltage references, low-dropout regulators, switching dc-dc converters, and energy-harvesting microsystems.

19 of his licensed patents, 2 of his books, and 9 of the commercial microchips he designed describe how linear regulators can suppress noise, reduce power, and accelerate response. Another 6 of his licensed patents, another 2 of his books, and 17 other commercial microchips he designed describe how switching power supplies can regulate their outputs within millivolts of their targets and respond to load dumps within one switching cycle. The technology that another 15 of his licensed patents and another one of his books (on voltage references) describe was also integrated into these and other products that were sold worldwide.

He developed, designed, and built microchips that derive power from light, motion (piezoelectrically and electrostatically), and heat. He also developed technology that transfers power wirelessly. 3 of his book chapters, 71 of his scientific articles, and one of his licensed patents describe how to draw and deliver power with the least losses, invest energy so the transducer can draw more ambient power, and keep the system at the maximum power point.

== Awards ==
Texas Instruments awarded him a Three-Year Patent Award for U.S. 5,491,437, U.S. 5,500,625, and U.S. 5,519,341 in 1999; Hispanic Business Magazine voted him one of "The 100 Most Influential Hispanics" in 2000; the Society of Hispanic Professional Engineers (SHPE) awarded him the National Hispanic in Technology Award in 2000; Florida International University (FIU) awarded him the Charles E. Perry Visionary Award in 2000; the Georgia Institute of Technology (Georgia Tech) inducted him into its Council of Outstanding Young Engineering Alumni in 2000; former Lieutenant Governor Cruz Bustamante of California presented him a State of California Commendation Certificate in 2001; Robins Air Force Base presented him the Orgullo Hispano Award in 2003 and the Hispanic Heritage Award in 2005; IEEE presented him the IEEE Service Award in 2007; The IEEE Circuits and Systems Society awarded him the IEEE Charles A. Desoer Technical Achievement Award in 2025, the Georgia Institute of Technology awarded him the Distinguished Faculty Achievement Award in 2025, the IEEE Region 3 awarded him the IEEE Joseph M. Biedenbach Outstanding Engineering Educator Award in 2025, the IEEE Atlanta Section awarded him the IEEE Outstanding Educator Award in 2024, and IEEE Circuits and Systems Society (CASS) named him IEEE Distinguished Lecturer in 2009–2010, 2018–2019, 2022–2023, and 2026–2027.

== Publications ==
Current Efficient, Low Voltage, Low Dropout Regulators. Georgia Institute of Technology, 1996 (Ph.D. dissertation, advisor Prof. Phil Allen).

Voltage References. New Jersey: IEEE Press and John Wiley & Sons, Inc. (192 pages), 2001 [Translated into Chinese].

Analog IC Design with Low-Dropout Regulators. New York: McGraw-Hill (400 pages), Jan. 2009 [Translated into Chinese].

Analog IC Design with Low-Dropout Regulators, Second Edition. New York: McGraw-Hill (507 pages), 2014.
