= Small Press Flea =

Annual small-press book fair in Brooklyn, New York

- Status: Active
- Genre: Book fair; zine fair
- Location(s): Brooklyn, New York, U.S.
- Years active: 2013–present
- Organized by: BOMB Magazine; formerly co-presented with Brooklyn Public Library

The Small Press Flea (SPF), sometimes listed as the Brooklyn Small Press Flea, is an annual outdoor fair in Brooklyn, New York City, that showcases independent presses, literary magazines, and zine makers. The event typically takes place in August and has featured dozens of publishers and magazines each year. In 2024 the fair moved from the steps of the Brooklyn Public Library’s Central Library at Grand Army Plaza to Amant, a contemporary art center in East Williamsburg.

== History ==
BOMB Magazine organized the inaugural Small Press Flea in 2013 in the backyard of Unnameable Books, with a dozen participating presses, before expanding the fair in subsequent years. By the mid-2010s, SPF was regularly held on the plaza of the Brooklyn Public Library’s Central Library at Grand Army Plaza and was co-presented by BOMB and the Library. Local coverage highlighted the growth of the fair and its roster of small and independent publishers.

After the COVID-19 pandemic in 2020 reduced many in-person literary events, SPF returned in 2021 on the Library’s steps and continued there in 2022.

In 2024, BOMB announced that SPF would relocate to Amant in East Williamsburg.

== Programming and format ==
SPF is typically an outdoor marketplace featuring tables for small presses, nonprofit publishers, and magazines, with book and zine sales, signings, and occasional workshops. In 2024, Amant hosted additional programming such as a zine-making workshop alongside the fair; the day concluded with an evening market and music. The event has been described as a summer market of "local publishers and magazines," with vendors offering discounted or special-edition titles.

== Exhibitors ==
Over the years, participating presses have included A Public Space, Ugly Duckling Presse, Verso Books, Nightboat Books, Zone Books, Printed Matter, and others from New York and beyond.

== See also ==
- Brooklyn Book Festival
- NY Art Book Fair
