= Bomb (magazine) =

American arts magazine edited by artists and writers

- Cover of Bomb Magazine, Volume 1 Issue 1, Spring 1981 designed by Sarah Charlesworth
- Editors: Betsy Sussler, Benjamin Samuel, Tyler Considine, Juwon Jun, Janée A. Moses
- Categories: Arts magazine
- Frequency: Quarterly
- Circulation: 14,000
- First issue: Spring 1981
- Company: New Arts Publications, Inc.
- Country: United States
- Based in: New York City
- Language: English
- Website: bombmagazine.org
- ISSN: 0743-3204

Bomb (stylized in all caps as BOMB) is an interdisciplinary American arts magazine edited by artists and writers, published quarterly in print and daily online. It is composed primarily of interviews between creative people working in a variety of disciplines—visual art, literature, film, music, theater, architecture, and dance. Bomb also publishes reviews of literature, film, and music, as well as new poetry and fiction.

Many of the contributing editors to the magazine are established artists, musicians, and writers, such as Kara Walker, David Byrne, Roxane Gay, and Colm Tóibín. However, over 50 percent of their writers are under 30.

== History ==
Bomb was launched in 1981 by a group of New York City-based artists, including Betsy Sussler, Sarah Charlesworth, Glenn O'Brien, Michael McClard, and Liza Béar, who sought to record and promote public conversations between artists without mediation by critics or journalists.

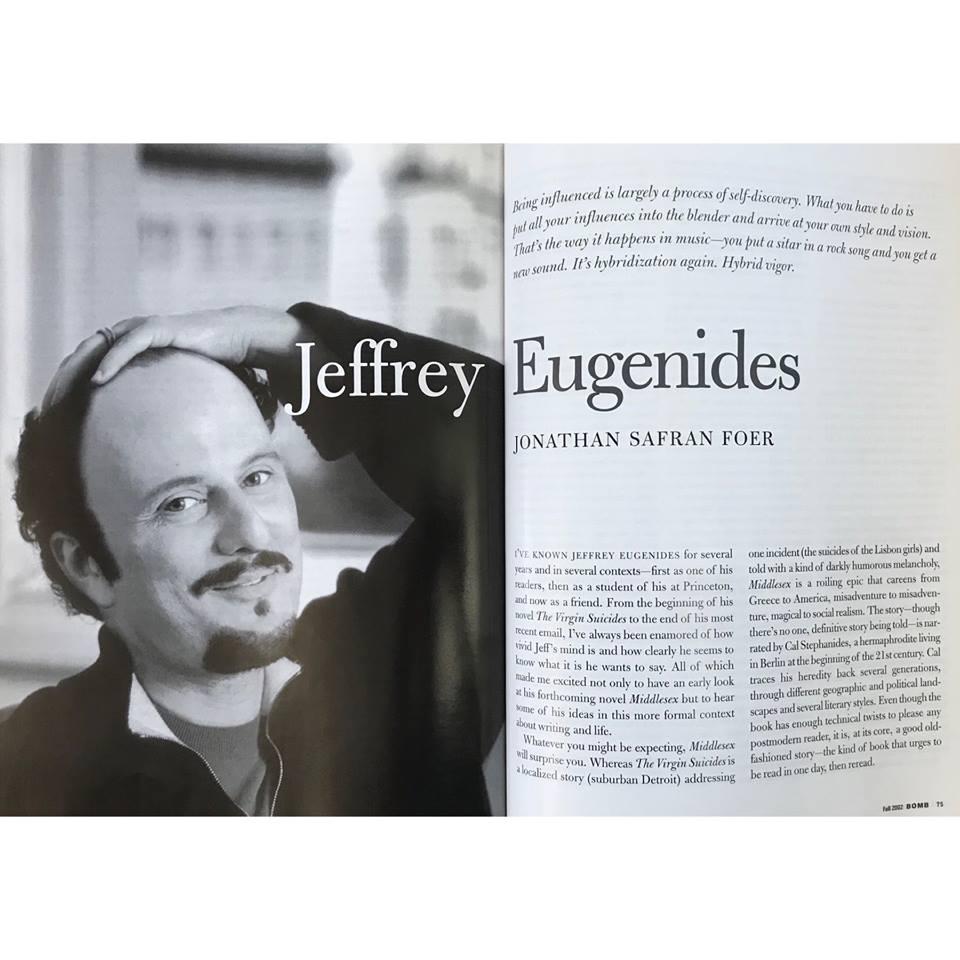
Jeffrey Eugenides spread for issue #81

The name Bomb is a reference to both Wyndham Lewis' Blast and the fact that the magazine's original editors expected the publication to "bomb" after one or two issues. Shortly after its founding, Bomb formed a 501(c)(3) non-profit organization, New Art Publications, Inc., which publishes the journal.

In 2005, the Bomb offices moved from the SoHo neighborhood of New York City, New York, to Fort Greene, Brooklyn. By December 2019, Bomb had published one hundred fifty issues.

== Notable contributors ==
- Chris Abani
- Kathy Acker
- Stan Allen
- Martin Amis
- John Ashbery
- Matthew Barney
- Roberto Bolaño
- Giannina Braschi
- Carlos Brillembourg
- S. D. Chrostowska
- Joshua Cohen
- Edwidge Danticat
- Arthur C. Danto
- Lydia Davis
- Willem Dafoe
- Junot Díaz
- Geoff Dyer
- Nicole Eisenman
- Jeffrey Eugenides
- Jonathan Franzen
- Sean Gill
- Robert Gober
- Francisco Goldman
- Felix Gonzalez-Torres
- Michael Greenberg
- Mary Heilmann
- Philip Seymour Hoffman
- A. M. Homes
- Gary Indiana
- Jim Jarmusch
- Barbara Kruger
- Rachel Kushner
- Olivia Laing
- Ben Lerner
- Roy Lichtenstein
- Sam Lipsyte
- Dimitris Lyacos
- Robert Mapplethorpe
- Ben Marcus
- Kerry James Marshall
- Allan McCollum
- Eileen Myles
- Al Pacino
- Adam Phillips
- Richard Prince
- Francine Prose
- Claudia Rankine
- Mika Rottenburg
- Salman Rushdie
- David Salle
- Richard Serra
- Cindy Sherman
- Anna Deavere Smith
- Patti Smith
- Quentin Tarantino
- Mickalene Thomas
- Colm Tóibín
- Ryan Trecartin
- Luc Tuymans
- Edmund White
- Caterina Verde

== Archive at Columbia University ==
In 2004, Columbia University's Rare Book and Manuscript Library acquired Bomb's archives, including twenty-four years' worth of audio recordings, raw and edited interview transcripts, manuscripts, galleys, and assorted ephemera.

== Oral History Project ==
Since 2014, Bomb's Oral History Project has staged one-on-one interviews with New York City-based visual artists of the African descent, conducted by curators, scholars, and cultural producers.

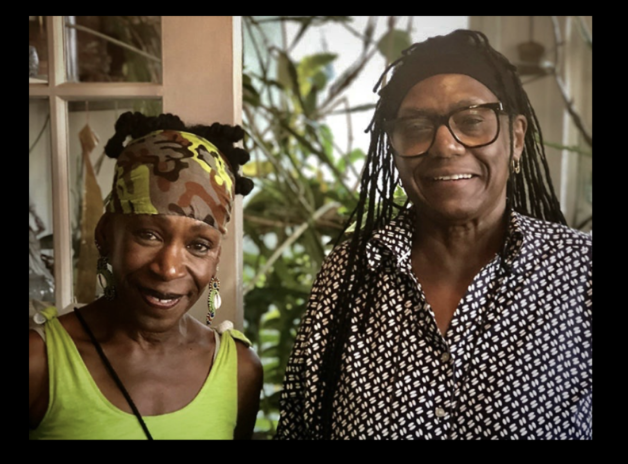
Artists Sana Musasama and Janet Olivia Henry for Bomb's 2019 installment of Oral History Project

The Oral History Project is dedicated to collecting, developing, and preserving the stories of distinguished visual artists of the African Diaspora. The Oral History Project has organized interviews including: Wangechi Mutu by Deborah Willis, Kara Walker & Larry Walker, Edward Clark by Jack Whitten, Adger Cowans by Carrie Mae Weems, Jeanne Moutoussamy-Ashe by Kalia Brooks, Melvin Edwards by Michael Brenson, Terry Adkins by Calvin Reid, Stanley Whitney by Alteronce Gumby, Gerald Jackson by Stanley Whitney, Eldzier Cortor by Terry Carbone, Peter Bradley by Steve Cannon, Quincy Troupe & Cannon Hersey, James Little by LeRonn P. Brooks, William T. Williams by Mona Hadler, Maren Hassinger by Lowery Stokes Sims, Linda Goode Bryant by Rujeko Hockley, Janet Olivia Henry and Sana Musasama by Stephanie E. Goodalle.

== See also ==
- List of literary magazines
- Small Press Flea
