= Anita Berrizbeitia =

American landscape architect

- Born: 1957 (age 68–69); Caracas, Venezuela
- Education: Simon Bolivar University; Wellesley College; Harvard University Graduate School of Design
- Occupations: Landscape Architect, Academic, Theorist
- Title: Chair of the Department of Landscape Architecture at the Harvard Graduate School of Design

Anita de la Rosa Berrizbeitia (born 1957) is a landscape theorist, teacher, and author. She continues to play an integral role in the renewed visibility of landscape architecture as a cultural practice. She is currently professor of landscape architecture at the Harvard Graduate School of Design and previous chair of the department of landscape architecture. Appointed in 2015, she served as the 14th chair of the oldest landscape architecture department in the world and only the second female to hold the position. Prior to coming to Harvard University she was the associate chair of landscape architecture at the University of Pennsylvania.

== Early life and education ==
Anita Berrizbeitia was born in Caracas, Venezuela. She attended the college of architecture and urbanism at Simon Bolivar University in Caracas, a public institution known for its science and technology orientation. In 1980, she received a B.A. from Wellesley College, and in 1987 earned an M.L.A. from the graduate school of design at Harvard University.

== Career ==
Berrizbeitia contributed to several award-winning projects while practicing as a landscape architect with Childs Associates, Inc., in Boston, from 1987 to 1993. Large-scale projects in which she participated include North Link Park in Battery Park City and D.W. Field Park in Brockton, Massachusetts. It is for her contributions to design theories of the modern and contemporary landscape, however, for which she is most recognized. Teaching has been an integral component to the development of her ideas, beginning with an assistant professorship of landscape architecture at Harvard (1993–98) and continuing as faculty at the University of Pennsylvania, which she joined in 1998 until 2010. In 2005, she was awarded the Rome Prize. Berrizbeitia currently is professor of landscape architecture at the Harvard Graduate School of Design and as of July 2015, chair of the department of landscape architecture. Prior to her appointment at Harvard she was associate department chair of landscape architecture and an associate professor at the University of Pennsylvania.

== Works ==
In 1999, with co-author Linda Pollak, Berrizbeitia published Inside/Outside: Between Architecture and Landscape. Organized as an anthology of twenty four design projects from seven countries, the book distinguished itself from other anthologies of the period by formulating a theory of relationships around the concept of design operations, such as reciprocity and insertion, rather than a formal description of design elements. The book was widely praised and is firmly situated in design libraries and on the reading lists of advanced courses in design studies. Berrizbeitia followed with Roberto Burle Marx in Caracas: Parque del Este, 1956-1961 (2004), which was awarded the J.B. Jackson Book Prize in 2007 from the Foundation for Landscape Studies, a prize that recognizes significant contributions to garden history and landscape studies. The book furthers her studies in inter-relationships by examining the Latin American Modernist context of Burle Marx that is noteworthy for its embrace of hybridity. Her study reveals several forms of hybridity including Formal (combining types), Ecological (native/non-native)and Methodological (process/form) in Burle Marx's Parque del Este that hold particular relevance to contemporary practice in North America. In addition to her two books, Berrizbeitia has also contributed essays to numerous studies in modern and contemporary design including Daniel Urban Kiley: The Early Gardens, Recovering Landscape: Essays in Contemporary Landscape Architecture, Roberto Burle Marx: Landscapes Reflected, CASE:Downsview Park Toronto, and Large Parks.

In 2005, Berrizbeitia was awarded the Rome Prize in Landscape Architecture to study “The Ecology of Formal Systems in the Italian Landscape and Garden.” Most recently, she is the editor of Michael Van Valkenburgh Associates: Reconstructing Urban Landscapes. and of Urban Landscapes. from the series Critical Concepts in Built Environment.

She is currently overseeing a three-year partnership between Maja Hoffman's LUMA Foundation in Arles, France and the Harvard University Graduate School of Design, with studios and seminars addressing various urban or territorial challenges facing Arles and its surrounding region. In 2020, together with Gunther Vogt, Berrizbeitia co-curated "First the Forests," a GSD exhibit which documented six projects in the manner of a Wunderkammer.

== Selected published work ==
- Berrizbeitia, Anita. Roberto Burle Marx in Caracas: Parque Del Este, 1956-1961. Penn Studies in Landscape Architecture. Philadelphia: University of Pennsylvania Press, 2005. ISBN 9780812238044
- Berrizbeitia, Anita, and Linda. Pollak. Inside outside: Between Architecture and Landscape. Gloucester, Mass.: London: Rockport; Hi Marketing, 1999. ISBN 9781592530137
- Berrizbeitia, Anita, Felipe. Correa, Rafi. Segal, Carlos. Garciavelez Alfaro, Mariusz. Klemens, and Harvard University. Graduate School of Design. QNS: Elements of Urban Design 2010: Queens. Cambridge, MA: Harvard University, the Graduate School of Design, 2013.
- Berrizbeitia, Anita. "Between Deep and Ephemeral Time: Representations of Geology and Temporality in Charles Eliot's Metropolitan Park System, Boston (1892-1893)." Studies in the History of Gardens & Designed Landscapes 34, no. 1 (2014): 38–51.
- Berrizbeitia, Anita. Urban Landscape. Critical Concepts in Built Environment. London; New York: Routledge, 2015. ISBN 9780415707008
- Berrizbeitia, Anita, "Scales of Undecidability." Czerniak, Julia. CASE: Downsview Park Toronto. CASE Series (Prestel Verlag). Munich; New York: Cambridge, Mass.: Prestel; Harvard University, Graduate School of Design, 2001, 116–125.

== Personal life ==
She lives in Massachusetts with her husband and three sons.

== See also ==
- List of Venezuelan Americans
