= Cristina Abuhazi =

Venezuelan TV host, model, and actress (born 1980)

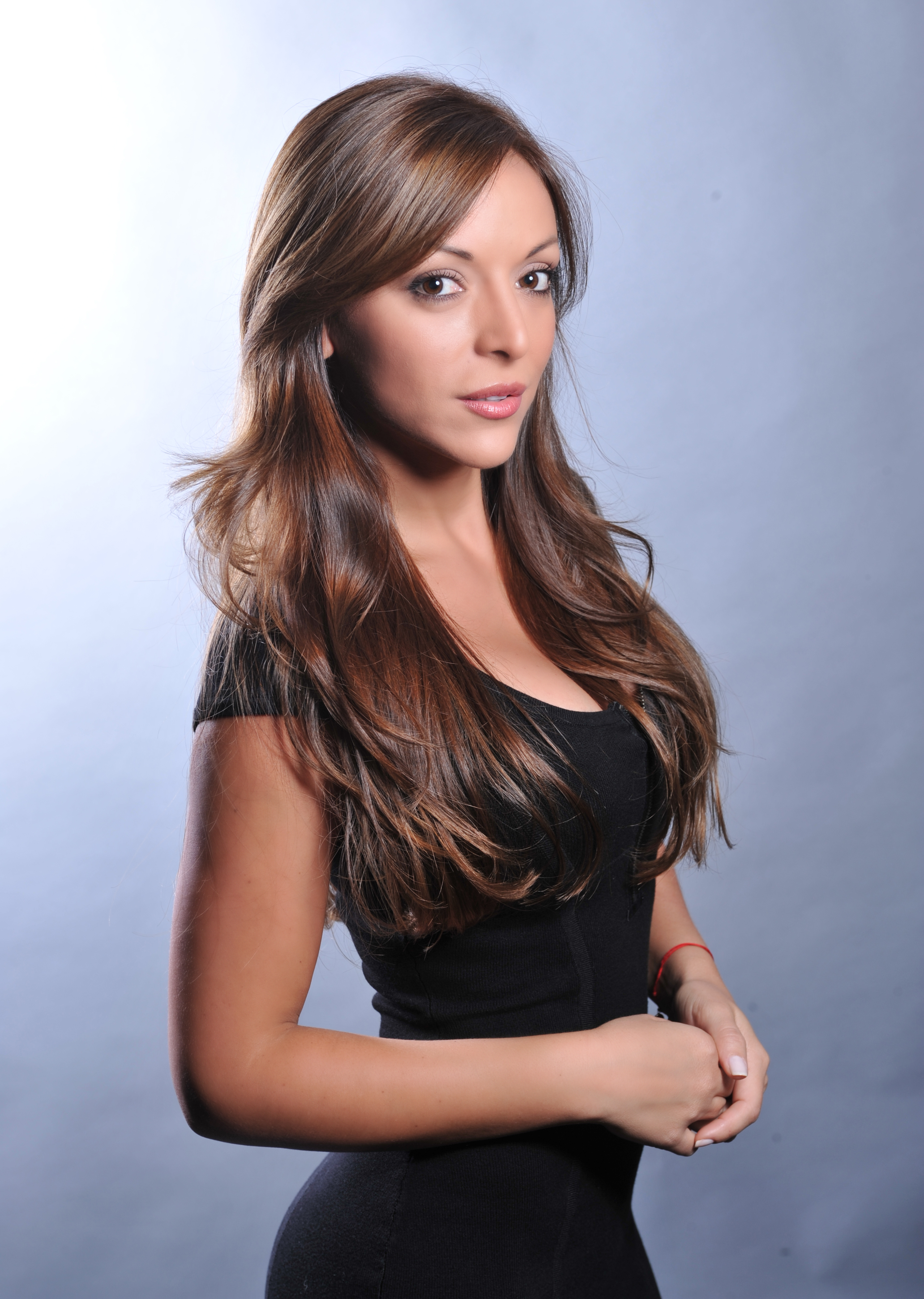
- Cristina Abuhazi in Miami
- Born: Cristina Abuhazi Garcia; December 4, 1980 (age 45); Caracas, Venezuela
- Occupations: TV hostess, actress, television personality and presenter
- Spouse: Daniel Martinez Fumoleau
- Website: www.cristinaabuhazi.com

Cristina Abuhazi Garcia (born 4 December 1980) is a Venezuelan television host, model, and actress. She is currently working on a variety of TV Shows in Sony Youtube America Latina Network in the United States.

She also appears in Show Business Extra by MTV3 Tr3s (United States) and Meridiano Televisión (Venezuela).

Abuhazi has appeared in several soap operas and hosted a number of programs on Venezuelan television.

== Filmography ==
=== TV show host ===
- Sony Entertainment Television (Latin America), (2013)
- Show Business Extra, MTV3 Tr3s (2013)
- 99 TV (2012)
- Un momento Diferente, Canal i (2009-2010)
- Pura Vida Nocturna, featuring Arturo de los Ríos, Canal de Noticias (2008)

=== TV series ===
- Corazón Valiente, Telemundo (2012-2013)
- Una Maid en Manhattan, Telemundo (2011-2012)
- Mi Prima Ciela, RCTV (2007)
- Te tengo en Salsa, RCTV (2007)

=== Radio ===
- Fusible fm - Radio 100.7 FM Ateneo de Caracas (2006-2007)

== Personal life ==
Abuhazi is a lawyer graduated in 2003 in the Facultad de Derecho of Universidad Santa María (Caracas) Venezuela.

She is a marathon runner. Cristina has run the New York City Marathon two times, once in 2007 and 2008 as well as five half marathons in her hometown of Miami.

Cristina is involved in the fight against breast cancer participating in the Asociación Civil sin fines de lucro SenosAyuda and the McHappy Day with the McDonald's Venezuela Foundation, finding a cure for infantile paralysis (Poliomyelitis) in an annual event, where a percentage of the day's sales go to charity. It is the signature fundraising event for Ronald McDonald House Charities.
