= Evelyn Miralles =

NASA VR Engineer

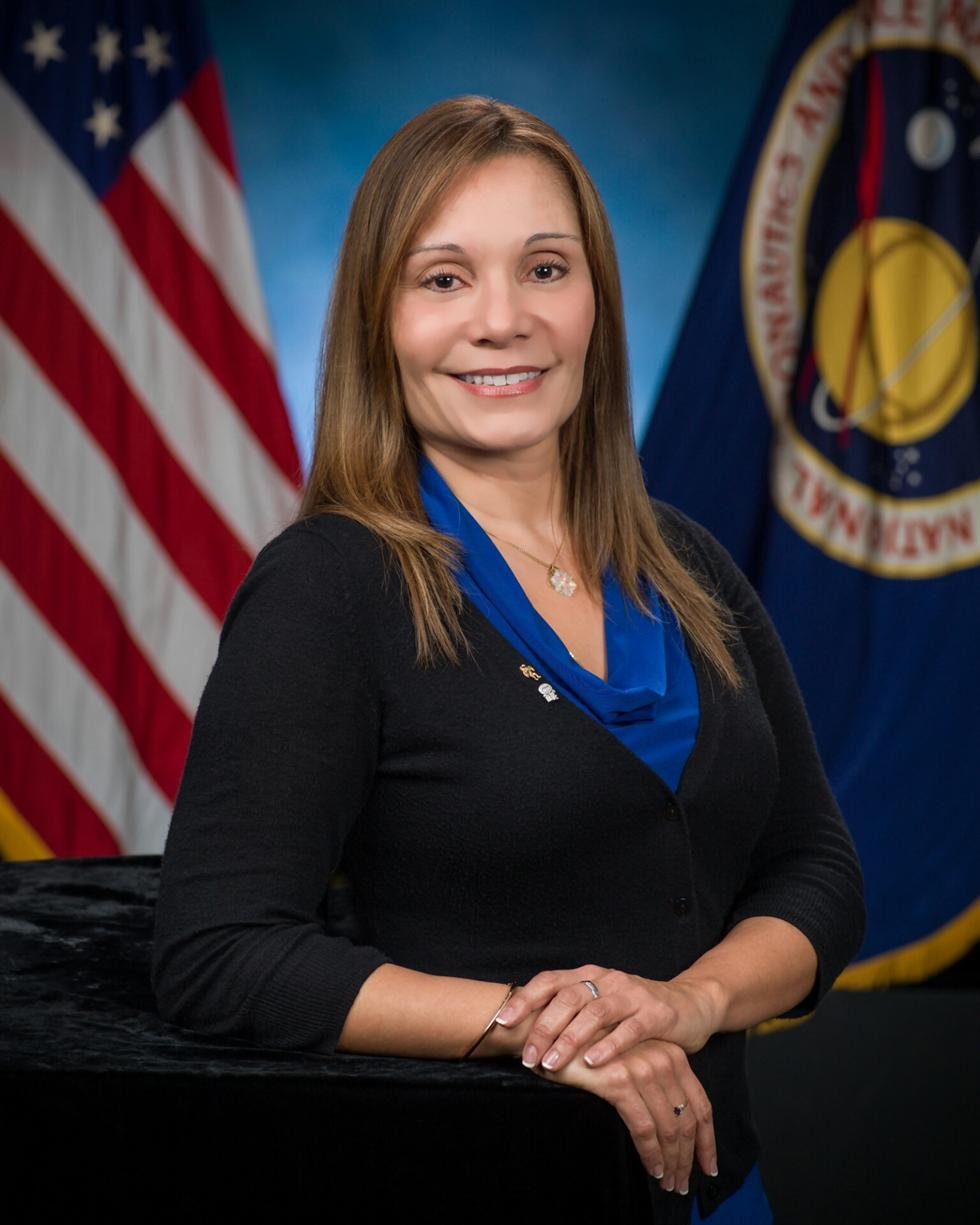
- Born: February 19, 1966 (age 60); Caracas, Venezuela
- Education: University of Houston–Clear Lake (MBA) (BA); Lamar University (BS); Andrés Bello Catholic University (AA)
- Occupations: Associate Vice president University of Houston–Clear Lake, software engineer

Evelyn Rodriguez Miralles (born 19 February 1966) is a Venezuelan-American engineer that served as the chief principal engineer with CACI International at NASA Johnson Space Center Houston Texas. Her work at the virtual reality laboratory at NASA furthered human spaceflight by training United States astronauts to perform spacewalks and working outside a spacecraft in micro-gravity. Miralles is currently the Associate vice president for Strategic Information Initiatives and Technology at the University of Houston–Clear Lake.

== Career ==
When Miralles was young she wanted to be an architect "to build something" in space, and at the University of Houston–Clear Lake she learned computer science and how to code algorithms for computer graphics. In 1990, she graduated from the Lamar University with a BS in Computer Graphics, and in 1992 from University of Houston–Clear Lake with a BA in CIS. She worked at NASA Johnson Space Center's VRLAB for twenty years in Houston (Texas).

Since 1992, Miralles supported the Space Shuttle and International Space Station missions. Her first project was building a 3D model of a Habitat for the Moon project. It was not feasible but could possibly be used in the future for a mission to Mars. Miralles was the co-author of the state-of-the-art Dynamic Onboard Ubiquitous Graphics (DOUG) flight software, which has been used since 2000 to train astronauts using virtual reality technology. She was part of the team for STS 61 mission, which repaired the Hubble Space Telescope in 1993, and for all Space Shuttle and ISS missions after.

Miralles is involved with science outreach. She keynoted the Hispanic science conference "Hispanicize 2017".

== Awards ==
- One of BBC 100 Inspirational Women in the World BBC 100 Women - 2016
- University of Houston–Clear Lake - Distinguish Alumna Award - 2016
- CNET in Spanish Top 20 most influential Hispanics in the US - 2016
- NASA Space Flight Safety Award "Silver Snoopy Award" - 2012
