= Nelson Bustamante =

Chilean footballer (born 1992)

Personal information
- Full name: Nelson Maximiliano Bustamante Lorca
- Date of birth: 23 December 1992 (age 33)
- Place of birth: San Bernardo, Santiago, Chile
- Height: 1.60 m (5 ft 3 in)
- Positions: Second striker; attacking midfielder

Youth career
- 2007: Universidad Católica
- 2007–2011: Brescia
- 2011–2012: Bologna

Senior career*
Years	Team	Apps	(Gls)
2012–2013	Lecce	4	(0)
2014–2015	Matera	2	(0)
2016	Verbania	11	(0)
2016–2017	Virtus Bolzano	15	(1)
2017	Santiago Morning	10	(2)
2018	Barnechea	5	(0)
2024	Glorias Navales		
Total		47	(3)
- * Club domestic league appearances and goals

Nelson Maximiliano Bustamante Lorca (born 23 December 1992) is a Chilean former footballer who played as a forward.

== Early life ==
Bustamante was born in San Bernardo, Chile, and developed a passion for football from his father, who played for a local team. As a child, he would tell his father that he was going to mow lawns for money, but would instead go to dribble a football on the local streets, earning money from passers-by. In 2007, while performing on a street corner, he was spotted by Chilean investigative news show Contacto, run by Canal 13, and following the report, he was taken on by a group of businessmen, including agent René Curiaz and former footballer Frank Lobos.

== Club career ==
=== Early career ===
Curiaz and Lobos offered him to top-flight Chilean sides Colo-Colo and Universidad Católica, and he spent some time with the latter, but as they were unable to provide growth hormone treatment for his growth hormone deficiency, the same condition that afflicted his idol, Lionel Messi, he opted to move to Italy, joining the academy of Brescia. In 2011, he was released by Brescia, who deemed his short stature not an appropriate height to progress as a professional footballer, and he joined Bologna, though he only spent six months with the club before again being released.

=== Lecce ===
In October 2012, he joined Lega Pro Primera Divisione side Lecce, with the club's managing director, Antonio Tesoro, stating that he was a "great talent", comparing him to Argentine player Maximiliano Moralez. He made his professional debut shortly after joining, playing in Lecce's 1–0 Coppa Italia Lega Pro win over Nocerina on 18 October. The following month, he scored his first goal for the club in Lecce's 5–1 Coppa Italia Lega Pro win against Aprilia.

=== Matera and Serie D ===
By May 2013, Bustamante found himself training separately from the Lecce first team. He was released by the club, and went on to join fellow Lega Pro side Matera the following summer. In December 2015, having been released by Matera, he returned to his native Chile, with the hope of finding a club to join. However, he returned to Italy in August of the following year, having failed to join a club in Chile, and joined Serie D side Verbania. Four months later, in December 2016, he moved to fellow Serie D side Virtus Bolzano.

=== Return to Chile ===
In July 2017, after fifteen league appearances and one goal with Virtus Bolzano, Bustamante returned to Chile, signing with Primera B de Chile side Santiago Morning. He scored his first goal for the club on 7 August of the same year, the only goal in a 1–0 win against Unión La Calera. The following season he moved to fellow Primera B side Barnechea. At the conclusion of the 2018 season, Bustamante decided to retire from football and spend time playing football for his neighbourhood's teams.

He briefly came out of retirement in 2024, joining amateur side Glorias Navales, and featured in their 2–0 loss to former club Universidad Católica in the Copa Chile.

== Style of play ==
During his playing career, Bustamante was nicknamed the "Chilean Messi" after Argentine footballing legend Lionel Messi, due to the two sharing a similar stature.

== Career statistics ==
=== Club ===
Appearances and goals by club, season and competition
Club	Season	League			Cup		Other		Total	
Club	Season	Division	Apps	Goals	Apps	Goals	Apps	Goals	Apps	Goals
Lecce	2012–13	Lega Pro Prima Divisione	4	0	0	0	2 (Note: Appearances in the Coppa Italia Lega Pro)	1	6	1
Matera	2014–15	Lega Pro	2	0	0	0	0	0	2	0
Verbania	2016–17	Serie D	11	0	0	0	0	0	11	0
Virtus Bolzano	2016–17	Serie D	15	1	0	0	0	0	15	1
Santiago Morning	2017	Primera B de Chile	10	2	2 (Note: Appearances in the Copa Chile)	0	0	0	12	2
Barnechea	2018	Primera B de Chile	5	0	0	0	0	0	5	0
Career total			47	3	2	0	2	1	51	4
