= Mayly Sánchez =

Venezuelan scientist

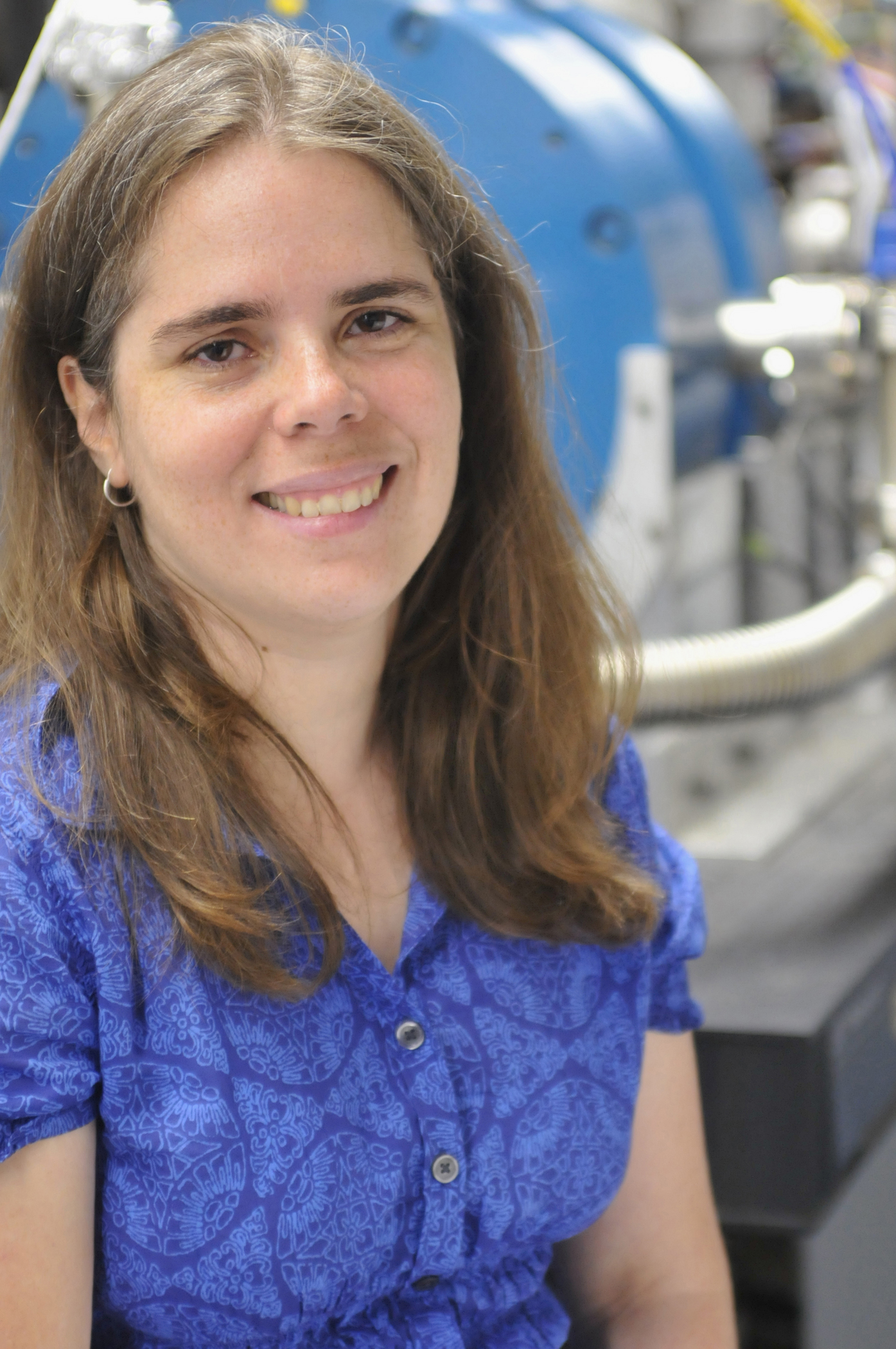
- Born: Mayly Carolina Sánchez; June 26, 1972 (age 54); Caracas, Venezuela
- Education: Universidad de Los Andes, ULA; International Centre for Theoretical Physics; Tufts University
- Occupations: Researcher, academic
- Years active: 2003-
- Employer: Florida State University
- Known for: Experimental work with neutrinos

Mayly Sánchez is a Venezuelan-born particle physicist who researches and teaches at Florida State University. In 2011, she was awarded the Presidential Early Career Awards for Scientists and Engineers (PECASE), the highest honor given by the United States to scientists who are in the early stages of their research careers, for her contributions to the study of neutrinos and her work in promoting STEM fields to women. In 2013, she was named by the BBC as one of the top ten women scientists in Latin America.

== Early life ==
Sánchez was born in Caracas, Venezuela on June 26, 1972. Her interest and passion for science began at an early age, after watching the 1980 television series "Cosmos". Due to this, she became passionate about astronomy and even asked for books about astronomy for her 12th birthday. As a result of this interest, her uncle told her that if she wanted to know more about astronomy, she would need to also study physics.

At the age of 13, she relocated with her family to Mérida, Venezuela. Here, she attended high school at the Colegio Fátima, an all-girls Catholic school. While in high school, her focus eventually shifted from astronomy to physics, thanks to the help of her mathematics and physics teachers.

== Education ==
After graduating high school, Sánchez went on to study at Universidad de Los Andes, ULA in Mérida where she earned her BS in physics in 1995. Here is where her interest shifted from astronomy and physics towards a more concentrated focus on fundamental physics. Following this, she won a scholarship for postgraduate work at the International Centre for Theoretical Physics in Trieste, Italy where she earned her diploma in high energy physics in 1996.

Following the completion of her one-year program, she moved to the Boston, Massachusetts to complete a Masters of Science degree at Tufts University. In 1998, she earned an MSc in Physics and then completed her PhD in physics in 2003. It was during this time that her passion once again narrowed down, this time her focus being on neutrinos. Her doctoral dissertation was titled “Oscillation Analysis of Atmospheric Neutrinos in Soudan 2”.

== Career ==
After graduation, Sánchez worked as postdoctoral researcher at Harvard University, where she continued working in experimental physics on fundamental particles, particularly neutrinos. During this time she also joined the Main Injector Neutrino Oscillation Search (MINOS) team at Fermilab. In 2007 she was hired as assistant physicist at the US Energy Department's Argonne National Laboratory, where she continues to work today. In 2009 she also joined the faculty of Iowa State University, where she is now a Professor of Physics and Astronomy and Cassling Family Professor, earning tenure in 2013. She is also an adviser and mentor to many female students, leading the Iowa State University Undergraduate Women in Physics group and Conference for Undergraduate Women in Physics.

Her research is part of the Long Baseline Neutrino Experiment (DUNE), which is planned to send an intense beam of neutrinos from the Fermi National Accelerator Laboratory in Batavia, Illinois to a detector located at the Homestake Mine in South Dakota. The experiment is designed to help scientists understand how the universe formed and why neutrinos change form, especially when they pass through rock. Sánchez is also working on the Main Injector Neutrino Oscillation Search and NOνA experiments designed to study neutrino oscillations sent from Fermilab detectors in northern Minnesota, and she is a spokesperson of the Accelerator Neutrino Neutron Interaction Experiment (ANNIE) at Fermilab. In 2012, the White House announced that Sánchez was one of the 2011 PECASE Award winners, which is the highest award granted by the United States to young scientists beginning their careers. In 2013, she was named by the BBC as one of the top ten women scientists in Latin America.

Her current work also includes the development of the next generation of the photodetectors, which are used in the detection of neutrinos but can also be used in medical imaging and other applications. This work is to make detectors less expensive and more effective.

In 2026, Sánchez was chosen to be a member of the Department of Energy's Office of Science Advisory Committee.

== Awards and recognition ==
- 2020 Fellow of the American Physical Society
- 2016 Fermi National Laboratory Intensity Frontier Fellowship
- 2013 BBC's Top 10 Latina Scientists
- 2012 Presidential Early Career Award for Scientists and Engineers (PECASE)
- 2012 Official Recognition from the Office of the Governor of the State of Iowa.
- 2012 Iowa State University Award for Early Achievement in Research.
- 2011 National Science Foundation CAREER Award.
- 2009 Hispanic Engineer National Achievement Award Corporation (HENAAC) Outstanding Technical Achievement Award.

== Select publications ==
- First measurement of electron neutrino appearance in NOvA, NOvA Collaboration (with P. Adamson et al.), Phys. Rev. Lett. 116, 151806 (2016).
- First measurement of muon neutrino disappearance in NOvA, NOvA Collaboration (with P. Adamson et al.), Phys. Rev. D. 93, 051104 (R) (2016).
- Combined Analysis of νμ Disappearance and νμ-> νe Appearance in MINOS using Accelerator and Atmospheric Neutrinos, Minos Collaboration (with P. Adamson et al.), Phys. Rev. Lett. 112, 191801 (2014).
- Electron Neutrino and Anti-Neutrino Appearance in the Full MINOS data sample, Minos Collaboration (with P. Adamson et al.), accepted by Phys. Rev. Lett (2013).
- Improved Measurement of Muon Antineutrino Disappearance in MINOS, Minos Collaboration (with P. Adamson et al.), Phys. Rev. Lett. 108, 191801 (2012).
- Improved Search for Muon-neutrino to Electron-neutrino Oscillations in MINOS, Minos Collaboration (with P. Adamson et al.), Phys. Rev. Lett. 107, 181802 (2011).
- Measurement of the Neutrino Mass Splitting and Flavor Mixing by MINOS, Minos Collaboration (with P. Adamson et al.), Phys. Rev. Lett. 106, 181801 (2011).
- Search for Muon-neutrino to Electron-neutrino Transitions in MINOS, Minos Collaboration (with P. Adamson et al.) Phys. Rev. Lett. 103, 261802 (2009).
- Observation of Muon Neutrino Disappearance with the MINOS Detectors and the NuMI Neutrino Beam, Minos Collaboration (with D.G. Michael et al.) Phys. Rev. Lett. 97, 191801 (2006).
- Observation of Atmospheric Neutrino Oscillations in Soudan 2, Soudan 2 Collaboration (M. Sanchez et al.) Phys. Rev. D 68, 113004 (2003).
- The Atmospheric Neutrino Flavor Ratio from a 3.9 Fiducial Kiloton-Year Exposure of Soudan 2, Soudan-2 Collaboration (with W.W.M. Allison et al.) Phys. Lett. B449: 137–144, (1999).
