= Nina Fuentes =

Venezuelan art collector, curator, philanthropist, business woman and art dealer

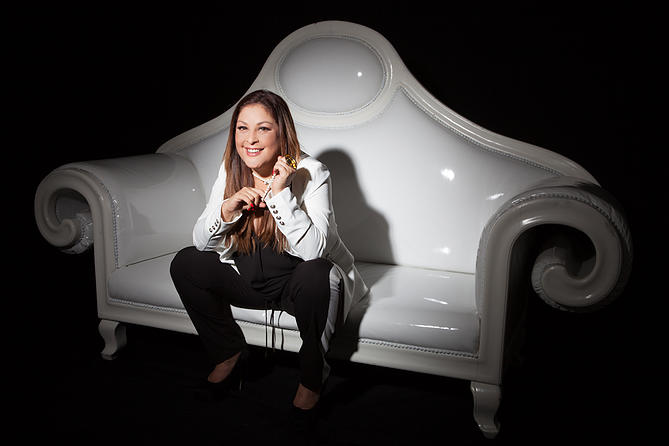
- Nina Fuentes Collector
- Born: Andreina Mercedes del Carmen Fuentes Angarita; April 5, 1968 (age 58); Caracas, Venezuela,
- Occupations: collector, curator, philanthropist, museologist, business woman and art dealer
- Years active: 1985–present

Nina Fuentes, a.k.a. Nina Dotti (born Andreina Mercedes del Carmen Fuentes Angarita, April 5, 1968, in Caracas, Venezuela) is a Venezuelan art collector, curator, philanthropist, business woman and art dealer living in Miami, Florida.

== Early life ==
Fuentes's family moved to California when she was just 30 days old, and she lived in the state until she was six years old. Fuentes then returned to Caracas, Venezuela, where she graduated from Universidad Metropolitana with a bachelor's degree in Banking and Finance in 1991. She then studied Law, Museology and Art History, earning her bachelor's degree in Arts in 2003 from Universidad José María Vargas.

At a very young age she discovered the power of art to promote causes at the primal core of her principles. During her formative years she realized that although she couldn't struggle against all the social ills that troubled her she could focus her attention and efforts on contributing to those issues she could positively impact.

== Artist and Education Activist ==
Fuentes's art work is supported by the versatile use of diverse materials, applied in installations, sculpture, photography, and video. Her work is neo-conceptual, nurtured by a Duchampian influence and pop sub realistic aesthetic, and her message is highly critic, intimate and personal.

Since the beginning of her career, Fuentes explored common social and political issues like religion, the role of women in society, prostitution, violence and discrimination, especially to LGBT and women. Also, she builds on concepts of femicide as a clear demonstration of power and patriarchal control over women's lives, freedom, dignity and sexuality.

In her country, Fuentes uses active protest channels with irony and a sense of humor. Her relationship with Venezuela has become more complex, as she questions its current state socially and politically.

Fuentes has held solo and group exhibitions in France, China, Venezuela, Colombia, Panama, Germany, USA (Miami, LA, and New York), UK, Switzerland, Argentina, and many other countries around the world.

== Art and Humanitarianism ==
Nina Fuentes's work asks her audience to reconsider current social realities. Themes include the rights of same sex couples to adopt children, and the impact of patriarchal concepts of femininity on women's fashions and roles in the home.

In 1996, Fuentes was involved in the creation of the "Fundación Arte Emergente" or FAE (Foundation of Emerging Arts) to promote new Venezuelan contemporary artists around the world.

In 2000, Fuentes began campaigning to promote adoption in Venezuela, sponsoring "El Libro de Vida" project, which has helped integrate children with their adoptive families. For more than 10 years, the project has been successful through partnerships with FUNDANA, the Fundación Pro Adopción and Fundación Mi Familia.

After moving to Miami in 2006, Fuentes created Arts Connection to continue supporting the arts, as well as emerging artists.

== The Chill Concept ==
In 2004, the Art Districts in Miami published Fuentes's work, The Chill Concept at Hardcore: A Contemporary Evolution, continuing her contribution to the Museum of Sciences.

The Chill Concept (TCC) is Fuentes' conception of a new kind of museum. TCC provides guidance on a large body of research on wellness, innovation and contemporary culture factors that promote learning and experimentation. The focus is building a community with a "strong positive learning environment by mitigating the big learning inhibitors: fear, ego, defenses, complacency, and arrogance" (Edward D. Hess, Learn to Die, Columbia University Press, 2014).

== Career ==
=== Museologist ===
On Education for Community Engagement and Creative Thinking Fuentes's expertise represents a way to community engagement primarily as a tool of education. Fuentes worked in the Museo Jacobo Borges, Caracas, Vzla. First in the educational department.

In 1998, Fuentes started her career as an exhibition coordinator for the Museo Jacobo Borges in Catia, Venezuela. Since then, she has done many community services in the Caracas Museum of Science , focusing on social issues.

Her first contribution was the essay "Exhibición - Acción: Arte y Comunidades," which was a collaboration with Venezuelan Anthropologist, Luis Galindo, in 2001. The essay was presented at the Museo Jacobo Borges and Museo de Ciencias Naturales in Catia and Caracas, Venezuela.

In 2004, she founded the "Asociación de Museólogos de Venezuela" I Museologist Conference.

Meanwhile, Fuentes worked for many years in her theory. In 2005, she began working with Luis Galindo and evolved with the collaboration of well-known curator, Gerardo Zavarce. Their work was published in Mendoza, Argentina, "Exhibición - Acción: Arte y Comunidades," as part of the “Primer Foro de Arte Emergente: ‘Estéticas Latinoamericanas’."

In 2013, Fuentes and Gerando were published after their presentation of Exhibition - Action: Art and Museum at the NODEM Conference in Stockholm, Sweden as part of the conference and by Common Ground in their publication: The Journal of the Inclusive Museum in New York.

Most recently, and after 17+ years in the arts, Fuentes inaugurated the first Pop Up Museum (Project Museum) in Miami, The Chill Concept.

=== Art dealer ===
Fuentes started her career as an art dealer in 2005 when she founded the Hardcore Art Contemporary Space in Wynwood Art District in Miami, FL. Since then, she has produced many shows, represented many artists and participated in many of the most important art fairs in the world.

In 2010, she organized and founded the board of incorporation of the Miami Art Dealer Association (MADA), where she participated until 2014 as a board member.

Fuentes founded PSH in 2013, which is a joint venture to promote the Contemporary Arts throughout Latin America, in an association with dealers from Colombia and Bolivia, participating in seven fares around the world that year alone.

Early September 2014, Fuentes officially opened The Chill Concept in the Wynwood Art District of Miami, FL.

=== Art collector ===
Fuentes began her art collector career in 1996 when she acquired her first piece, by Francisco Narvaez, which would become the inception of her Contemporary Art Collection. Her inspiration and purpose to collect was to invest and donate important contemporary feminist art pieces to museums around the world. She shared pieces to museums all over the United States and the world, from Miami to New York City and beyond. In 2007, Fuentes joined the Independent Collectors group of Berlin.

=== Curator ===
Fuentes's first work as a curator was in the exhibition called "Tribute to Miss Venezuela Pageant" inside the exhibit "609060," design by the Goethe Institut of Caracas, and shown at the Museo Jacobo Borges, Catia (Caracas) in 2000.

For a decade, she managed the curatorial program at Hardcore Art Contemporary Space, and Fuentes has participated in numerous Contemporary Art Fairs: Art Miami, Arte Americas Miami, SCOPE Art Show New York, Miami, and Basel, Context Miami, Bridge London, Pinta Art Fair London, and New York, Art Shanghai, LINK Hong Kong, Platform LA, FIA Caracas, among many others.

As part of her career as a curator, one of the most important challenges Fuentes faced was implementing the new methodology "Exhibición - Acción: Arte y Comunidades" in the exhibitions Album de Boda (2005) and Tránsito (2006).

== Exhibition ==
- "The Chill Concept: The Museum Evolution", The Chill Concept, Sept 13, 2014, Miami, FL (Co-Curator and Producer)
- "The Future is Bright, the Past is Black and White", Blue & Joy, March 13, 2014, The Chill Concept @ Hardcore Art Contemporary Space, Miami, FL (Curator and Producer)
- CONTEXT BLUE & JOY
- "Art and Toys", Chanoir, Consuelo Castaneda, Fuentes Dotti, Carlos Zerpa, Muu Banco, FLIX, Benito Laren and Blue & Joy. PSH Projects, Oct, 2013, Miami, FL. (Curator and Producer)
- "Breaking News", David Palacios. PSH Projects, Oct, 2013, Miami, FL (Curator and Producer)
- "Storage Memoir" 10 years history. Consuelo Castañeda, Andres Michelena, Guerra De La Paz, Amparo Sard, Manuela Covini, Milton Becerra, Gaston Ugalde, Chanoir, Julie Frield, Gladys Triana, Mariano Vargas, Fernando Arias, among others. Sept., 2013, The Chill Concept @ Hardcore Art Contemporary Space, Miami, FL (Curator)
- "No Hard Feelings" Chanoir. March 30, 2013, The Chill Concept @ Hardcore Art Contemporary Space, Miami, FL (Co-Curator and Producer)
- "Recycle" Consuelo Castaneda. Nov., 2012 - April, 2013, The Chill Concept @ Hardcore Art Contemporary Space, Miami, FL.

== Awards ==
- EUREKA UNIVERSIA 2001, Award for Social Innovation, "Ley de Museos e instituciones Afines". Universidad Jose Maria Vargas. EUREKA -Carlos Cruz Diez, 2003. Recognition for organizing the 1st Great Encounter with Adoption.
- FUNDANA - 2004 Public recognition in the Gay Pride march in Caracas, Venezuela, for the realization of the exhibit curator: "ALBUM DE BODA" in CELARG
- PROCLAMATION NINA FUENTES DAY 2015
