= Strategic Investment Group =

American investment manager

- Type: Private
- Industry: Financial services
- Founded: 1987
- Headquarters: Arlington, Virginia
- AUM: US$ 38 billion
- Website: https://www.strategicgroup.com

Strategic Investment Group (also known as Strategic Investment Partners, Inc. or SIP) is an American investment manager with approximately US$ 38 billion of assets under management. The company is credited for pioneering the fund of funds investment strategy. SIP was founded in 1987 by six executives from the pension investment group of the World Bank.
