= Venezuelan Americans =

Americans of Venezuelan birth or descent

Venezuelan Americans venezolano-estadounidenses

Total population
- 1,168,271 (2024); 0.34% of total population (2024)

Regions with significant populations
- Florida (Miami, Tampa, Orlando, Jacksonville); Georgia (Atlanta); Chicago; Milwaukee; New York City; Boston; Philadelphia; Washington, D.C.; Minneapolis; Texas (Houston, Dallas); California (Los Angeles, San Francisco); Seattle; Denver; Salt Lake City

Languages
- English; Venezuelan Spanish; Spanglish

Religion
- Major Roman Catholicism; Irreligion; Atheism; Protestantism; Judaism; Mormonism

Venezuelan Americans (Spanish: venezolano-estadounidenses, venezolano-americanos, or estadounidenses de origen venezolano) are Americans who trace their heritage, or part of their heritage, to the nation of Venezuela. The word may refer to someone born in the U.S. of Venezuelan descent or to someone who has immigrated to the U.S. from Venezuela.

Venezuelan Americans are one of many Latin American groups in the United States. Venezuela's diverse culture includes influences from Spanish, Portuguese, Italians, Germans, Dutch and the French, along with influences from African and Indigenous elements.

Venezuelan Spanish is the group's spoken form of the Spanish language.

In the United States, Venezuelans are on top of the list of nationalities requesting asylum.

== History ==
Until the 20th century, the number of Venezuelans that immigrated to the United States is unknown because they were included in the "Other" category. During the eighteenth and nineteenth centuries, there were many European migrants who went originally to Venezuela, but later moved to the United States with their children and grandchildren who were born and/or grew up in Venezuela speaking Spanish. From 1910 to 1930, it is estimated that over 4,000 South Americans each year migrated to the United States. However, there are not many specific figures that indicate the number of Venezuelans among the 4,000.

Many Venezuelans settled in the United States with hopes of receiving a better education, only to remain there following graduation. Many Venezuelans who have relatives living in the United States also immigrated to this country. However, since the 1980s, the reasons for Venezuelan immigration have changed to include hopes of earning a better salary. In the 1990s and continuing up to the present, many Venezuelans opposing the regime of presidents Hugo Chavez and Nicolás Maduro have migrated to the United States (mostly to Florida, but Texas and Utah are other destinations).

Due to economic turmoil and crime in Venezuela, there is an ongoing migration wave to the United States and its neighboring countries. and currently as of the early 2020s, Venezuelans make up the majority of undocumented immigrants coming into the country, many going to cities such as New York, Chicago, Denver and Washington, D.C.

== Demographics ==
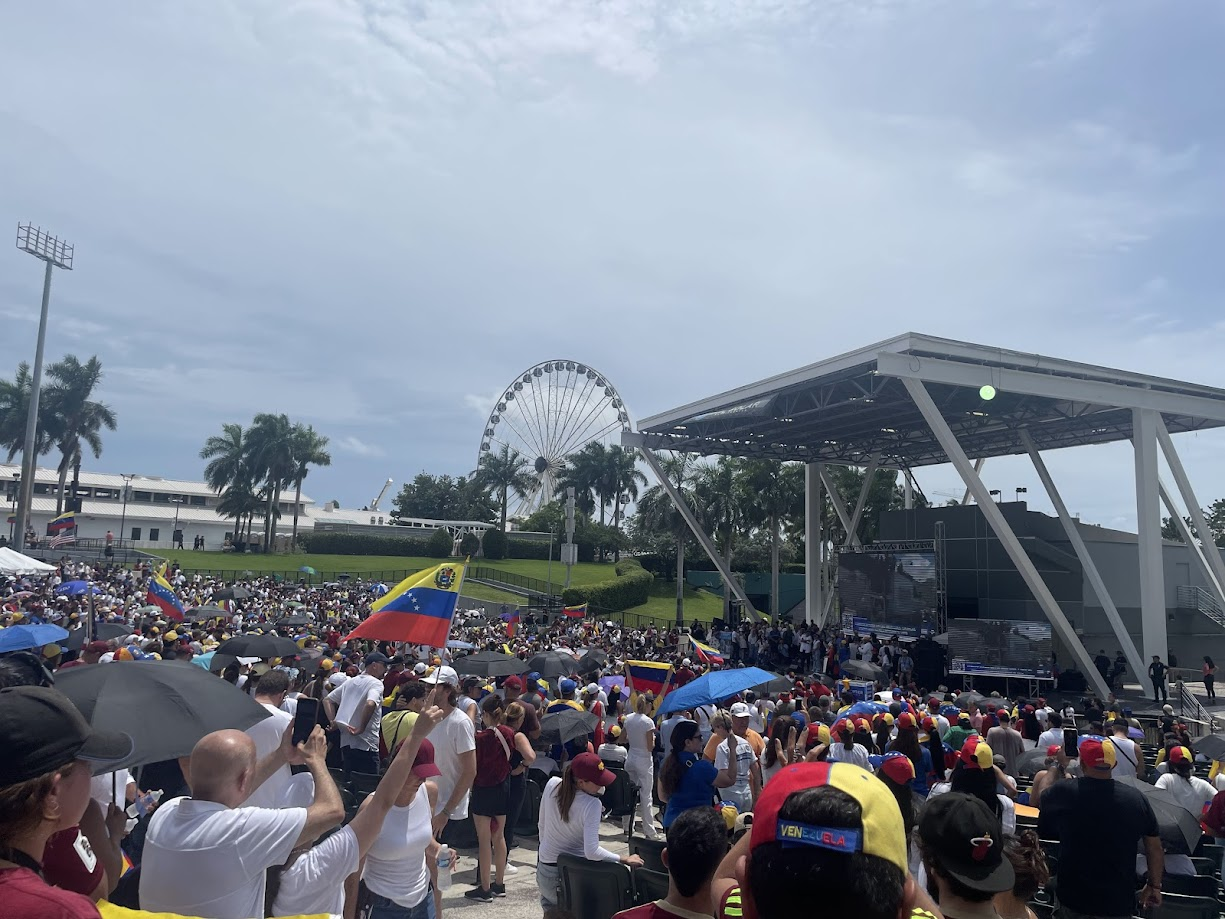
A public assembly of Venezuelans at Bayfront Park's FPL Solar Amphitheater, in Miami, Florida.

The largest concentration of Venezuelans in the United States is in South Florida, especially the Miami suburbs of Doral and Weston. Other main states with Venezuelan American populations are, according to the 2010 census, followed by Texas second, New York, California, New Jersey, Georgia and Virginia. Urban areas with a large Venezuelan community include Miami, Houston, New York City, Los Angeles, Salt Lake City and Washington, D.C.

=== States ===
State	Venezuelan Population (2022 ACS)	Percent
Alabama	1,759	0.0%
Alaska	309	0.0%
Arizona	4,625	0.1%
Arkansas	2,214	0.1%
California	29,345	0.1%
Colorado	9,587	0.2%
Connecticut	7,651	0.2%
Delaware	139	0.0%
District of Columbia	1,808	0.3%
Florida	380,972	1.7%
(Georgia (U.S. state)) Georgia	33,227	0.3%
Hawaii	1,750	0.1%
Idaho	2,999	0.2%
Illinois	16,730	0.1%
Indiana	7,673	0.1%
Iowa	582	0.0%
Kansas	2,854	0.1%
Kentucky	2,245	0.1%
Louisiana	1,991	0.0%
Maine	345	0.0%
Maryland	7,891	0.1%
Massachusetts	7,266	0.1%
Michigan	3,705	0.0%
Minnesota	4,139	0.1%
Mississippi	560	0.0%
Missouri	1,611	0.2%
Montana	248	0.0%
Nebraska	1,586	0.1%
Nevada	2,597	0.1%
New Hampshire	781	0.1%
New Jersey	15,566	0.2%
New Mexico	2,142	0.1%
New York	28,590	0.2%
North Carolina	18,389	0.2%
North Dakota	11	0.0%
Ohio	8,388	0.1%
Oklahoma	3,981	0.1%
Oregon	2,475	0.1%
Pennsylvania	12,931	0.1%
Rhode Island	2,378	0.2%
South Carolina	5,443	0.1%
South Dakota	53	0.0%
Tennessee	11,789	0.2%
Texas	122,038	0.4%
Utah	25,000	0.5%
Vermont	346	0.1%
Virginia	12,400	0.1%
Washington	5,150	0.1%
West Virginia	261	0.0%
Wisconsin	3,726	0.0%
Wyoming	403	0.1%
Total U.S. Venezuelan Population	814,080	0.2%

=== U.S. metropolitan areas with the largest Venezuelan populations ===
The largest populations of Venezuelans are situated in the following metropolitan areas (Source: 2021 estimate):

1. Miami-Fort Lauderdale-West Palm Beach, FL MSA - 177,730 - 2.92%
2. Orlando-Kissimmee-Sanford, FL MSA – 77,541 - 2.88%
3. Houston-Sugar Land-Baytown, TX MSA – 60,308 - 0.84%
4. New York-Northern New Jersey-Long Island, NY-NJ-PA-CT MSA – 41,915 - 0.21%
5. Atlanta-Sandy Springs-Marietta, GA MSA – 24,211 - 0.39%
6. Salt Lake City, UT MSA - 20,000 - 0.50%
7. Dallas–Fort Worth-Arlington, TX MSA - 19,124 - 0.23%
8. Tampa-St. Petersburg-Clearwater, FL MSA – 18,508 - 0.58%
9. Washington-Arlington-Alexandria, DC-VA-MD-WV MSA – 14,480 - 0.23%
10. Chicago-Joliet-Naperville, IL-IN-WI MSA - 13,621 - 0.14%
11. Los Angeles-Long Beach-Santa Ana, CA MSA – 11,867 - 0.09%
12. Austin-Round Rock-Georgetown, MSA - 9,941 - 0.42%
13. Boston-Cambridge-Newton, MA-NH Metro Area - 7,789 - 0.16%
14. Charlotte-Gastonia-Rock Hill, NC-SC MSA - 6,649 - 0.25%
15. Denver-Aurora-Lakewood, CO MSA - 6,186 - 0.21%
16. Jacksonville, FL-GA MSA - 5,097 - 0.20%
17. San Francisco-Oakland-Fremont, CA MSA - 4,971 - 0.11%
18. Philadelphia-Camden-Wilmington, PA-NJ-DE-MD MSA - 4,339 - 0.07%
19. Cape Coral-Fort Myers, FL MSA - 3,949 - 0.50%
20. Bridgeport-Stamford-Norwalk, CT MSA - 3,528 - 0.37%
21. Austin-Round Rock-Georgetown, TX MSA - 2,381 - 0.11%

=== States with highest Venezuelan population ===
The 10 states with the largest Venezuelan population were (Source: Census 2020):

1. Florida – 380,972 (1.7% of state population)
2. Texas – 122,038 (0.4% of state population)
3. Georgia – 33,227 (0.3% of state population)
4. California – 29,345 (0.1% of state population)
5. New York – 28,590 (0.2% of state population)
6. Utah – 25,321 (0.5% of state population)
7. North Carolina – 18,389 (0.2% of state population)
8. Illinois - 16,730 (0.1% of state population)
9. New Jersey – 15,566 (0.2% of state population)
10. Pennsylvania – 12,931 (0.1% of state population)

=== Population distribution by Venezuelan ancestry ===
Among U.S. communities in 2000 wherein one thousand or more people indicated their ancestry, those where at least 1% of people claimed Venezuelan ancestry were:

1. Doral, Florida 8.22%
2. Weston, Florida 4.1%
3. Fontainebleau, Florida 3.14%
4. The Hammocks, Florida 3.14%
5. Key Biscayne, Florida 2.36%
6. North Bay Village, Florida 2.15%
7. Sunny Isles Beach, Florida 1.96%
8. Miami Beach, Florida 1.79%
9. Virginia Gardens, Florida 1.58%
10. Kendale Lakes, Florida 1.54%
11. Kendall, Florida 1.47%
12. Surfside, Florida 1.41%
13. Richmond West, Florida 1.36%
14. West Sand Lake, New York 1.34%
15. Aventura, Florida 1.31%
16. Country Club, Florida 1.26%
17. Bal Harbour, Florida 1.21%
18. Coral Gables, Florida 1.17%
19. Bay Harbor Islands, Florida 1.15%
20. Miami Lakes, Florida 1.06%
21. Tamiami, Florida 1.06%
22. Miami Springs, Florida 1.01%
23. Sand Lake, New York 1.01%

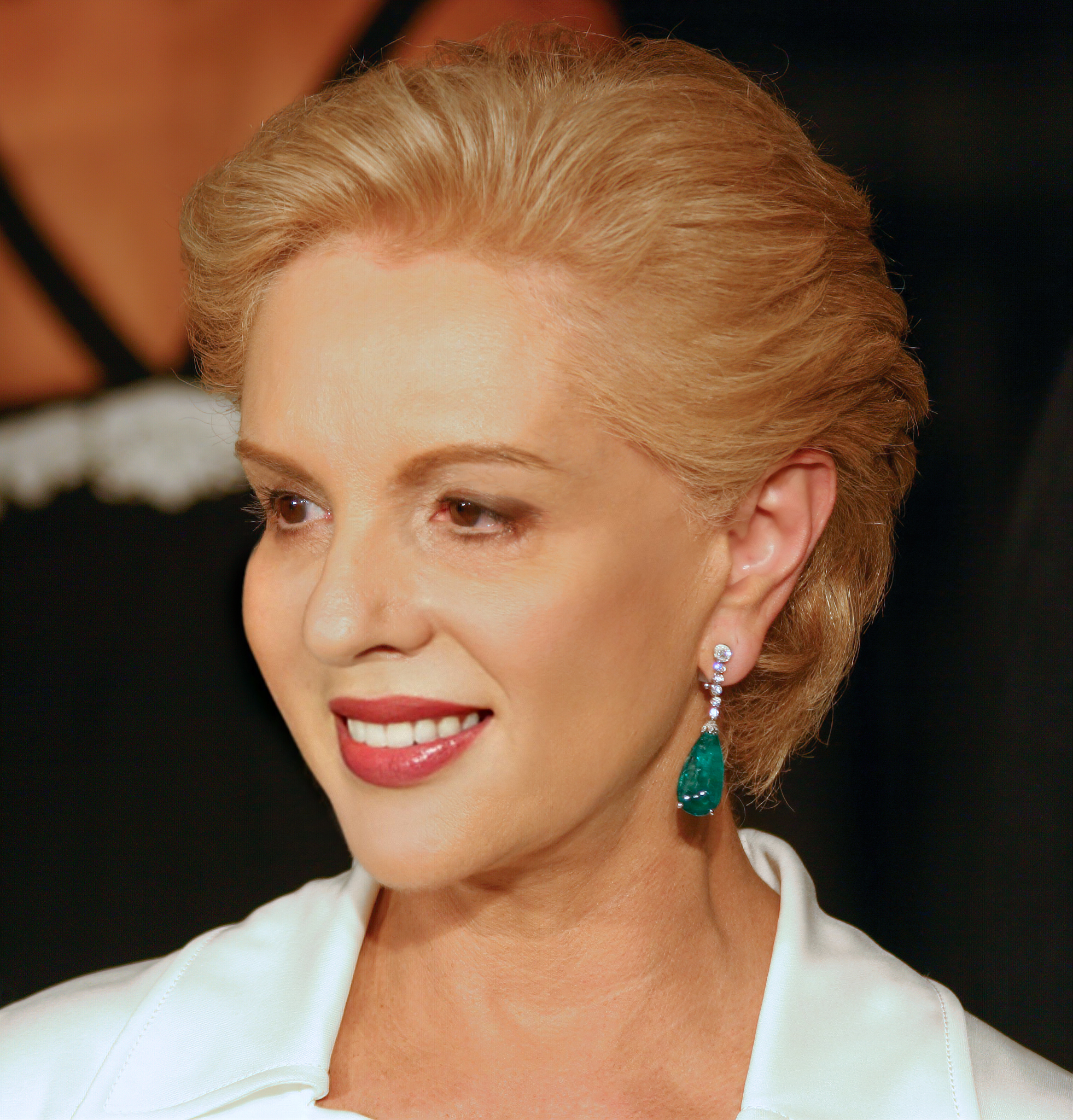
Carolina Herrera, fashion designer

== Socioeconomics ==
As of 2024, 49% of Venezuelan Americans have a bachelor’s degree, compared to 37% of the U.S. population. 16% possess a graduate degree or higher.

13% of Venezuelan Americans live in poverty.

== Relations with Venezuela ==
Venezuelan Americans still maintain strong relations with their country of origin, which can easily be seen in business, family, and community life. Venezuelan Americans often report on the social and current events in Venezuela and first-generation immigrants visit there frequently. It is also quite common for Venezuelans to visit their relatives in the United States.

== See also ==
- Venezuelan diaspora
- United States–Venezuela relations
- Venezuelan refugee crisis
