= Luisana Pérez (journalist) =

Venezuelan, White House Director of Coalitions Media

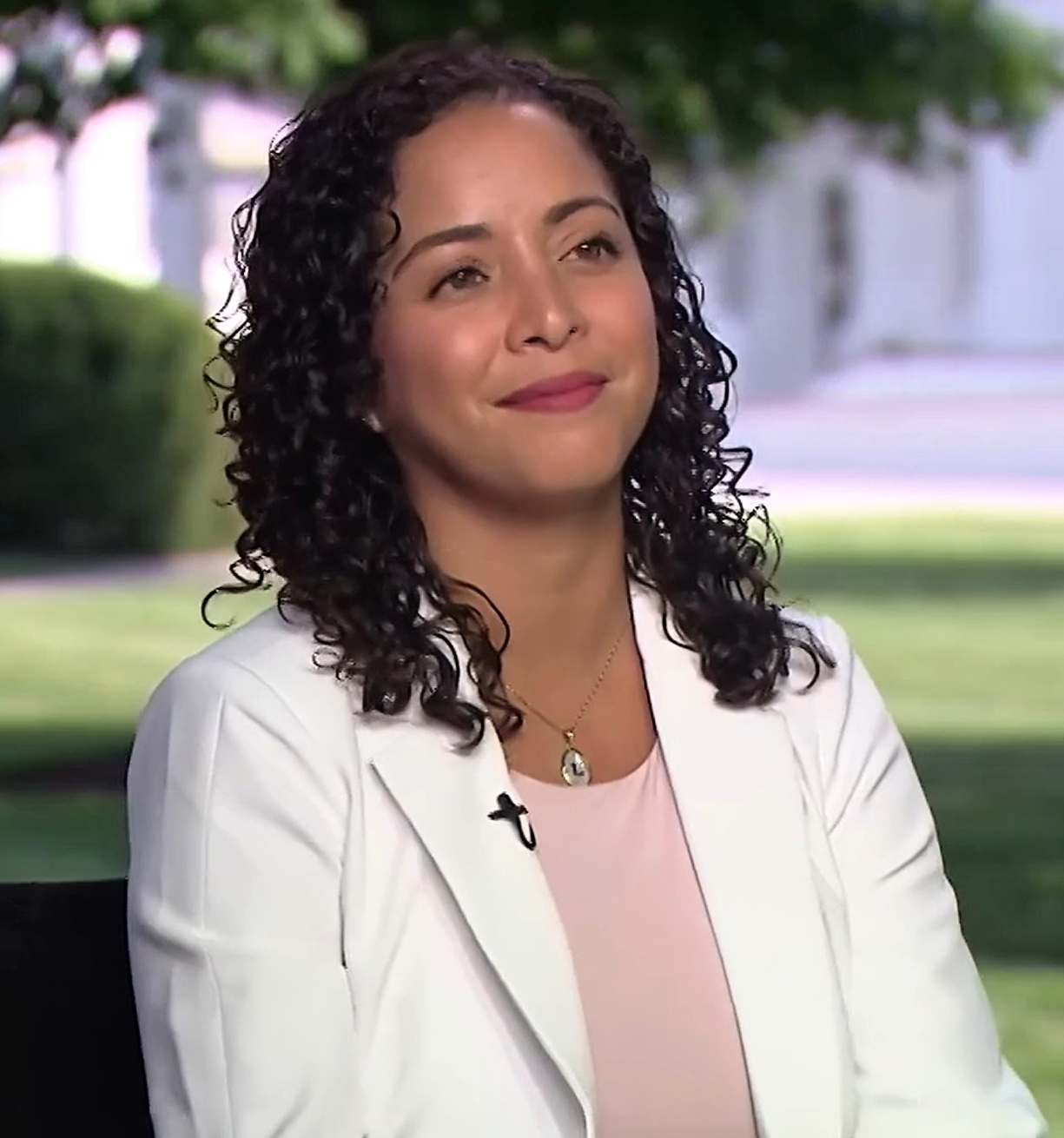
- Pérez speaks with Voice of America in 2021

White House Director of Coalitions Media
- Incumbent
- Assumed office September 2, 2021
- President: Joe Biden
- Preceded by: Audrey López

Personal details
- Born: Luisana Pérez Fernández; Venezuela
- Political party: Democratic
- Education: Central University of Venezuela (BA)

Luisana Pérez Fernández is a Venezuelan-American communications expert and political advisor. She served as Special Assistant to the President and director of Coalitions media for the Joe Biden administration.

== Early life and education ==
Pérez is a native of Caracas, Venezuela. She earned a Bachelor of Arts degree in international studies from the Central University of Venezuela.

== Career ==
In 2018, she became involved in the re-election campaign of Democratic Senator Bill Nelson as the Hispanic press secretary and spokesperson. Luisana also served as district director for Florida State Senator José Javier Rodríguez and as deputy director of communications for Miami-Dade County Mayor Daniella Levine Cava, where she collaborated with the integration of Hispanic media in communication plans.

In 2020, she joined the Joe Biden 2020 presidential campaign in Florida, and worked as deputy director of communications for the Florida Democratic Party (FDP) and as director of Hispanic media. Her tasks included designing messages on topics such as the Temporary Protected Status (TPS) for Venezuelans, immigration, and health care. Pérez obtained U.S. citizenship in August 2020, voting for the first time in the 2020 presidential election for Biden.

She subsequently worked as a press secretary and spokesperson for the United States Department of Health and Human Services (HHS) led by Secretary Xavier Becerra, where she collaborated to implement campaigns to improve vaccination rates against the coronavirus among Hispanics and to promote the special enrollment period of the Affordable Care Act (ACA) ordered by Biden in response to the crisis generated by the COVID-19 pandemic.

On 2 September 2021, the White House announced the addition of Luisana to Biden's presidential team as the new director of Hispanic media, replacing Audrey López.

Formerly, she was a Special Assistant to the President and White House Director of Coalitions Media.

== Personal life ==
In 2011, Pérez emigrated from Venezuela to the United States, seeking new opportunities. She became an American citizen in 2020.
