= François-Henri Pinault =

French businessman (born 1962)

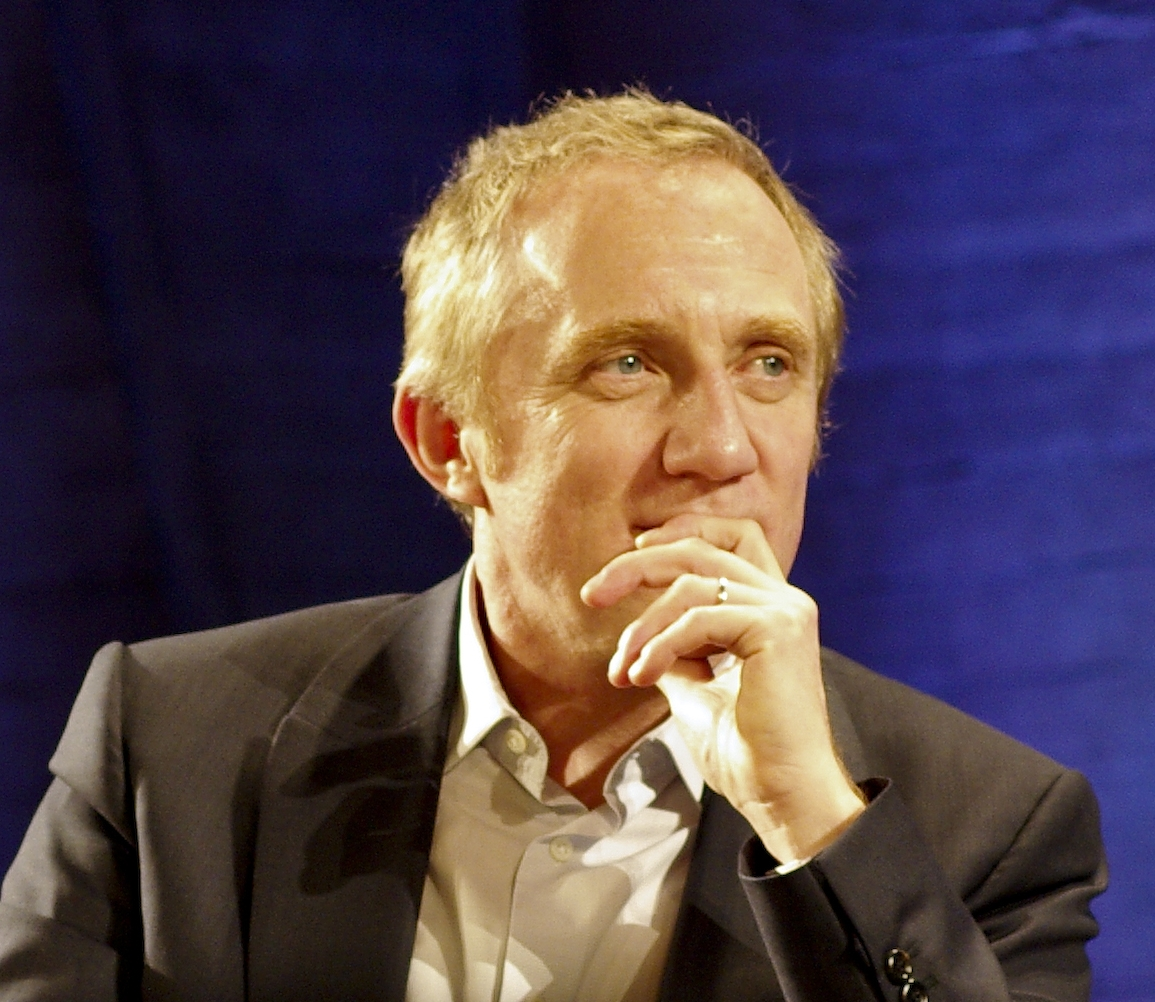
- Pinault in 2011
- Born: 28 May 1962 (age 64); Rennes, France
- Education: HEC Paris
- Occupation: Businessman
- Years active: 1985–present
- Title: President of Kering; President of Groupe Artémis
- Spouses: Dorothée Lepère (m. 1996; div. 2004) Salma Hayek (m. 2009)
- Partner: Linda Evangelista (2005–2006)
- Children: 4
- Father: François Pinault

François-Henri Pinault (French: [fʁɑ̃swa ɑ̃ʁi pino]; born 28 May 1962) is a French businessman and the son of billionaire François Pinault. François-Henri took the reins of his father's retail conglomerate Pinault-Printemps-Redoute in 2005, and turned it into the luxury group Kering (Gucci, Yves Saint Laurent, Balenciaga, Bottega Veneta) in 2013. He has been president of the family-owned investment holding Groupe Artémis (Château Latour, Christie's, Pinault Collection, Creative Artists Agency) since 2003. He has been married to the film producer and actress Salma Hayek since 2009.

== Early life ==
François-Henri Pinault is the son of François Pinault, the founder of Pinault SA, which would later become the retail conglomerate Pinault-Printemps-Redoute (PPR) and then Kering. He was born and raised in Rennes. He graduated from HEC School of Management in 1985. During his studies, he co-founded the CRM company Soft Computing with other fellow students and interned at Hewlett-Packard in Paris as a database-software developer. After graduating, he completed military service at the French Consulate in Los Angeles, and was in charge of studying fashion and new technology sectors.

== Career ==
In 1987, Pinault began his career at PPR (then called Pinault Distribution) where he was promoted manager of the buying department in 1988, head manager of France Bois Industries in 1989, and head manager of Pinault Distribution in 1990. In the 1990s, as Pinault Distribution became Pinault-Printemps-Redoute, an international player in the retail sector, Pinault became president of CFAO in 1993 and CEO of Fnac in 1997. In May 2003, Pinault became vice-president of PPR, and president of Groupe Artémis, PPR's parent company.

In March 2005, Pinault was appointed President and CEO of Pinault-Printemps-Redoute. The group had purchased Gucci and Yves Saint Laurent in 1999 and was going through a major overhaul of its organization and portfolio. Under Pinault's leadership, the group divested its retail assets (Conforama, CFAO, Printemps, Fnac, La Redoute), merged PPR with the Gucci group (Gucci, Yves Saint-Laurent, Bottega Veneta, Balenciaga, Boucheron, Alexander McQueen) in 2011, and then further expanded its portfolio of luxury brands (Brioni, Qeelin, Pomellato, Ulysse Nardin, Creed, Valentino). After changing PPR's name to Kering (Note: The new name is a reference to his Breton roots, "Ker" meaning "home" in the region's dialect, and sounds like "caring") in June 2013 to conclude the group's transformation, Pinault stopped acquiring luxury houses to focus on brand development and organic growth. Kering's major fashion houses went through a growth cycle that took each of their revenue beyond the billion dollar mark ($10 billion for Gucci alone). The group launched the eyewear manufacturing arm Kering Eyewear in 2013 which also passed the billion dollar mark in revenue after ten years in the running. Kering's revenue stalled around $20 billion in 2023, "a trying year" according to Pinault. In 2025, he stepped down as CEO of Kering, replaced by Luca de Meo, but remained president of the board.

In the early 2010s, he implemented the "environmental profit and loss" (EP&L) accounting method that was gradually applied to all the brands owned by the group. He launched the Kering Foundation in 2008 to support women's rights, and the Women in Motion program with the Cannes Film Festival in 2015 to raise awareness around women-related issues in the film industry. In 2009, he financed the documentary Home by Yann Arthus-Bertrand, which shows aerial shots of various places on Earth and discusses how humanity is threatening the ecological balance of the planet. In January 2018, Kering was named top sustainable textile, apparel and luxury goods corporation in the Corporate Knights Global 100 index. Pinault was mandated by the French President Emmanuel Macron to set up the Fashion Pact during the G7 summit in August 2019, an initiative signed by 56 fashion firms committing to reduce their environmental impact.

Since 2003, Pinault has been the president of Groupe Artémis which owns Kering (majority shareholder), wines (Château Latour, Clos de Tart, Champagne Jacquesson), the auction house Christie's, news magazine Le Point and publishing house Tallandier, cruise operator Compagnie du Ponant, fashion brands (Courrèges, Giambattista Valli) and the football team Stade Rennais F.C. (Ligue 1). In 2019, Pinault celebrated the first Coupe de France victory of the Stade Rennais F.C. since its acquisition by his family in 1998. Artémis also controls Pinault Collection which operates three contemporary art museums in Europe. Through Artémis, the Pinault family donated $113 million to repair Notre-Dame de Paris after the 2019 fire. In 2023, through Artémis, Pinault led the acquisition of a majority stake in the talent sports agency Creative Artists Agency (CAA) for an estimated $7 billion, "a deal that shows the ever-growing convergence of fashion and fame" according to The New York Times. In May 2026, he was appointed chairman of the board of Christie's.

== Main roles ==
- President of Kering
- Manager of Financière Pinault
- President of Groupe Artémis
- Co-founder and member of the board of Soft Computing
- Owner of Stade Rennais, a French Ligue 1 football club
- Member of the management board of Château Latour
- Member of the board of Christie's

== Awards and honours ==
- 2006: Chevalier de la Légion d'Honneur
- 2016: Vanity Fair Hall of Fame
- 2018: #8 Businessperson of the Year by Fortune
- 2019: Among the "30 best CEO of the world" according to Barron's
- 2019 : 3rd of the "100 best CEOs worldwide" according to Harvard Business Review
- 2020: Fiorino d'Oro, the highest award of the city of Florence

== Wealth ==
In 2023, the French magazine Challenges estimated the wealth of the Pinault family at 31.2 billion euros. In 2024, Forbes's estimation was at 25.7 billion dollars.

== Personal life ==
Pinault was married to Dorothée Lepère from 1996 to 2004. They had a son and a daughter together. He dated supermodel Linda Evangelista from September 2005 to January 2006. They had a son together (born October 2006).

In April 2006, he started dating actress Salma Hayek. Their daughter was born on 21 September 2007. The couple married on 14 February 2009 in Paris and in April 2009, they renewed their wedding vows in Venice.

His son François Pinault Jr. is married to Lara Cosima Henckel von Donnersmarck
