= François Pinault =

French billionaire businessman (born 1936)

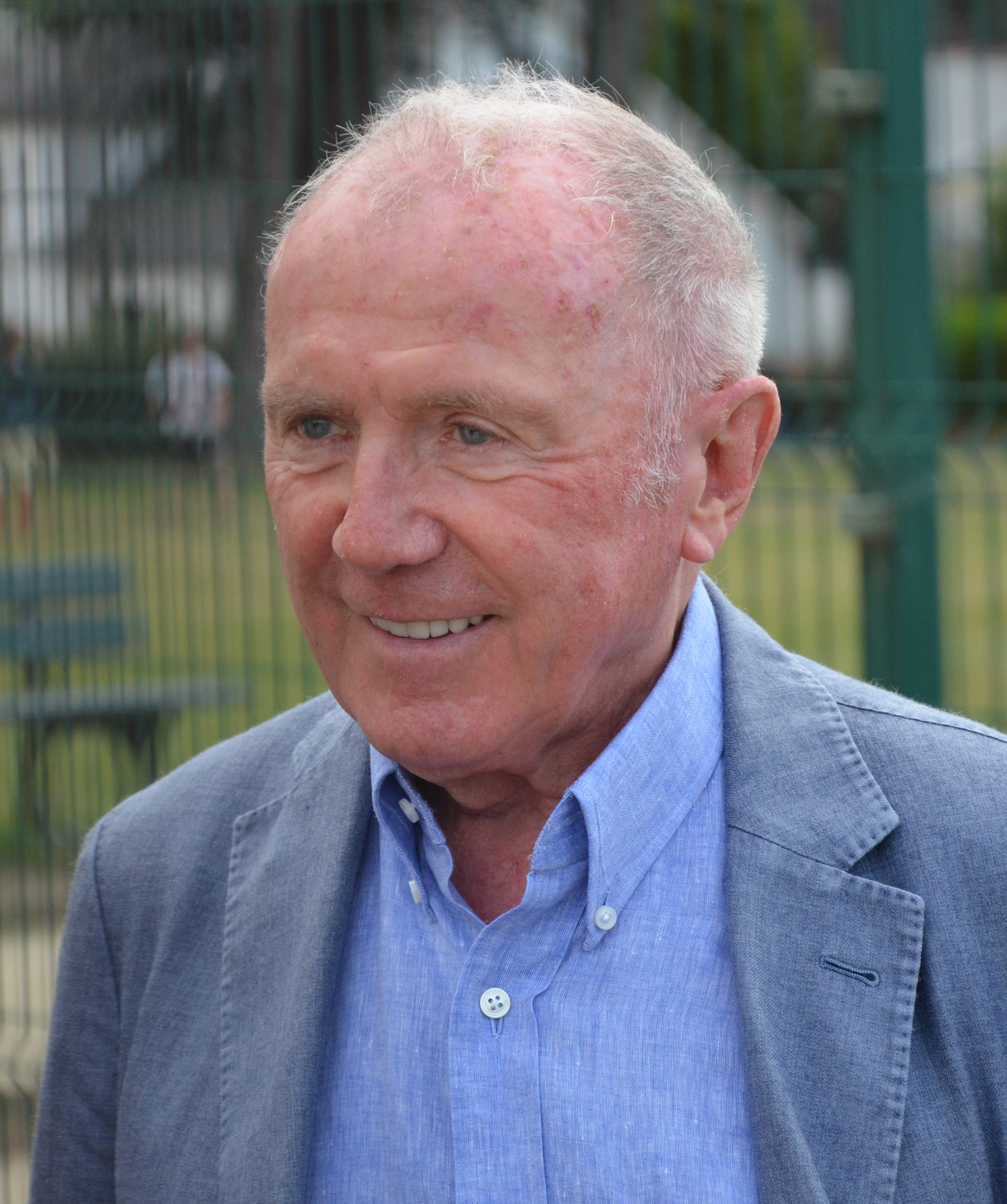
- Pinault in 2015
- Born: François Henri Joseph Pinault; 21 August 1936 (age 89); Les Champs-Géraux, France
- Occupations: Businessman; Art collector
- Known for: Kering (founder); Groupe Artémis (founder); Pinault Collection (founder)
- Spouses: Louise Gautier (m. 1962; div. 1967) Maryvonne Campbell (m. 1970)
- Children: 3, including François-Henri Pinault
- Relatives: Salma Hayek (daughter-in-law)

François Henri Joseph Pinault (French pronunciation: [fʁɑ̃swa pino]; born 21 August 1936) is a French billionaire businessman, founder of the luxury group Kering (Gucci, Yves Saint Laurent, Balenciaga, Bottega Veneta) and the investment holding company Groupe Artémis (Château Latour, Christie's, Pinault Collection, Stade Rennais FC, Creative Artists Agency). In the early 1960s, Pinault started a timber-trading business. His company Pinault S.A. was taken public in 1988, and renamed Pinault-Printemps-Redoute (PPR) during the 1990s after it had turned into an important retail and distribution company. In 2003, he passed on the management of his companies to his elder son François-Henri. He owns an important collection of contemporary art that is on display in his own museums (Palazzo Grassi and Punta della Dogana in Venice, Bourse de commerce in Paris).

== Early life ==
François Pinault was born on 21 August 1936 in Les Champs-Géraux, a commune in the north of Brittany in the west of France. His father was a timber trader.

Pinault grew up in the rural French countryside, beginning his career working for his family's timber business. He dropped out of school at the age of 16 from the College Saint-Martin in Rennes. In 1956, he enlisted in the military during the Algerian war. Afterwards, he returned to the family business, which he sold following his father's death.

== Career ==
François Pinault started his first business in 1963 as a wood-trading company. Pinault SA grew strongly and diversified its portfolio by acquiring several companies facing bankruptcy, including Chapelle Darblay, to restructure them. On 25 October 1988, Pinault SA was taken public in the Paris stock exchange and started to invest in specialty store chains. He acquired a majority stake in CFAO (specialized distribution in Africa), Conforama (furnishing retailer), Printemps (department store), La Redoute (mail order), and Fnac (books and electronics retailer). Pinault SA was renamed Pinault-Printemps-Redoute (PPR) in 1993.

In 1992, Pinault manage the Pinault family's investments. Controlled 100% by Pinault and his family, Artémis controls the vineyards Château Latour (Bordeaux), Clos de Tart (Bourgogne), Domaine d'Eugénie (Vosne-Romanée), Château Grillet (Rhône Valley), Eisele Vineyard (Napa Valley), and the champagne Jacquesson. Artémis bought the news magazine Le Point in 1997, the auction house Christie's in 1998, and the luxury cruise company Ponant in 2015. Pinault has been the owner of the Rennes football club since 1998. In September 2023, Artémis acquired 53% of Creative Artists Agency for $7 billion.

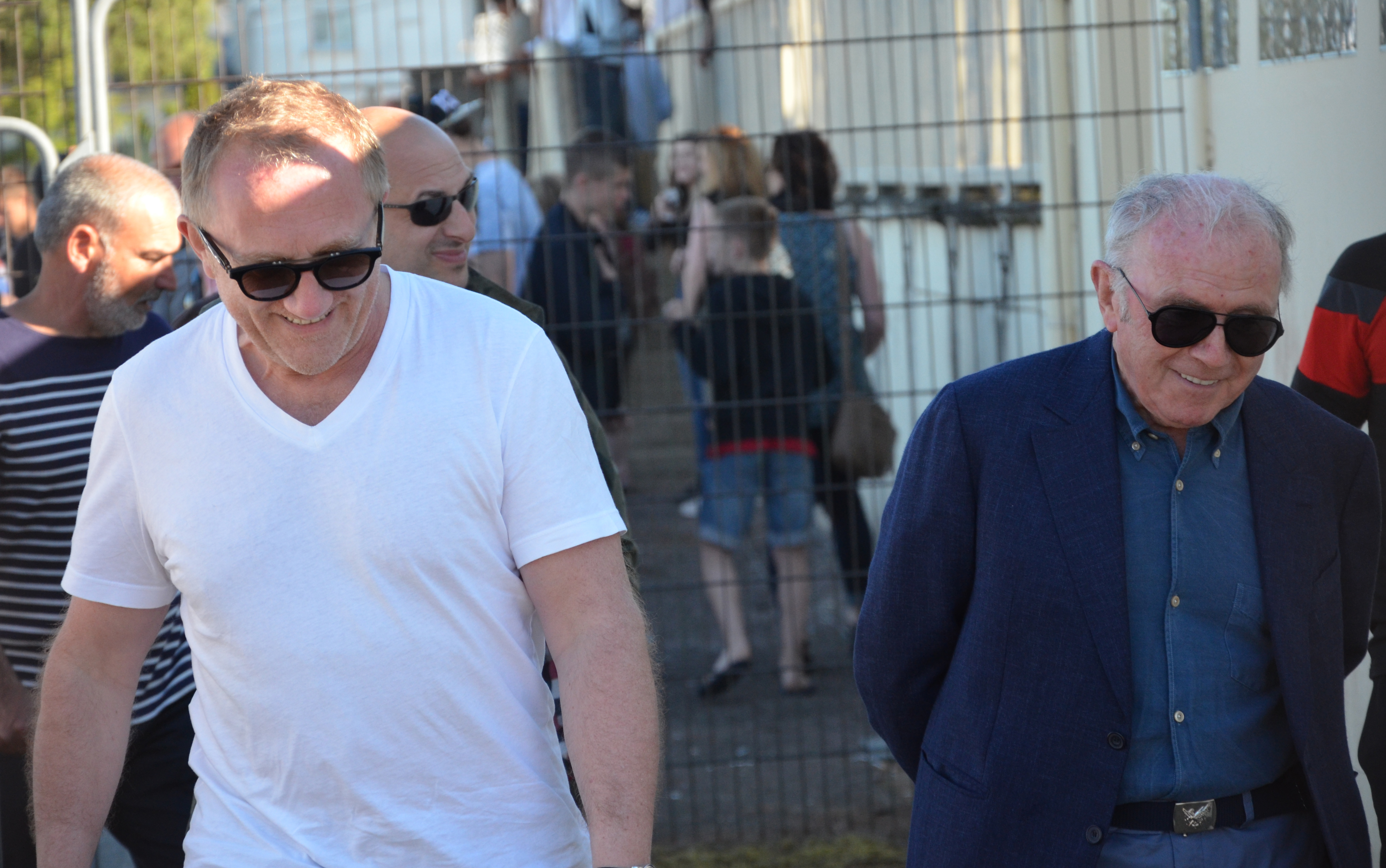
François Pinault and his son François-Henri in 2016.

By the end of the 1990s, François Pinault started to shift his business focus from retail to luxury. In March 1999, Pinault-Printemps-Redoute purchased a controlling 42% stake of the Gucci Group for $3 billion, and bought the Yves Saint Laurent company. Pinault then purchased the French jewelry company Boucheron in 2000, Balenciaga in 2001, and the British fashion house Alexander McQueen. In May 2003, he handed over the management of his companies to his son François-Henri who pursued the consolidation of the luxury group with new acquisitions (Brioni, Girard-Perregaux, Pomellato...) and changed the group's name to Kering in 2013.

== Art ==
François Pinault collects art of the 20th century (Mondrian, Picasso, Man Ray, ...) before following contemporary artists (David Hammons, Rudolf Stingel, Damien Hirst, Jeff Koons, Subodh Gupta, Paul McCarthy, Bruce Nauman, Donald Judd, Robert Ryman, ...). In 2023, his art collection contained approximately 10,000 works.

Pinault bought his first significant painting, Cour de ferme (1891) by Paul Sérusier, in the early 1970s, and continued acquiring early-20th-century French artists (Picasso, Braque, Léger, Yves Tanguy). In 1990, he bought Piet Mondrian's Losangique II for $8.8 million, a significant acquisition that redefined his approach to collecting art: "I understood then that I could gain access to the best art of my lifetime and that I could dream of a collection of that quality". He started acquiring post-war paintings (Rauschenberg, Warhol) and developed close ties with contemporary artists (Jeff Koons, Cy Twombly, Richard Serra, Damien Hirst, Cindy Sherman, David Hammons). In 1998, he acquired the auction house Christie's for 1.2 billion euros, two years before private auction houses were legalized in France. He acquired art at a rapid pace, including monumental work by Richard Serra and Mike Kelley, but was lacking space and stored 80% of his acquisitions.

In 2005, François Pinault bought the company Palazzo Grassi SpA which operated the Palazzo Grassi in Venice. The Japanese architect Tadao Ando renovated the historical building which housed the first exhibition of Pinault Collection in 2006. One year later, the Venice city council awarded the tender of the Punta della Dogana, which had been abandoned for 30 years, to Pinault Collection, adding 5,000 m^{2} to the Palazzo Grassi space in Venice. Tadao Ando also restored this historical site, which reopened to the public in June 2009. In 2013, Pinault achieved the third chapter of his cultural project in Venice with the renovation and transformation of the Teatrino, an open-air theater in ruins. Designed once again by Tadao Ando, the new Teatrino holds a 225-seat auditorium.

In 2016, Pinault and the city of Paris announced their plan to turn the Bourse de commerce in the center of Paris (1st arrondissement) into a new, Pinault Collection-branded contemporary art museum. Tadao Ando was put in charge of transforming the historic building. The museum opened in May 2021.

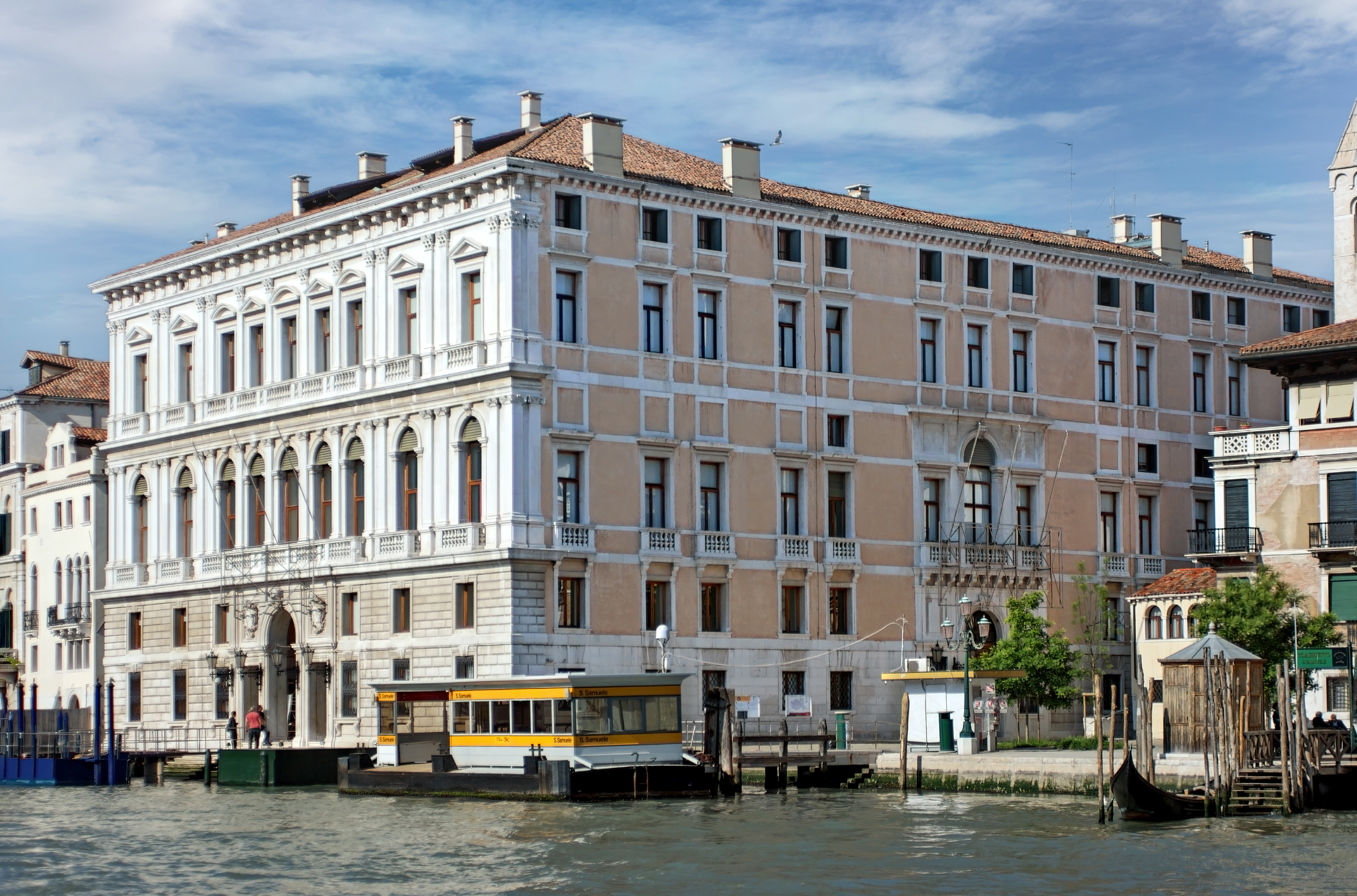
Palazzo Grassi, Venice.

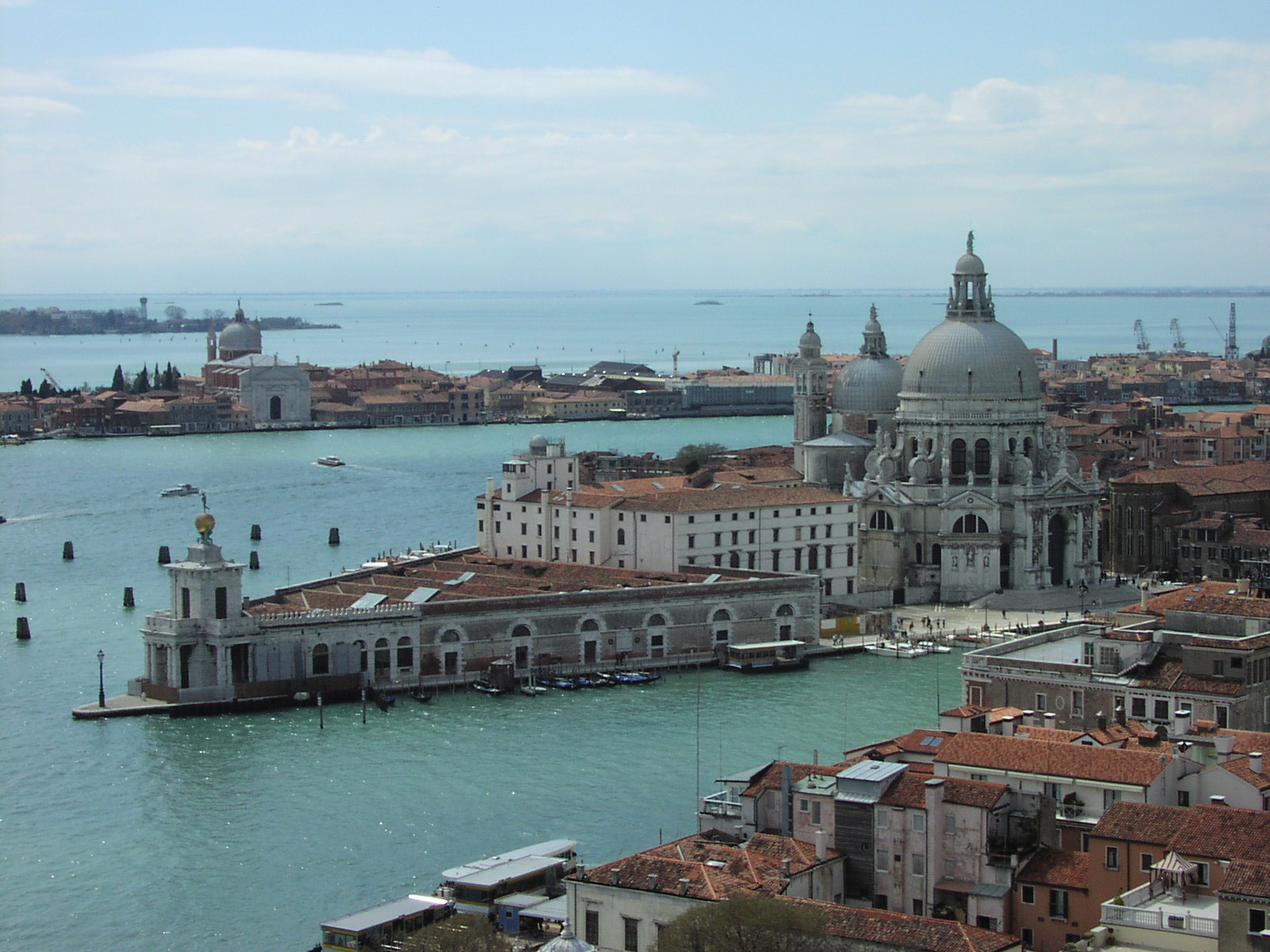
Punta della Dogana, Venice.

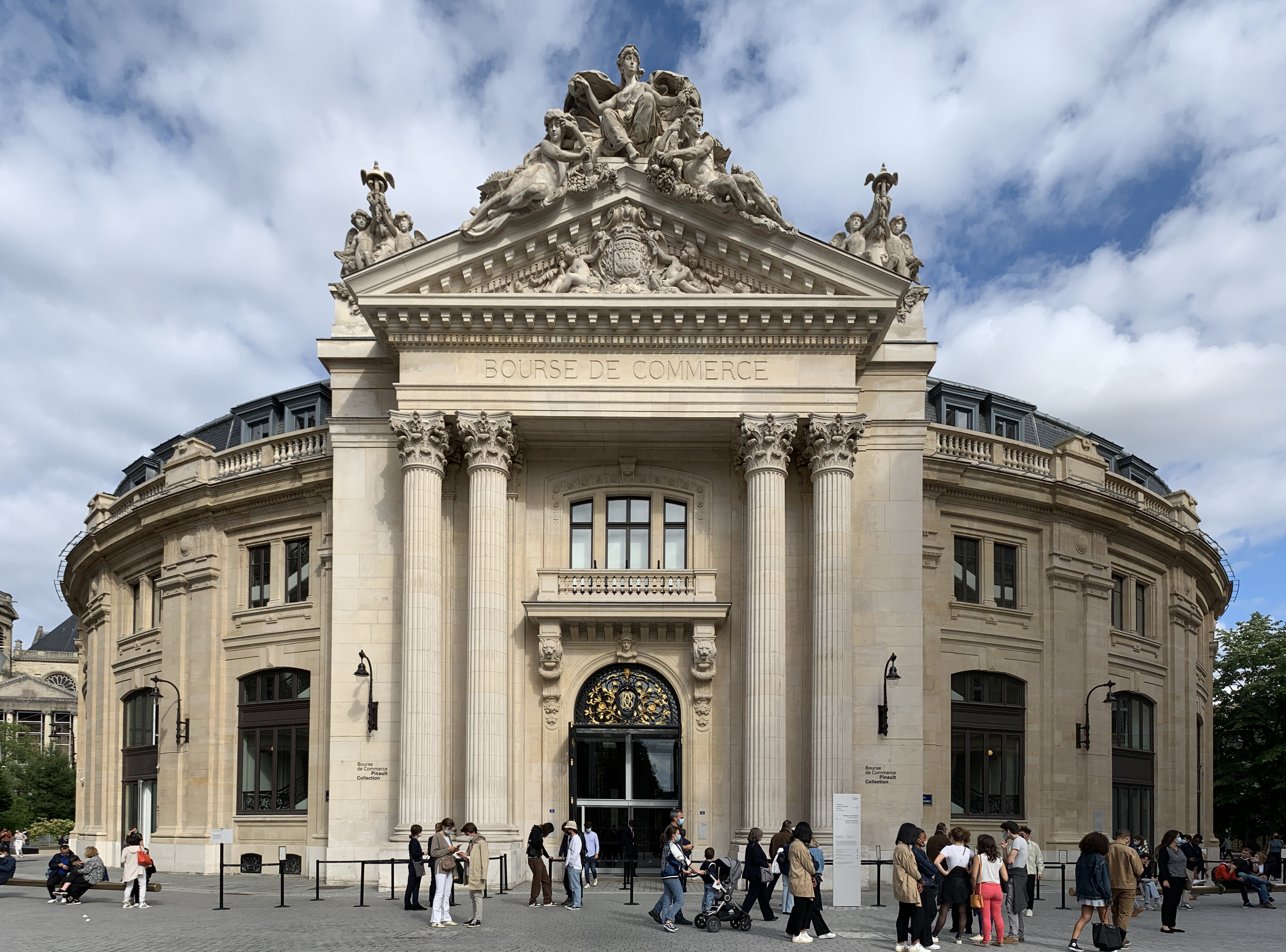
Bourse de commerce, Paris.

In 2014, François Pinault launched, through the Pinault Collection, an artist residency program in Lens (Northern France) which opened in 2015. In 2015, in memory of his friend the writer (and Picasso biographer) Pierre Daix who died in 2014, Pinault created the Pierre Daix Prize to reward an outstanding book on modern and contemporary art every year.

== Other commitments ==
=== Environment ===
In 1990, following a fire in the Paimpont forest in Brittany, Pinault immediately financed the reforestation project. In 2000, he provided a significant financial assistance to help the islands in Brittany affected by the oil spill following the sinking of the Erika. In 2022, he pledged to contribute 500,000 euros to restore the chapel Saint-Michel of Brasparts in Monts d'Arrée, and the butte on which it stands on, after it had been ravaged by fire.

=== Historical buildings ===
In 2000, Pinault bought the Théâtre Marigny which was fully renovated from 2013 to 2018. In 2012, he bought the Villa Greystones in Dinard, France, designed by Michel Roux-Spitz (monument historique in 2019). In 2018, Pinault made a significant contribution to the restoration of Victor Hugo's house, the Hauteville House, in Guernsey.

After the Notre Dame de Paris fire on 15 April 2019, the Pinault family pledged 100 million euros as a donation to the reconstruction works and repairs of the cathedral.

In 2021, he bought the hôtel particulier Hôtel de Cavoye in the 7th arrondissement of Paris for 80 million euros. He is also the owner of the château de la Mormaire (Yvelines), and of the Hôtel de Clermont-Tonnerre and the Hôtel Choiseul-Praslin (Paris). In 2022, he pledged to finance the restoration of the Chapelle Saint-Michel on top of the Monts d'Arrée that was deteriorated by a wildfire and bought the villa Bel-Esbat located a few hundred meters away from Villa Greystones in Dinard.

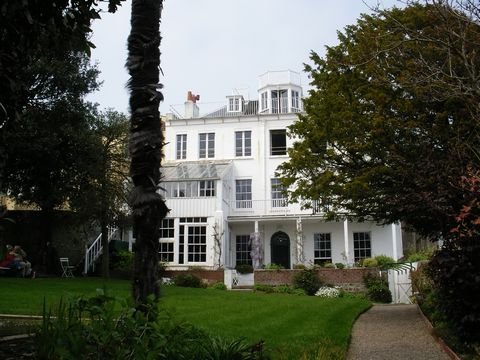
Hauteville House (garden view)

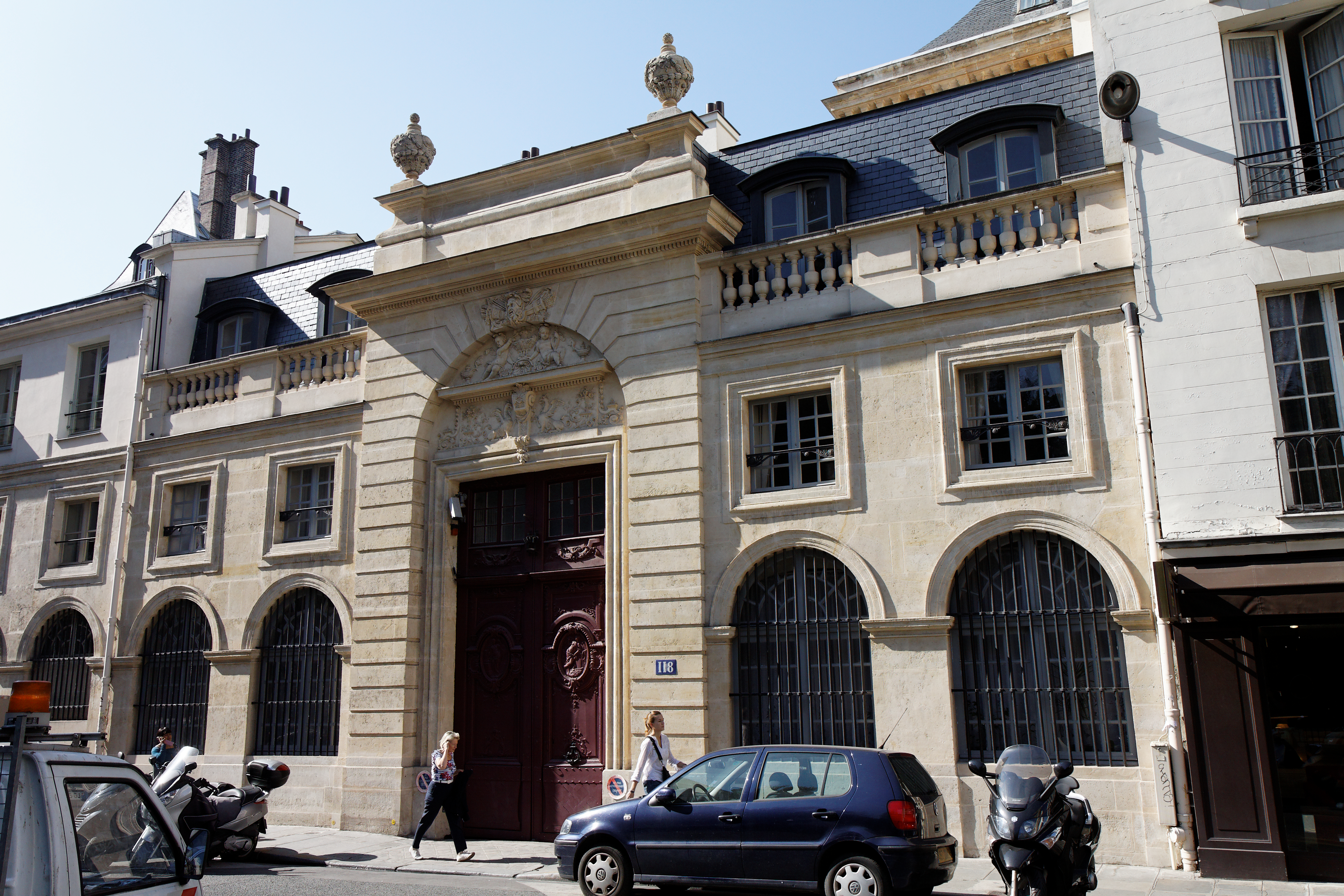
Hôtel de Clermont-Tonnerre

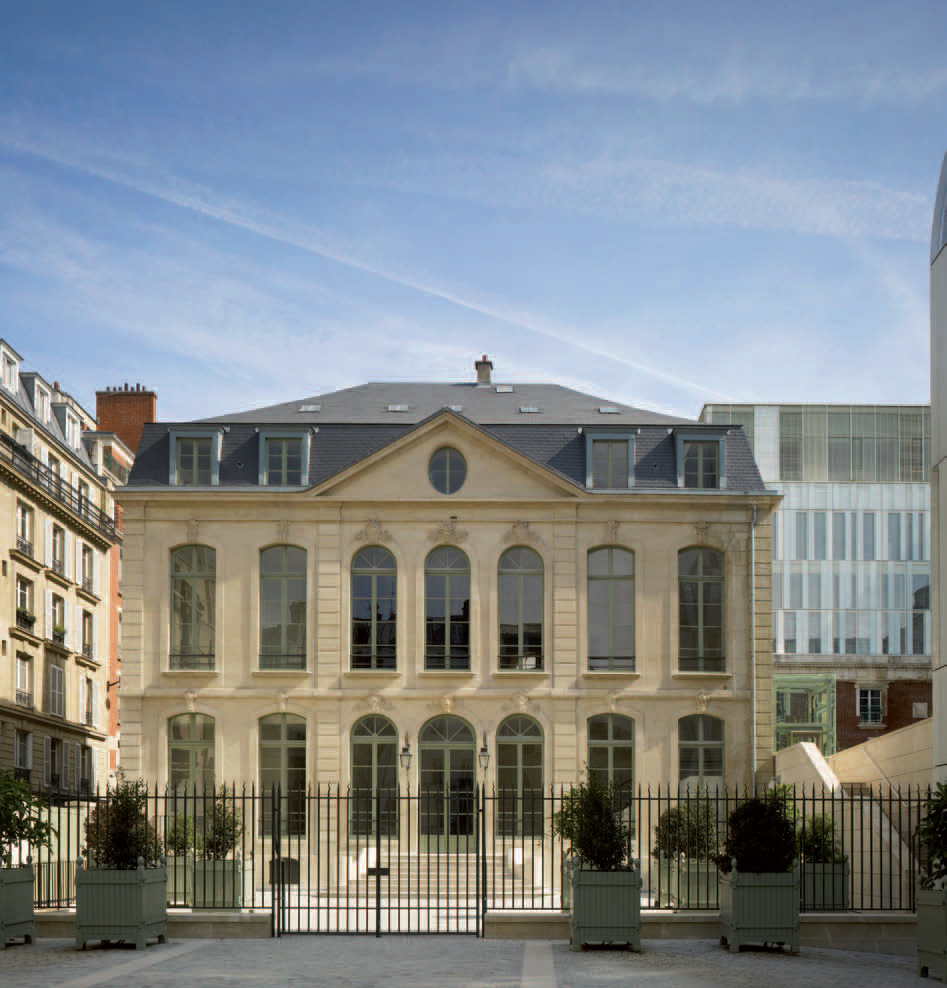
Hôtel Choiseul-Praslin

== Wealth ==
As of September 2023, according to the Bloomberg Billionaires Index, Pinault's wealth was estimated at US$39.1 billion, making him the 32nd-richest person in the world.

In 2024, Forbes estimated Pinault's net worth at $31.6 billion, ranking him as the 54th-richest person in the world.

== Awards ==
- 1958: Cross for Military Valour
- 2006: Breton of the Year by Armor Magazine
- 2006, 2007: Most influential personality in the art world by ArtReview
- 2016: Grand Officer of the Ordine della Stella d'Italia
- 2017: Grand-croix of the Legion of Honour, Grand officier (2011), Commandeur (2007), Officier (1997), Chevalier (1988)

== Personal life ==
In 1962, he married Louise Gautier. They had three children: François-Henri, Dominique, and Laurence Pinault. The couple divorced five years later, and in 1970, Pinault married Maryvonne Campbell, an antique trader.

He is the father-in-law of the actress and producer Salma Hayek, who is married to his son François-Henri.

In 2022, the primary school of Trévérien where Pinault was a pupil from 1941 to 1947, was officially renamed École primaire François Pinault.
