= Just Sunnies =

Retail store

- Type: Retail
- Industry: Fashion
- Founded: 2007
- Headquarters: Queensland, Australia
- Key people: Jason Rose
- Products: Sunglasses and Prescription Eyewear
- Website: justsunnies.com.au

Just Sunnies is an online sunglass retail store founded in 2007 by Jason Rose. It provides sunglasses from several manufacturers, including Luxottica, Safilo, Marchon, Kering, and Sunshades. Just Sunnies launched its Optical branch of the business in June 2023, allowing customers to add their prescription to 6,000 pairs of sunglasses and glasses. The company enables customers to customize their glasses with signature lenses and lens technology of different brands.

== Overview ==
Just Sunnies is an online sunglass retailer and was founded by Jason Rose in 2007. It provides a range of sunglasses and access to major local and foreign eyewear brands, including Ray-Ban, Prada, Oakley, Maui Jim, and Gucci. The company also supports local Australian brands in its collection.

Jason Rose began his career in the sunglass industry on June 16, 2003, with Bright Eyes Sunglasses under the mentorship of Ralph Edwards and Geoff Harbert. In 2007, Bright Eyes was acquired by Oakley and subsequently by Luxottica. Rose left to explore the online sunglass retail market, leading to the founding of Just Sunnies.

The company is collaborating with different brands to develop custom prescription sunglasses where customers can customize their glasses with the brand's signature lenses and lens technology on its website. Just Sunnies was nominated for the Gold Coast Business Excellence Award in 2022.

It was also nominated for best email marketing in 2021 for the All-Star Bash Nominations. Just Sunnies was also nominated for the Technology Champion award in 2023 from the Online Retailer ORIAS awards and the Innovation Retailer of the Year award for the National Retail Awards in 2023.
