= Roberto Vedovotto =

Italian businessman

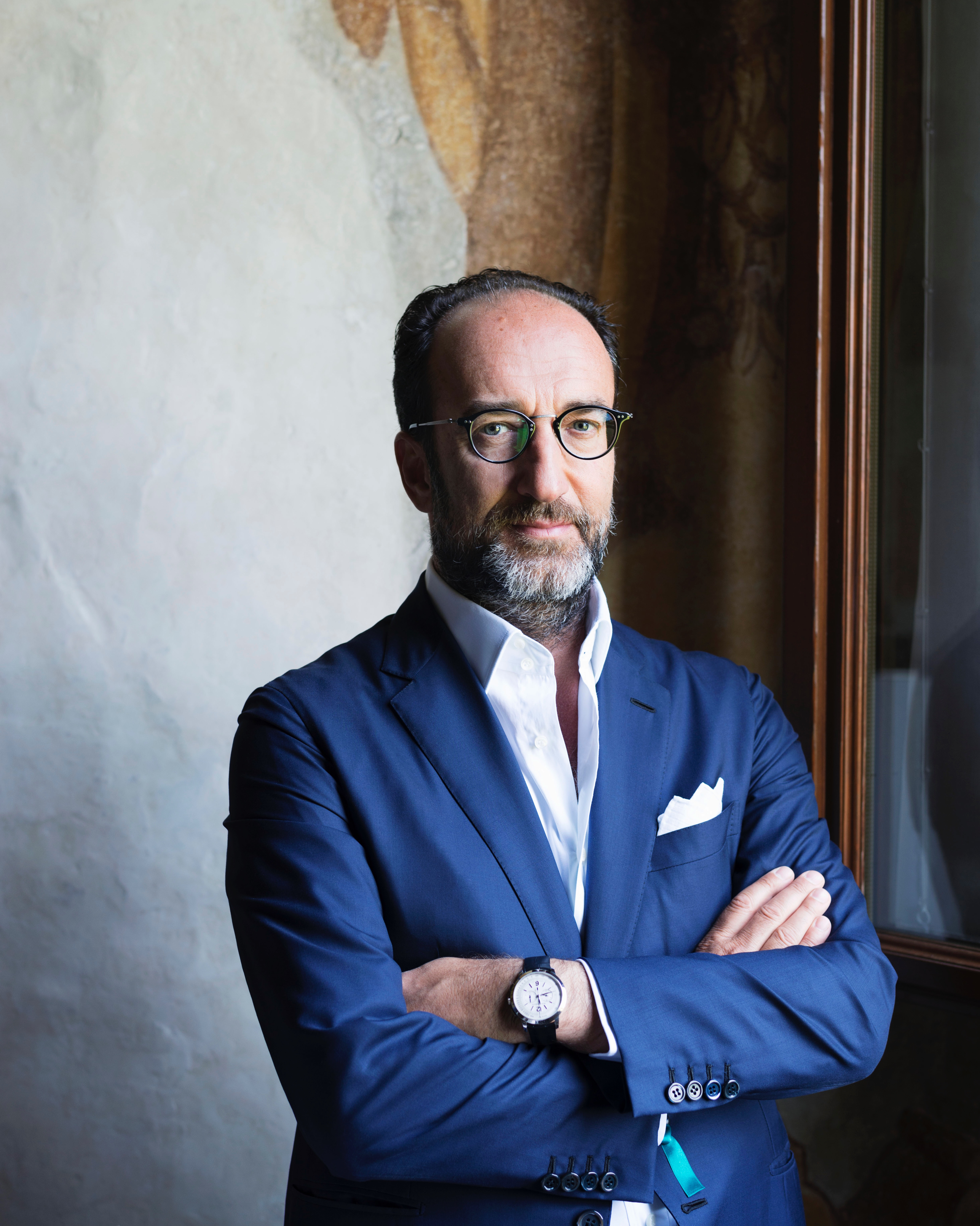
Image of Roberto Vedovotto

Roberto Vedovotto is an Italian businessman, founder and CEO of Kering Eyewear since 2014.

== Biography ==
Vedovotto holds a bachelor degree in economics from the Bocconi University (1989) and a master's degree in business administration from the London Business School (1994). After his bachelor's degree, Vedovotto was a managing director at Morgan Stanley Asset Management.

In 2002, Vedovotto was named CEO of the eyewear manufacturing company Safilo, a year after it was delisted from the Milan stock exchange. He was hired to clean Safilo's books and overhaul its finances. Safilo was reintroduced in the Milan stock exchange in 2005. Vedovotto left Safilo in November 2006 and became managing director and chairman of European luxury goods at Lehman Brothers. He was, again, CEO of Safilo from November 2008 to October 2013.

In 2013, Vedovotto joined Kering to pilot the development of the luxury group's eyewear division. He launched Kering Eyewear the following year, which marked the first time a global luxury group internalized its eyewear production. In March 2015, Vedovotto became a member of Kering's executive committee. In 2017, he was joined by the luxury group Richemont in the shareholding of Kering Eyewear, and then acquired the eyewear brands Lindberg in 2021 and Maui Jim in 2022.

== Distinctions ==
- 2003: Milano Fashion Global Summit award
- Since 2015: BoF 500
- 2019: Business Visionary award by The Accessories Council (ACE Awards)
