= Icicle (disambiguation) =

An icicle is a spike of ice formed when water dripping or falling from an object freezes.

Icicle may also refer to:

== Places ==
- Icicle Creek, a stream in the U.S. state of Washington
- Icicle Ridge, Washington state, U.S.
- Icicle Station, train station in Leavenworth, Washington, United States

== Sailing ==
- HMS Icicle (1814)
- Icicle (yacht)

== Popular media ==
- Icicle (comics), a comic character
- "Icicle" (Stargirl episode)

== Biology ==
- Icicle plant
- Icicle radish

== Other ==
- Icicle, Chinese luxury brand
- Icicle Reeder, American Major League Baseball player
- Icicle hitch, a knot
