= Bright Eyes =

Bright Eyes may refer to:

== Music ==
- Bright Eyes (band), an indie rock group featuring Conor Oberst
- Bright Eyes (song), 1979, performed by Art Garfunkel on the soundtrack of Watership Down
- Bright Eyes, an album by Melissa Manchester and its title track
- "Bright Eyes", a song by Blind Guardian from their 1995 album Imaginations from the Other Side

== Television, film, theater ==
- Bright Eyes (1921 film), directed by Malcolm St. Clair
- Bright Eyes (1929 film), directed by Géza von Bolváry
- Bright Eyes (1934 film), a musical comedy starring Shirley Temple
- Bright Eyes (musical), a 1910 Broadway comedy with music by Karl Hoschna
- "Bright Eyes", a 2024 episode of X-Men '97
- Taylor (Planet of the Apes), a film character nicknamed "Bright Eyes"
- Bright Eyes, an anthropomorphic puppy in the 1986 animated series Pound Puppies
- Bright Eyes, a pony in the TV series My Little Pony Tales

== Other ==
- Susette LaFlesche Tibbles (1854–1903), nicknamed "Bright Eyes", Native American activist and lecturer
- Bright Eyes Sunglasses, an Australian retailer
- Brighteyes, a common name for plants in the genus Reichardia

== See also ==
- Eyebright, a herb
