= Groupe Artémis =

French holding company

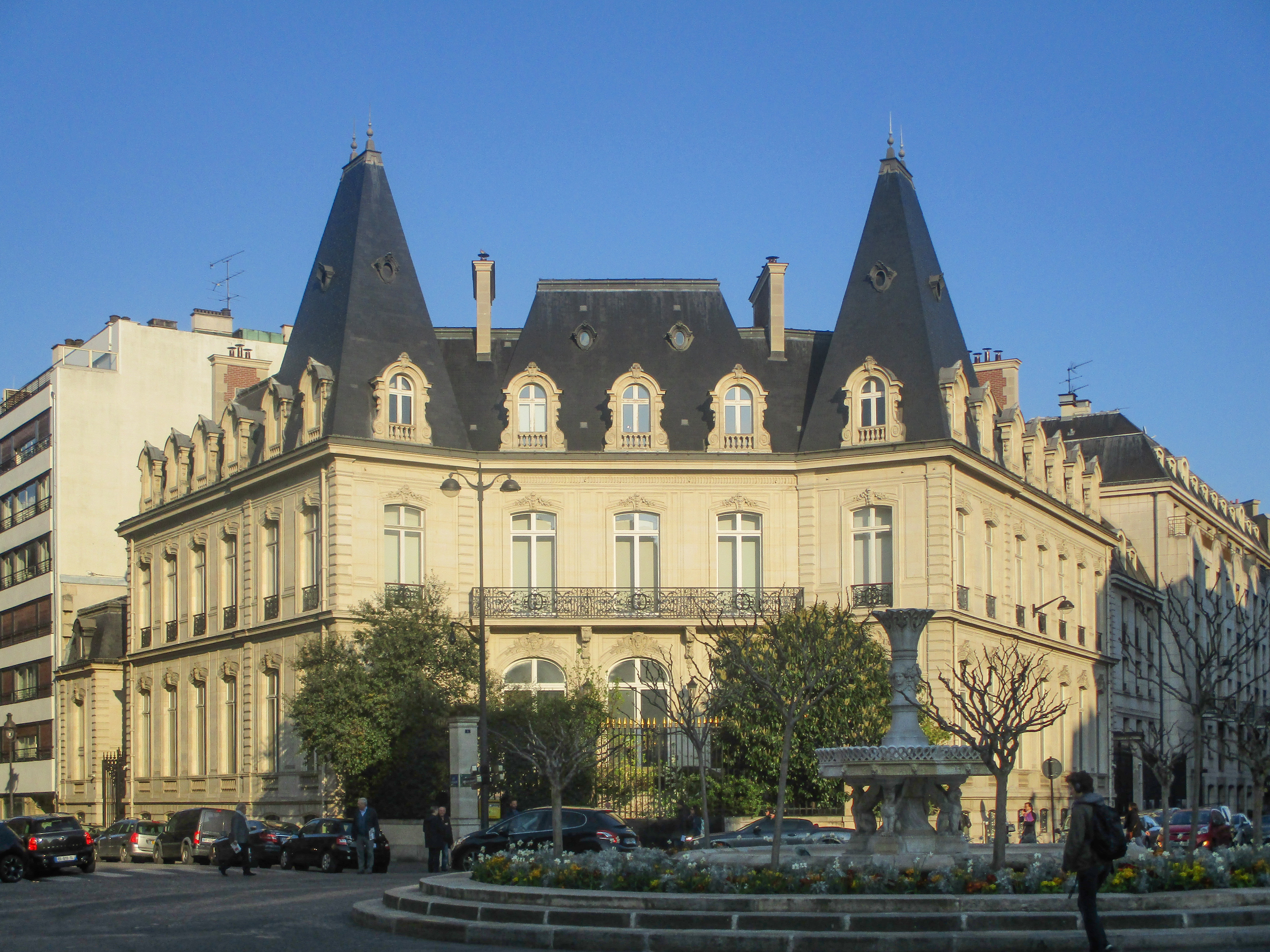
- Hôtel de Clermont-Tonnerre, Paris, headquarters of Artémis.
- Company type: Private
- Industry: holding company activities
- Founded: 1992; 34 years ago
- Founder: François Pinault
- Headquarters: Paris, France
- Key people: François-Henri Pinault; François Pinault
- Parent: Financière Pinault (100%)
- Website: www.groupeartemis.com

Groupe Artémis is a French investment holding with a portfolio in fashion (Kering), wine (Artémis Domaines including Château Latour), art (Christie's, Pinault Collection), sports (Stade Rennais FC) and entertainment (Creative Artists Agency). Headquartered in Paris, France, Groupe Artémis was founded by François Pinault in 1992.

== History ==
In 1992, the French entrepreneur François Pinault transferred his majority stake in Pinault-Printemps-Redoute (PPR, renamed Kering in 2013) to his new company, Groupe Artémis, created as a family investment vehicle. Throughout the 1990s, he engaged in a series of prestigious acquisitions.

The acquisition of Château Latour (Pauillac-Médoc) in 1993 was the first of a series under the Artémis Domaines label. Artémis Domaines was restructured in 2022 after the acquisition of Bouchard Père et Fils.

Groupe Artémis bought the news magazine Le Point in 1997, the auction house Christie's and the Ligue 1 soccer team Stade Rennais FC in 1998, and the book-publishing company Éditions Tallandier in 1999.

In May 2003, François-Henri Pinault took over the presidency of Artémis.

In 2005, Groupe Artémis acquired the Palazzo Grassi in Venice, which reopened in 2006 as the first exhibition site of Pinault Collection. Pinault Collection inaugurated the Punta della Dogana in Venice in 2009 and the Bourse de Commerce in Paris in 2021.

Artémis acquired 40.9% of Courrèges in 2014 (100% in 2018) and the luxury cruise operator Ponant in 2015. In 2017, the group launched the tech investment company Red River West and acquired the couture house Giambattista Valli. In 2018, Artémis acquired the magazine Point de vue (royal family news) and bought 29% of Puma from Kering.

In 2019, the Pinault family, through Artémis, pledged to donate 100 million euros for the reconstruction of Notre-Dame de Paris after the fire. In 2023, Artémis acquired a majority stake in the talent and sports agency Creative Artists Agency (CAA) for an estimated $7 billion, "a deal that shows the ever-growing convergence of fashion and fame" according to The New York Times.

In January 2026, the company sold its shareholding in Puma to Anta Sports for €1.5 billion. The deal is subject to regulatory approval.

== Investments ==
Groupe Artémis is headquartered in Paris, France, and is 100% owned by Financière Pinault. Its president has been François-Henri Pinault since 2003. Groupe Artémis invests in the following companies:

Sector	Company	Description
Luxury & Fashion	Kering	High-fashion luxury group
Luxury & Fashion	Puma	Sportswear and athleisure
Luxury & Fashion	Courrèges	Couture house
Luxury & Fashion	Giambattista Valli	Couture house
Art	Christie's	Auction house
Art	Pinault Collection	Art collection management company. 3 museums: Palazzo Grassi (Venice), Punta della Dogana (Venice), Bourse de Commerce (Paris)
Wine	Artémis Domaines	Château Latour (Premier Grand Cru Classé Pauillac AOC), Domaine d'Eugénie (Vosne-Romanée), Château Grillet (Condrieu AOC), 1/10 of an acre of the Grand Cru Le Montrachet (Château de Puligny-Montrachet), Eisele Vineyard (Calistoga), Clos du Tart
Tourism	Ponant	Luxury cruises
Printing press	Le Point	News magazine
Printing press	Point de vue	People and royal families news
Printing press	Éditions Tallandier	Book-publishing company
Entertainment	Creative Artists Agency	Talent and sports agency
Sports	Stade Rennais FC	Ligue 1 football club
Food	Breizh Café	Crêperie fusion Brittany-Japan
Technology	Red River West	Tech investment company

Artémis developed a portfolio of tech startups specialized in fashion (1stDibs, Goat), farming (Bowery Farming), news (Brut, Le 1), cars (Delage), music (Deezer).
