= Eisele Vineyard Estate =

Araujo Estate Wines
- Location: Calistoga, California, USA
- Appellation: Calistoga AVA
- Founded: 1990
- First vintage: 1991
- Key people: Francois Pinault, Owner; Frederic Engerer, President Artemis Domaines; Antoine Donnedieu, General Manager; Helene Mingot, Winemaker; Bart and Daphne Araujo, Founders
- Cases/yr: 4,000
- Known for: Eisele Vineyard Cabernet Sauvignon
- Varietals: Cabernet Sauvignon, Sauvignon blanc, Syrah, Viognier
- Website: http://www.araujoestate.com

Eisele Vineyard Estate (named Araujo Estate Wines until 2016) is a California winegrowing estate founded by Bart and Daphne Araujo. Located in Calistoga, California within both the Calistoga and Napa Valley AVAs, the estate produces a small portfolio of limited-production wines from the organically and Biodynamically farmed Eisele Vineyard. Eisele Vineyard is owned by Artémis Domaines.

It is widely considered to be one of California's "cult" wineries, and has been classified as a "five star" winery by the Wine Spectator writer James Laube, along with other recognition for its wines. The winery's flagship wine as of 2009 is the Araujo Cabernet Sauvignon Eisele Vineyard.

== History ==
In 1990, Bart and Daphne Araujo bought the 162-acre property in Calistoga that included the 38-acre Eisele Vineyard. The vineyard had originally been planted in the 1880s to Zinfandel and Riesling; it was first planted to Cabernet Sauvignon in 1964. Bart, who had come from a career in home building and mortgage banking, and Daphne, who had a background in landscape architecture, had been interested in acquiring an historical vineyard property. When they purchased the Eisele Vineyard from Milt and Barbara Eisele, they decided to build a winery on the property. Daphne stated "Our intent was to have a vineyard. But before we even closed escrow, Bart realized that it was important to also make the wine, to control the whole process from beginning to end." Shortly after purchasing the property, the Araujos built a barn-like winery out of redwood and dug caves into a hillside of the property.

Araujo produced its first vintage of Eisele Vineyard Cabernet Sauvignon in 1991. Since its founding, the winery has worked with some of the best-known winemakers in the industry, including Tony Soter, Mia Klein, Françoise Peschon and consultant Michel Rolland. Its Eisele Vineyard Cabernet has earned consistent acclaim in the Wine Spectator and from Wine Advocate's Robert Parker.

In 2013, Araujo Estate Wines and the Eisele Vineyard were acquired by French businessman Francois Pinault owner of Chateau Latour in Pauillac through his holding group, Artemis.

The estate's last vintage bearing the Araujo name was 2013. On the occasion of the release of the first vintage under the new ownership, Araujo Estate Wines has been renamed Eisele Vineyard Estate, putting forward the name of the iconic terroir. The first Eisele Vineyard Cabernet vintage (2013) made under the Pinault ownership received 100 points from Robert Parker, for the first time in the history of the estate.

== The Eisele Vineyard ==
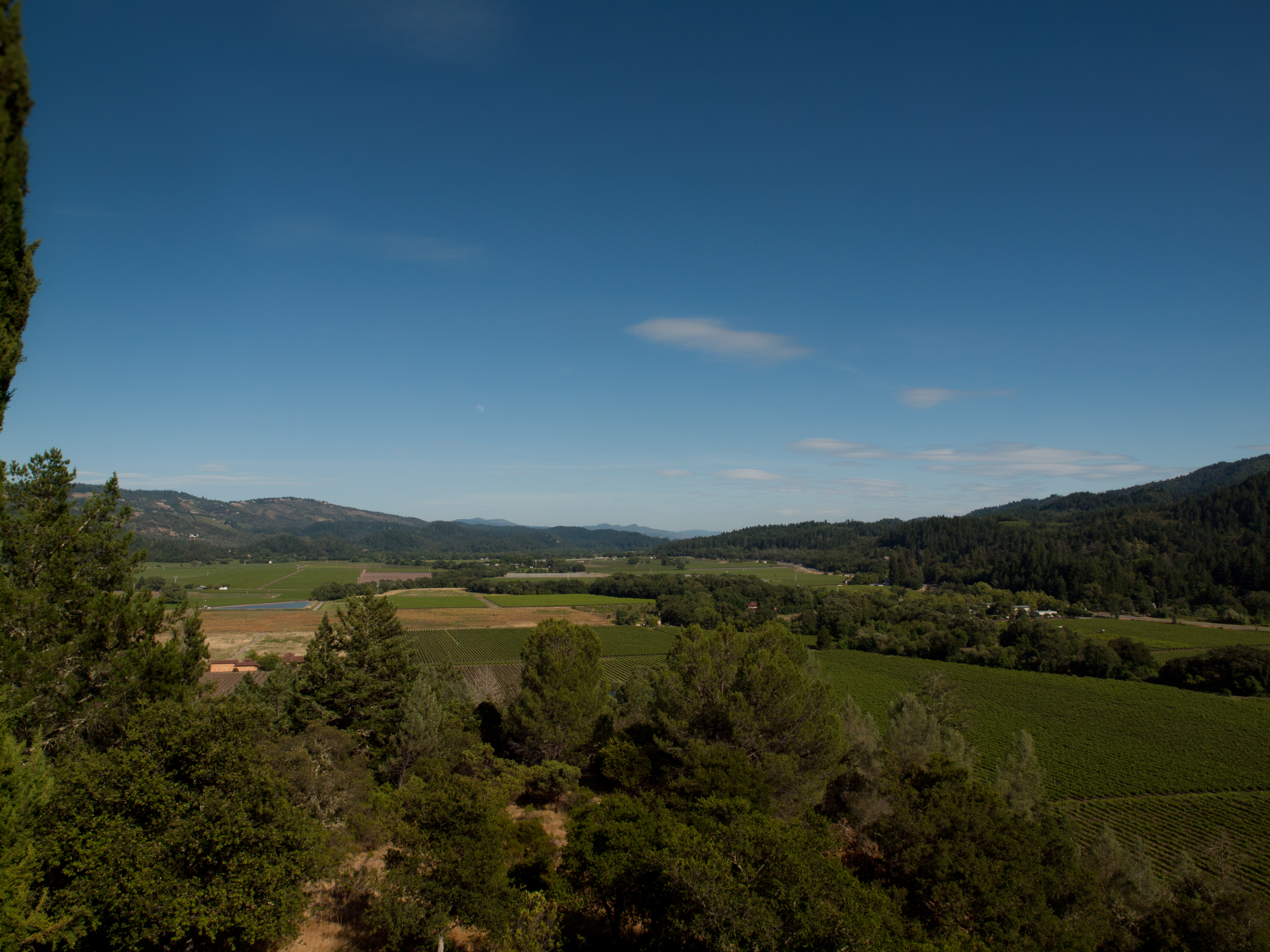
Araujo vineyards are located in the Calistoga AVA of northern Napa Valley.

Named for Milt and Barbara Eisele, who owned the vineyard prior to Bart and Daphne Araujo, the Eisele Vineyard has long been known for the quality of its Cabernet Sauvignon. Eisele provided grapes for what is thought to be the third vineyard-designated Cabernet Sauvignon in California, a 1971 from Ridge Vineyards. Joseph Phelps made a vineyard-designated bottling from Eisele Vineyard for several years starting in 1975. The vineyard is located on an alluvial fan near the northern end of Napa Valley, and features cobbly, mineral-rich soils.

The Araujos began farming the Eisele Vineyard organically in 1998. Soon they began looking into farming the vineyard biodynamically, an agricultural practice that eschews chemical inputs of any kind and coordinates the timing of farming practices around the lunar and astronomical calendar. In 2002 the vineyard was certified Biodynamic by Demeter.

== Wine Production ==
On average, Araujo produces 2,000 cases of Eisele Vineyard Cabernet Sauvignon annually. In addition, the winery also produces a second Cabernet-based wine called Altagracia as well as small quantities of estate-grown Sauvignon blanc, Syrah and Viognier.

== Reception ==
It is widely considered to be one of California's "cult" wineries, and has been classified as a "five star" winery by the Wine Spectator writer James Laube and included in Robert M. Parker, Jr.'s The World's Greatest Wine Estates: A Modern Perspective. The Eisele Vineyard was called "the object of a cult like no other among California wine lovers" in The World's Greatest Wines by Michel Bettane and Thierry Desseauve, and the winery's flagship wine, the Araujo Cabernet Sauvignon Eisele Vineyard, was listed as a "First Growth" in Fine Magazine's "Napa Valley Classification."
