= Le Point =

French weekly magazine

- Categories: News magazine
- Frequency: Weekly
- Circulation: 288,361 (2020)
- Publisher: Le Point Communication
- Founded: 1972
- First issue: 1 September 1972; 54 years ago
- Company: Groupe Artémis
- Country: France
- Based in: Paris
- Language: French
- Website: www.lepoint.fr
- ISSN: 0242-6005

Le Point (French pronunciation: [ləˈpwɛ̃]) is a French weekly political and conservative news magazine published in Paris. It is one of the three major French news magazines.

Le Point was founded in 1972 by former journalists of L'Express and quickly rose to become a major competitor. The magazine has changed ownership multiple times since its inception and is currently owned by Artémis, an investment group of billionaire businessman François Pinault.

== History and profile ==
Le Point was founded in September 1972 by a group of journalists who had, one year earlier, left the editorial team of L'Express, which was then owned by Jean-Jacques Servan-Schreiber, a député (member of parliament) of the Parti Radical, a centrist party.

The company operating Le Point, Société d'exploitation de l'hebdomadaire Le Point (SEBDO Le Point) has its head office in the 14th arrondissement of Paris. The founders focused on readers' needs, which became Le Point's ideal, published by Le Point Communication on Thursdays.

After a fairly difficult start in September 1972, the magazine quickly challenged L'Express. The editorial team of spring 1972 found financial backing with Hachette and was then directed by Claude Imbert. Other journalists making up the team were: Jacques Duquesne, Henri Trinchet, Pierre Billard, Robert Franc, and Georges Suffert. The management included Olivier Chevrillon and Philippe Ramond. It has changed ownership several times. Gaumont bought the magazine in 1981. In 1993, Generale Occidentale purchased 82.5% of publisher Sebdo, the owner of magazine Le Point from Gaumont.

In 1997 the magazine was acquired by its current owner Artémis, a French investment group founded and owned by the billionaire businessman François Pinault. In 2001, the logo and layout of Le Point was changed. The weekly recruited journalists from the Parisian press and relied on its ability to redefine the genre. It modeled itself closely on Time Magazine and Newsweek.

Franz-Olivier Giesbert was chief executive officer of Le Point from 2000 until 18 January 2014, when Etienne Gernelle replaced him. Giesbert, however, remained an adviser to the magazine and continued to write editorials and articles. It publishes a list regarding the reputation of companies, Baromètre d’Image des Grandes Entreprises.

In February 2025, Erwan Seznec, a journalist working for Le Point, allegedly wrote to a French Wikipedia editor that his employer would publish an article revealing their personal information over a dispute with content the editor had added to the magazine's French Wikipedia article. The editor added content which described Le Point as "populist" and "increasingly close to the right-wing Identitarian movement". Seznec denied accusations that he had made doxing threats, saying he had merely asked for corrections. Le Point backed and defended Seznec, describing the edits and accusations as a "series of malicious acts" and the sources cited for the edits as unreliable.

== Editorial stance ==
Le Point has a conservative, right stance without any party affiliation.

== Circulation ==
Le Point had a circulation of 336,000 copies in 1981. It was 311,000 copies in 1987 and 320,000 copies in 1988.

In 2001 Le Point had a circulation of 303,000 copies. During the 2007-2008 period its circulation was 419,000 copies. In 2009 the circulation of the magazine was 435,000 copies. Its circulation in 2011 was 428,114 copies. The 2013 circulation of the magazine was 417,062 copies. The 2020 circulation of the magazine was 288,361 copies.

Year	Circulation
2006	408,931
2007	443,956
2008	443,738
2009	434,745
2010	429,650
2011	430,086
2012	432,813
2013	417,940
2014	401,171
2015	380,222
2016	355,586
2017	330,602
2018	301,722
2019	292,795
2020	279,032

== See also ==
- Le Nouvel Observateur – general information French newsmagazine
- L'Express – conservative newsmagazine, owned by Belgian group Roularta
- Valeurs Actuelles
