= Qeelin =

Hong Kong-based fine jewellery company

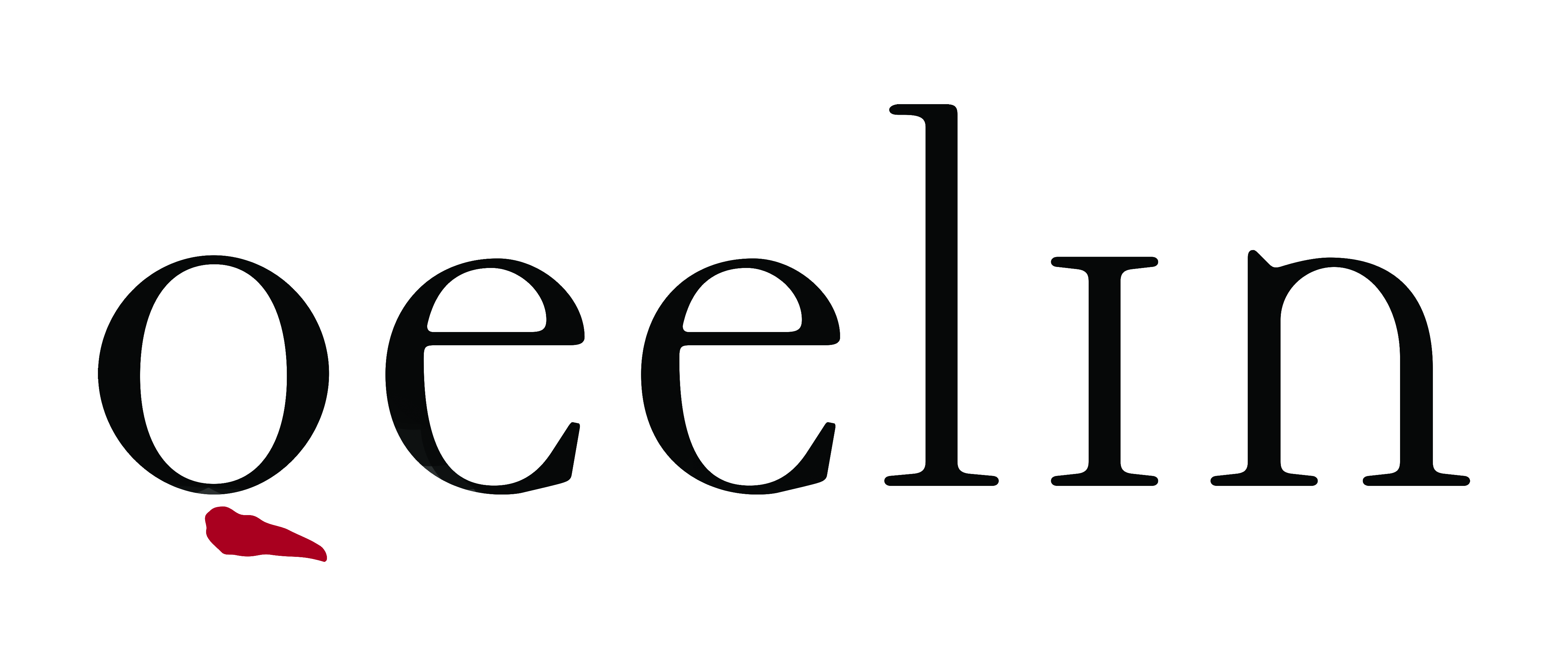
- Founded: 2004
- Founder: Dennis Chan; Guillaume Brochard
- Headquarters: Hong Kong SAR, China
- Area served: Worldwide
- Key people: Dennis Chan (Creative Director); Christophe Artaux (CEO)
- Products: Jewellery and accessories
- Parent: Kering
- Website: Qeelin.com

Qeelin is a fine jewellery company established in 2004 in Hong Kong by Dennis Chan and Guillaume Brochard. The brand's products refer to mystical or superstitious symbols strongly embedded in Chinese culture. The name Qeelin comes from the qilin, (麒麟) a legendary hooved chimerical creature that appears in Chinese mythology.

The company is headquartered in Hong-Kong, and is owned by the French luxury group Kering. Christophe Artaux has been CEO since 2015, and Dennis Chan creative director since 2004.

== History ==
=== Launch in Paris ===
The idea of creating a luxury brand strongly embedded in the Chinese culture came to the designer Dennis Chan while visiting the Dunhuang Caves along the Silk Road in 1997. He co-founded with Guillaume Brochard the luxury jewellery company Qeelin in 2004 in Paris. Qeelin's first collection, the Wulu, became a hit after actress Maggie Cheung wore it at the 2004 Cannes Film Festival.

In 2009, Qeelin opened its first store in Paris, inside the Palais-Royal.

=== Acquisition by Kering ===
In January 2013, the French luxury group Kering acquired a majority stake in Qeelin, the group's first acquisition in China. By then, Qeelin had 50 employees and 14 stores worldwide.

The acquisition enabled Qeelin to accelerate store openings (7 new stores in the first year), and to launch its first high jewelry collection. In 2015, Guillaume Brochard left the company, and Christophe Artaux became the CEO of Qeelin.

=== Timeline ===
- 2004: Launch in Paris.
- 2004: Qeelin gained worldwide publicity when actress Maggie Cheung wore the Wulu during the 2004 Cannes Film Festival.
- 2009: Parisian store opened in Palais-Royal.
- 2013: Qeelin was acquired by Kering.
- 2015: Qeelin started distribution in the USA.
- 2018: Chinese actress Gulnazar became Qeelin's brand ambassador.
- 2019: Chinese Actor Xiao Zhan became brand ambassador.
- 2020: Chinese actress Liu Shishi became Qeelin's brand spokesperson.
- 2020: Chinese actor Chen Feiyu became Qeelin's Millennial ambassador.
- 2022: Chinese actor Liu Haoran became Qeelin's brand spokesperson.
- 2023: Korean singer and actress Im Yoon-ah was the first South Korean artist to become Qeelin's brand spokesperson.
- 2023: Chinese actress Liu Shishi became Qeelin's Global brand spokesperson.
- 2024: Chinese singer and actor Lay Zhang became Qeelin's Global brand spokesperson.
- 2024: Korean singer and actress Im Yoon-ah was the first South Korean artist to become Qeelin's Global brand spokesperson.

== Designs ==
The company's first collection was the Wulu, which revisited the legendary Chinese gourd, an auspicious emblem in Chinese tradition. Often inspired by mythical or superstitious myths, Qeelin's following creations used the symbols of the panda (Bo Bo), bells (Ling Long), kissing goldfish (Qin Qin), and dogs (Wang Wang).

In 2009, Qeelin launched a line of rare jadeite jewels. In 2010, Qeelin launched Maggie's bangles, a set of bracelets initially worn by Maggie Cheung. In 2012, Qeelin launched the XiXi collection to celebrate the Lion in the Chinese culture. In 2016, Qeelin collaborated with Chinese visual artist Chen Man to design a limited edition of the Bo Bo pendant. In 2017, Qeelin released 8 rooster designs to celebrate the Year of the Rooster in the Chinese zodiac.

== Retailing ==
=== Activities ===
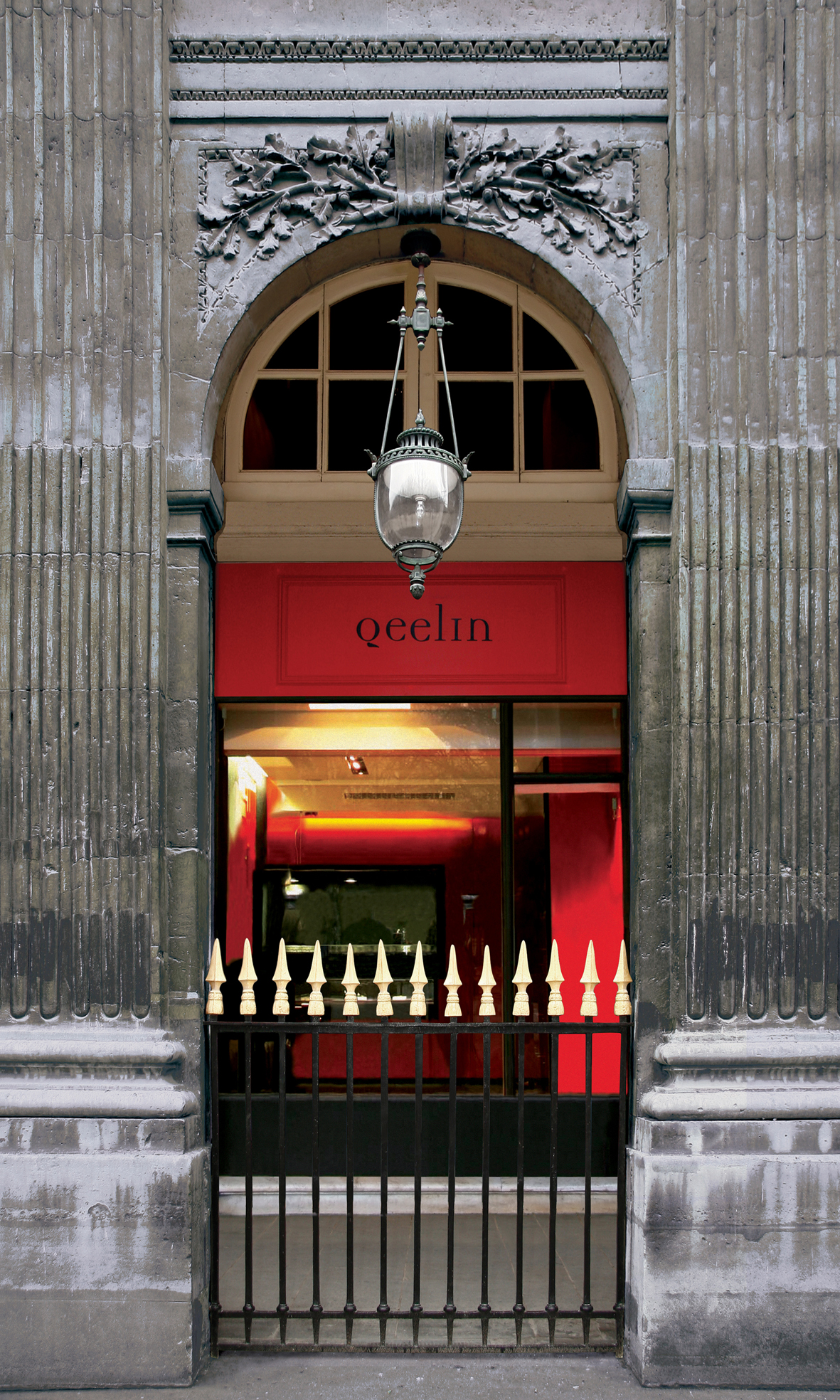
Qeelin Boutique in the Palais-Royal in Paris.

Qeelin is a Chinese fine jewellery company whose products refer to mystical or superstitious symbols strongly embedded in the Chinese culture. Qeelin uses meticulous craftsmanship to create its China-inspired jewellery, and nurtures a «East meets West» philosophy to appeal to an international audience. Qeelin is based in Hong Kong SAR and owned by the French luxury group Kering.

Qeelin opened its first store in Taiwan in 2009, and its first store in Shanghai in 2010. In June 2014, the company announced its intention to double in 2 years the number of Qeelin stores in China to 24.

In 2015, Qeelin started to retail its products in the USA through a handful of stores, initially to cater to the Chinese diaspora in North America.

In 2017, Qeelin opened its first store in Thailand.

In 2018, Qeelin chose Chinese actress Gulnazar to become its new brand ambassador.

=== Retail stores ===
As of 2024 Qeelin operates 139 stores on the world and 66 in China.

Some of those stores include:

- Paris (France), Palais-Royal and Place Vendôme
- Hong Kong (China), The Peninsula Hotel
- Beijing (China), Wangfu Central
- Macau SAR (China), The Venetian Macao
- Toronto (Canada), Yorkdale shopping center, Holt Renfrew
- Calgary (Canada), Maison Birks
- New York (US), Carat & Co
- Bangkok (Thailand), Sette

== Governance ==
=== CEOs ===
- 2004-2015: Guillaume Brochard
- Since 2015 Christophe Artaux

=== Creative directors ===
- Since 2004: Dennis Chan

== See also ==
- Kering
- Qilin
- Chinese culture
