= Lindberg (eyewear) =

Danish eyewear company

- Type: Subsidiary
- Industry: Eyewear
- Founded: 1983
- Founders: Poul-Jørn Lindberg; Hanne Lindberg
- Headquarters: Aarhus, Denmark
- Area served: Worldwide
- Key people: Henrik Lindberg (CEO)
- Products: Eyewear; Glasses frames Sunglasses
- Revenue: 70 million DKK profit (2010)
- Number of employees: 500 (2010)
- Parent: Kering Eyewear
- Website: lindberg.com

Lindberg is a Danish company which designs, produces and distributes luxury eyewear such as spectacle frames glasses and sunglasses.

== History ==
Lindberg was founded in 1983 by the couple Poul-Jørn and Hanne Lindberg. In 1986, it collaborated with architect Hans Dissing to create an innovative style of frame made from titanium wire, which launched the company and has won several design awards.

In 2000, Poul-Jørn and Hanne Lindberg retired and left their two children in charge of the family business.

In 2010, the Lindberg company had 500 employees, a distribution in 90 countries, and an annual profit of 70 million DKK. The Lindberg's family fortune was estimated around 700 million DKK. According to Poul-Jørn Lindberg, Pope Benedict XVI and Margrethe II wore Lindberg glasses. In 2014, French President François Hollande switched from heavy-frame glasses to light-frame Lindberg glasses.

In July 2021, the eyewear division of luxury group Kering (Kering Eyewear/Vedovotto) acquired 100% of Lindberg, a deal cleared by antitrust authorities in October 2021.
