= ICCF Group =

ICCF Group is the parent company of ICICLE and Carven. Kering has invested in a minority holding. ICCF Group operates a dual-headquarters strategy between Shanghai and Paris. Its name is an initialism referring to “Icicle Carven China France”.

ICICLE is a Chinese high-end fashion brand founded in Shanghai in 1997 by husband-and-wife duo Ye Shouzeng and Tao Xiaoma (Shawna Tao). It has evolved into one of China’s homegrown "eco-luxury" labels, known for its minimalist aesthetic and strict focus on sustainability. In 2018 ICICLE acquired the historic French fashion house Carven for €6.5 million after Carven had filed for bankruptcy protection. In 2026, ICICLE appointed Sabato De Sarno as Creative Director, presenting his first collection for the fall 2027 season.
