= Les Champs-Géraux =

Les Champs-Géraux Maez-Geraod
- Commune
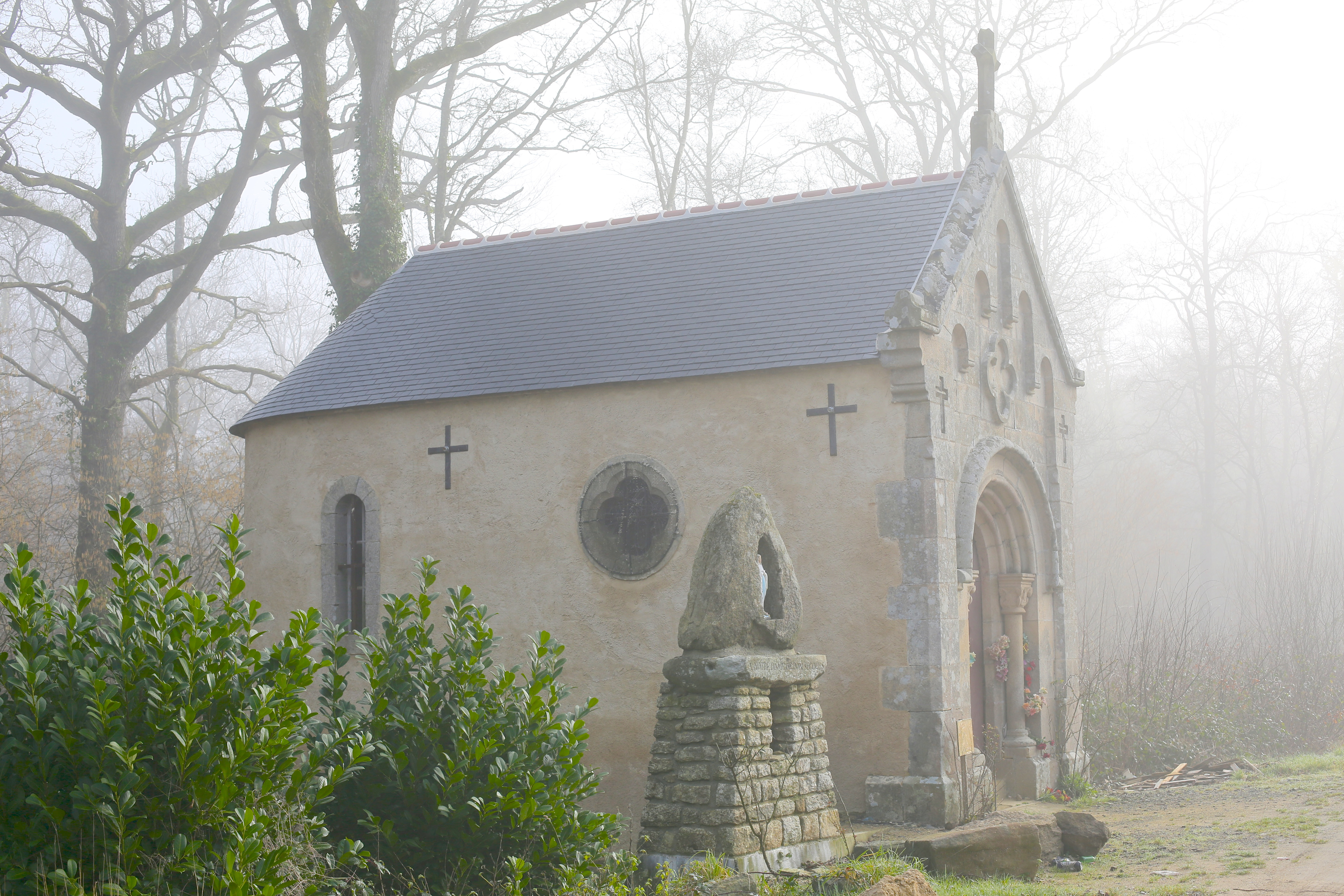
- Chapel of Notre-Dame of Bonsecours

- Coat of arms
- Location of Les Champs-Géraux
- Location within France Location within Brittany
- Coordinates: 48°25′03″N 1°58′09″W
- Country: France
- Region: Brittany
- Department: Côtes-d'Armor
- Arrondissement: Dinan
- Canton: Lanvallay
- Intercommunality: Dinan Agglomération

Government
  - Mayor (2023–2026): Sandrine Juhel
- Area^{1}: 19.09 km^{2} (7.37 sq mi)
- Highest elevation: 97 m (318 ft)
- Lowest elevation: 7 m (23 ft)
- Population (2023): 1,054
  - Density: 55.21/km^{2} (143.0/sq mi)
- Time zone: UTC+01:00 (CET)
  - Summer (DST): UTC+02:00 (CEST)
- INSEE/Postal code: 22035 /22630
- ^{1} French Land Register data, which excludes lakes, ponds, glaciers > 1 km^{2} (0.386 sq mi or 247 acres) and river estuaries.

Les Champs-Géraux (French pronunciation: [le ʃɑ̃ ʒeʁo]; Breton: Maez-Geraod; Gallo: Lez Chaunt-Jéraud) is a commune in the Côtes-d'Armor department of Brittany in northwestern France.

== Population ==
Historical population
Year	Pop.	±% p.a.
1968	943	—
1975	934	−0.14%
1982	961	+0.41%
1990	943	−0.24%
1999	960	+0.20%
2007	1,015	+0.70%
2012	1,045	+0.58%
2017	1,036	−0.17%
2023	1,054	+0.29%
Source: INSEE

Inhabitants of Les Champs-Géraux are called Campogérosiens in French.

== See also ==
- Communes of the Côtes-d'Armor department
