= Maui Jim =

Sunglasses company

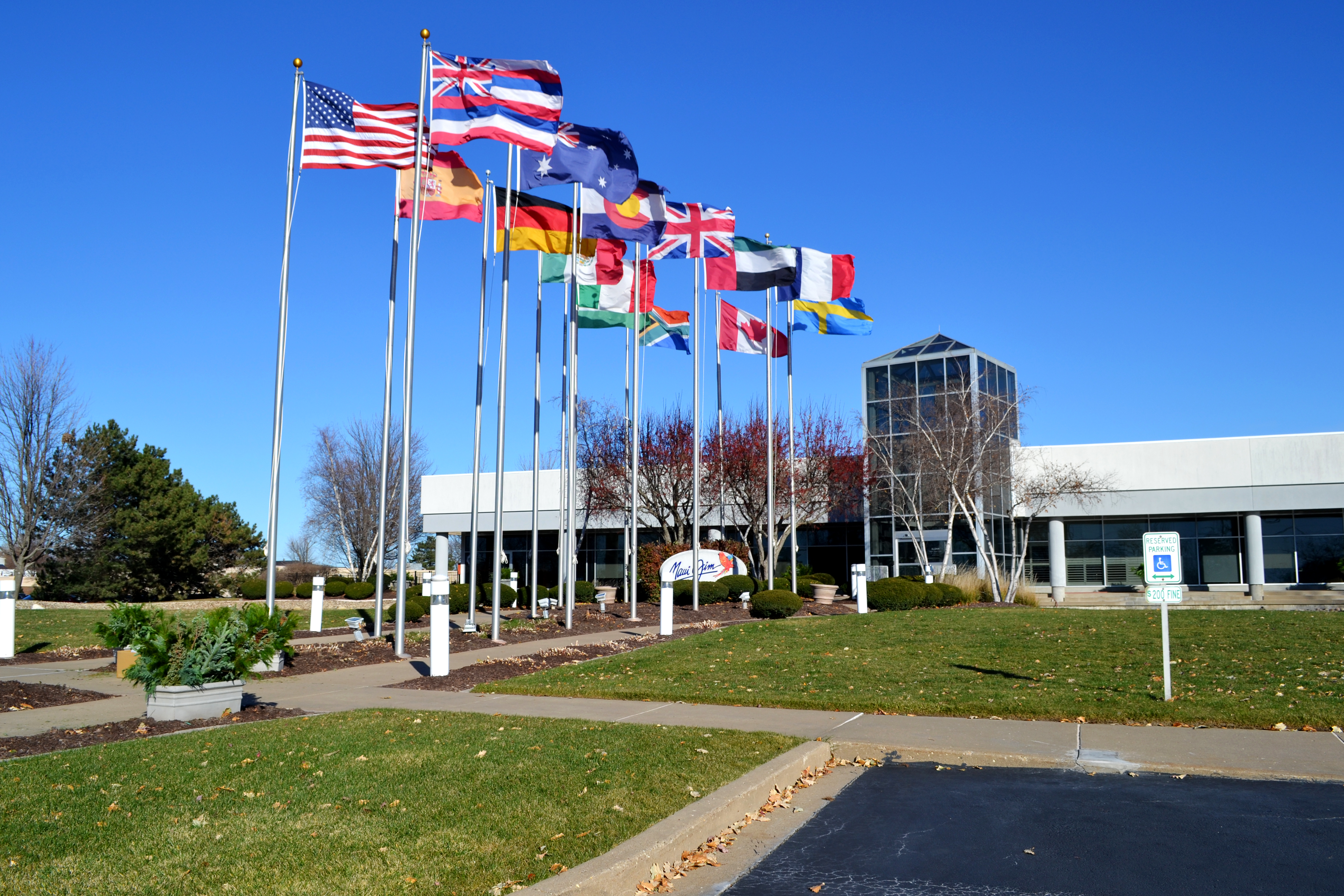
- Headquarters in Peoria, Illinois
- Type: Privately held company
- Industry: Fashion, manufacturing
- Founded: Lahaina, Hawaii, U.S. (1980)
- Founder: Jim Richards
- Headquarters: Peoria, Illinois, U.S.
- Key people: Roberto Vedovotto (President, CEO)
- Products: Sunglasses, eyewear, apparel
- Owner: Kering (2022-present)
- Website: mauijim.com

Maui Jim is an American sunglasses manufacturer based in Peoria, Illinois.

Founded in Lahaina, Hawaii, in 1980, the company designs, develops, and manufactures a wide variety of sunglasses marketed under the eponymous brand name. As of 2015, it was the third-largest producer of sunglasses in the world.

In October 2022, Maui Jim was acquired by Kering.

== History ==
The company's roots began in 1980 when a fisherman began selling sunglasses on the beaches of Maui, Hawaii. He was known as the original "Maui Jim". Several years later, the company developed polarized sunglasses to protect eyes from glare and ultraviolet rays.

In 1991, Walter Hester, a boat captain, purchased the company and built the brand to what it is today. He named the company Hester Enterprises, Inc.

In 1994, Illinois-based RLI Vision became the mainland distributor for the company, then called Maui Jim Sunglasses.

In 1996, Maui Jim Sunglasses bought RLI Vision from its parent company, Peoria, Illinois-based RLI Corp., and named the new combined entity Maui Jim Inc. The transaction was structured such that RLI Corp became a major shareholder in Maui Jim, and the company moved its headquarters to Peoria. The company kept an office in Maui.

In 2004, the company opened a distribution center in Braunschweig, Germany, a location that eventually became its European headquarters.

In June 2006, the company opened its first prescription lab in Peoria, IL.

In 2011, the company bought Zeal Optics, a Boulder, Colorado-based designer and manufacturer of action-sport polarized goggles and sunglasses.

By 2015, the company had approximately 500 employees. Also in 2015, the company became the title sponsor of college basketball's Maui Invitational Tournament.

In March 2018, the company started selling optical eyeglasses. In July, the company opened its first prescription lab outside of Peoria, located at its European headquarters in Braunschweig.

In March 2022, it was announced the company had been acquired by Kering Eyewear. RLI sold their remaining shares in Maui Jim in 2022. The acquisition was completed in October 2022.

== Locations ==
Besides its Peoria headquarters, Maui Jim maintains an office and store front in Lahaina, Hawaii, a Canadian office in Mississauga, Ontario, and a European headquarters in Braunschweig, Germany.

== Sponsorships ==
The company sponsors college basketball's Maui Invitational Tournament, called the Maui Jim Maui Invitational. The company also sponsors the Australian Sailing Team, professional marathoner Meb Keflezighi, golfer Ernie Els, and kiteboarder Dave Shah, who are brand ambassadors.

In 2021, Maui Jim became the official eyewear partner/sponsor to an American-based Formula One team, Haas F1 Team.

In 2025, Maui Jim became the official eyewear for the Red Bull Racing F1 team in a multi-year sponsorship agreement.
