= Pomellato =

Italian jewelry company

Coordinates: 45.4332192°N 9.17921°E

- Type: Subsidiary
- Industry: Retail
- Founded: 1967; 59 years ago
- Founder: Pino Rabolini
- Headquarters: Milan, Italy
- Key people: Sabina Belli (CEO); Vincenzo Castaldo (Creative Director)
- Products: jewellery
- Parent: Kering
- Website: www.pomellato.com

Pomellato is an Italian jewelry company. The brand was founded by Pino Rabolini in Milan in 1967. In 2013, the brand became a part of the luxury group Kering. Sabina Belli has been CEO of Pomellato since 2015, and Vincenzo Castaldo creative director since 2004.

== History ==
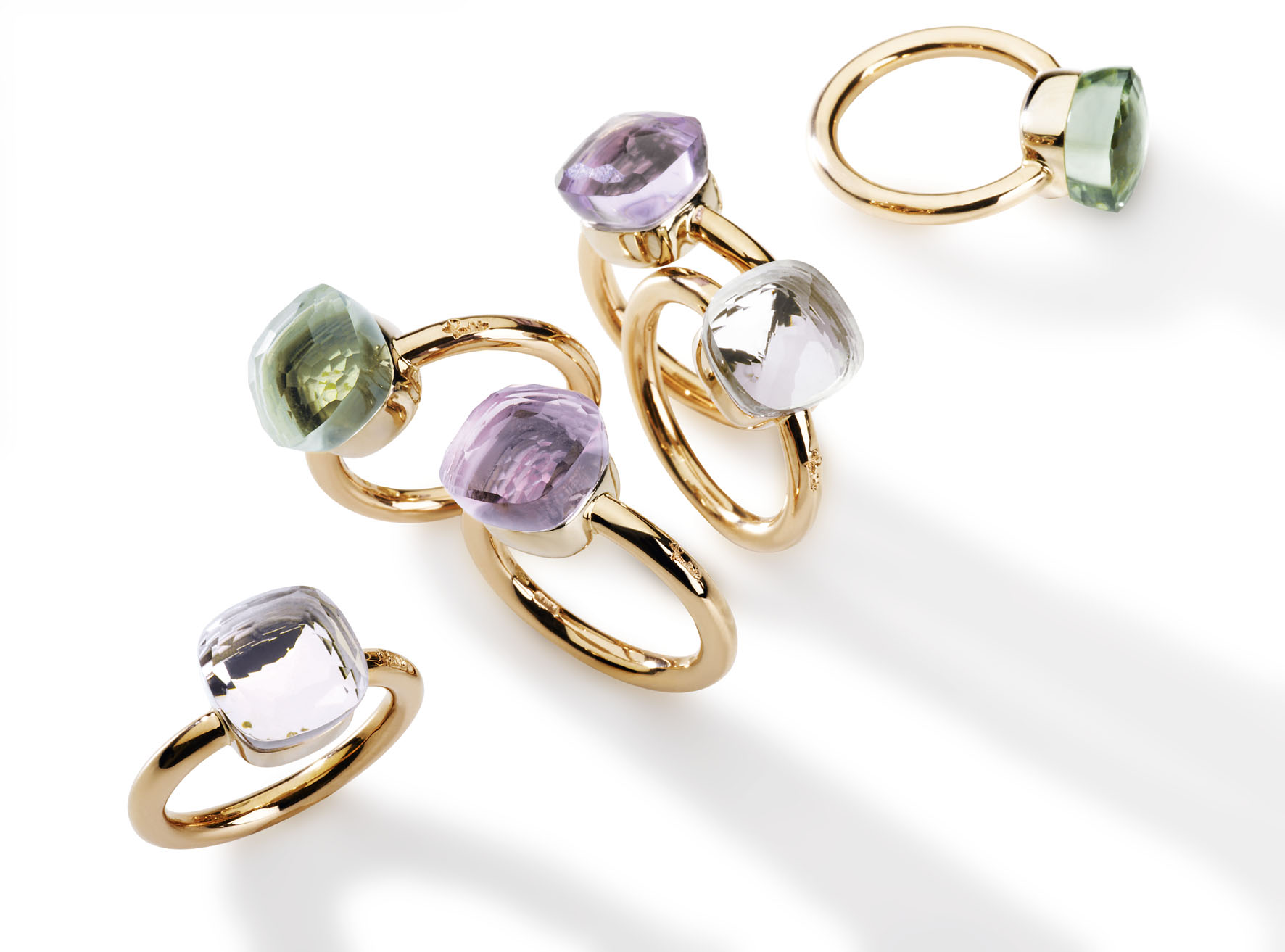
Nudo Rings

Pomellato began operating in 1967, introducing the concept of prêt-à-porter jewellery, the idea that jewellery is not just a status symbol but an accessory to be worn at any moment of the day and changed like clothes. In the 1980s the advertising campaigns for the jewellery brand generated global attention, one was photographed by Helmut Newton.

In the 1990s, Pomellato particularly focused on using colored stones. The company has also made its mark in producing chains. In 2007, to celebrate its 40th year, Pomellato made its debut in high-end jewellery with the launch of the Pom Pom collection: 40 pieces sold by appointment in New York, Paris, Milan and Monte Carlo.

Vincenzo Castaldo was named creative director in 2004. In October 2009, Andrea Morante became the new chief executive officer of the group and minority shareholder of RA.MO, the holding company of the Rabolini family that controlled Pomellato and Dodo.

In July 2013, Kering acquired Pomellato. Sabina Belli was appointed CEO of Pomellato group in December 2015.

In 2017, Pomellato launched Pomellato for Women, a platform advocating gender equality and raising awareness against violence against women.

== Famous collections ==
Nudo, Capri, Sabbia, M'Ama Non M'Ama, Iconica, Victoria, Tango.

== International expansion ==
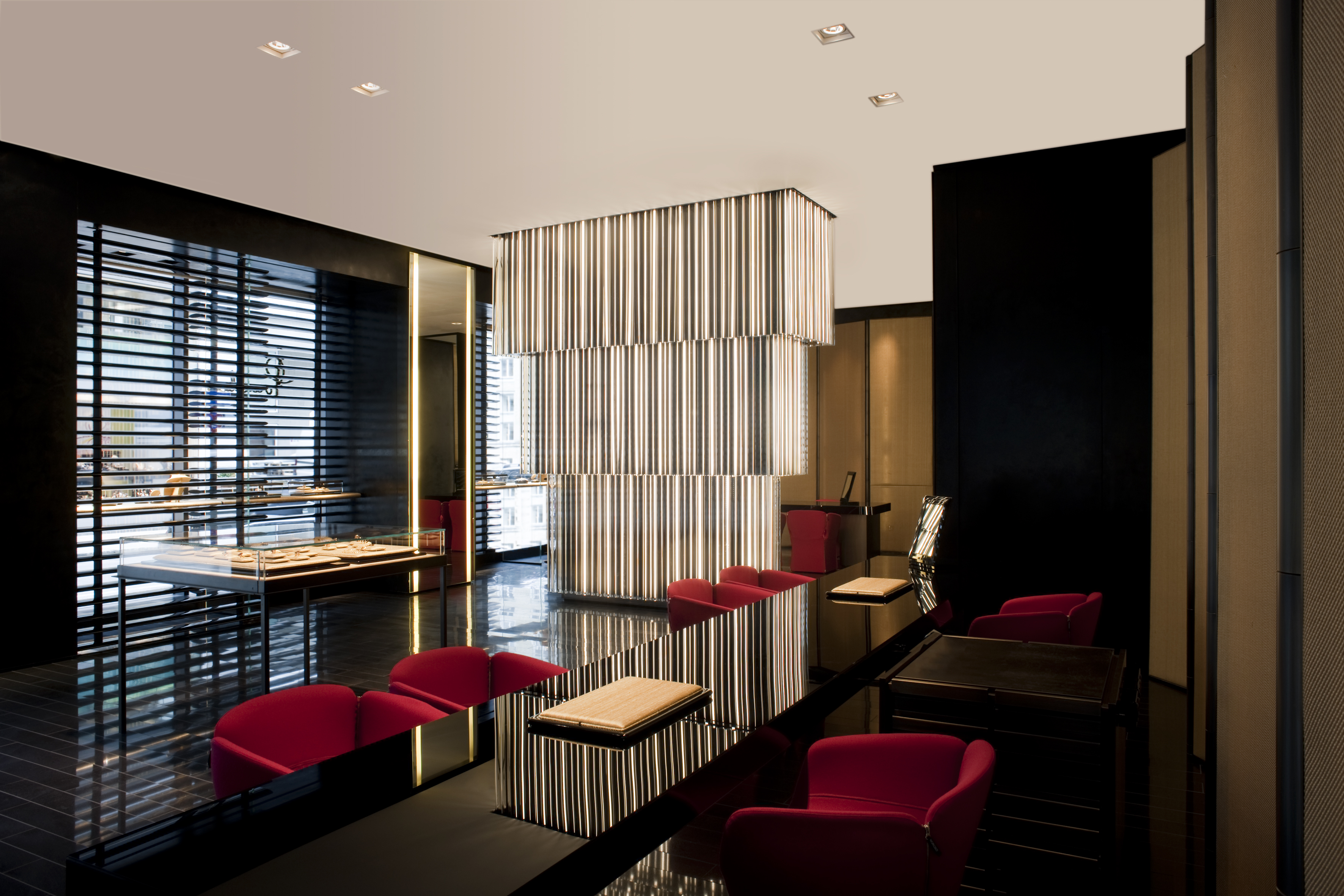
Pomellato Boutique

Pomellato has more than thirty boutiques worldwide in Milan, Paris, Madrid, Capri, Barcelona, Monte Carlo, Venice, Rome, Singapore, Moscow, Düsseldorf, Verona, Florence, Antwerp, Dubai, New York City, Turin, Kuwait, Moscow, London, Miami, Munich, Jeddah, Hamburg, Chicago, Beijing, Beirut, Los Angeles, Hong Kong, Lusail and Seoul.

== Design characteristics ==
Pomellato jewels have very recognisable features: the emphasis on rounded and tactile forms. The pavé given an irregular, random style by using gemstones of various sizes and/or colours. Openwork, also on jet.

== Dodo ==
In 1995, Pomellato launched a second brand, Dodo. The name Dodo was chosen as an extinct species exemplifying the need to protect nature.

== Communication ==
The Pomellato campaigns of the 1960s were entrusted to Franco Scheichenbauer. In 1971, Pomellato started working with the master of black-and-white photography, Gian Paolo Barbieri. From 1982 to 1984, Pomellato campaigns were signed by the photographer Helmut Newton. Gian Paolo Barbieri returned in 1988 and 1989, in charge of traditional advertising campaigns and also broader projects like the books “The Maps of Desire”, 1989 and the more recent “Innatural” of 2004, where the jewellery was photographed in tropical settings. The 1990s saw a succession of photographers like Alistair Taylor-Young, Lord Snowdon and Javier Vallhonrat. In 2001, Pomellato departed from black-and-white photography to embrace colour with the work of Michel Comte. After Paolo Roversi, author of the 2010 campaign, 2011 saw the comeback of Javier Vallhonrat, portraying the Pomellato's celebrity spokeswoman, Tilda Swinton, in the campaign of the maison.

=== The Kabul project ===
In the two-year period 1994–1995, Pomellato sponsored a charity project: “Shots”, a gallery of portraits by Michel Comte involving dozens of celebrities in the movie and fashion worlds, who donated the Pomellato jewel worn for charity purposes to support a project for building a hospital in Kabul. This project saw the participation of Geraldine Chaplin, Claudia Cardinale, Isabella Rossellini, Antonio Banderas, Boy George, Salma Hayek, Monica Bellucci and many others. The very special patroness of the auction “Bijoux et portraits de star” was Catherine Deneuve.

== Curiosities ==
The name Pomellato is taken from the image of a small horse head that featured on the corporate hallmark used in the atelier.

== Governance ==
=== CEOs ===
- Since 2015: Sabina Belli

=== Creative directors ===
- Since 2004: Vincenzo Castaldo
