= Brioni (brand) =

Italian fashion house

Coordinates: 41.9040134°N 12.4943797°E

- Type: Subsidiary
- Industry: Luxury
- Founded: 1945; 81 years ago
- Founder: Nazareno Fonticoli; Gaetano Savini
- Headquarters: Rome, Italy
- Number of locations: 58 stores worldwide (2025)
- Key people: Federico Arrigoni (CEO); Norbert Stumpfl (Creative Director)
- Products: Italian suits
- Owner: Kering
- Website: www.brioni.com

Brioni is an Italian menswear luxury fashion house based in Rome and specialised in sartorial ready-to-wear, leather goods, shoes, eyewear and fragrance, and provides a tailor-made service.

Brioni was founded in Rome in 1945. In 1952, the brand organised the first menswear runway show in the modern history of fashion. The brand invented the trunk show and the Prêt Couture. Brioni opened the tailoring school Scuola di Alta Sartoria in Penne, Italia, in 1985. Brioni was acquired by the luxury group Kering in 2011. Federico Arrigoni is the CEO of Brioni since May 2025, and Norbert Stumpfl the creative director since October 2018.

The company registered the image of a polo player as its logo in 1952, over a decade before Polo Ralph Lauren began using a variation of the symbol.

== History ==
=== Peacock Revolution ===
The first Brioni store, a tailor menswear boutique, was established on Via Barberini 79 in Rome in 1945 by Nazareno Fonticoli and Gaetano Savini. The name Brioni is a reference to the Croatian Brijuni Islands, the summer residence of Yugoslav president Josip Broz Tito, later converted into a national park.

Brioni was the first tailor for menswear to use bold colors and lighter material, introducing new silhouettes using slimmer shapes with natural shoulders. In 1952, Brioni staged the first menswear fashion show in the modern history of fashion, inside the Sala Bianca at Palazzo Pitti in Florence, where the Peacock Revolution was introduced. Brioni also invented the trunk show, during which the collections were presented directly in stores, allowing customers to personalize the garments with the Su Misura service (made-to-measure). Brioni promoted the “total look”, manufacturing suits, hats, ties, shirts and shoes. In 1959, a production plant was opened in Penne, Abruzzo, birth town of Nazareno Fonticoli. Called Brioni Roman Style, the state-of-the-art factory introduced the concept of Prêt Couture, or ready-to-wear Haute Couture that sealed the international rise of the brand.

During the 1950s, Brioni organized fashion shows in 9 US cities which launched the distribution of the brand in the USA. Brioni raised interests from celebrities, heads of state and business leaders. American movie stars of the 1950s such as Clark Gable, John Wayne and Cary Grant wore Brioni suits in Hollywood, giving international exposure to the brand. In 1959, Brioni launched a production plant, the Brioni Roman Style in Penne, which introduced the concept of Prêt Couture that also precipitated the international rise of the brand.

=== Expansion ===
In 1985, the company opened a tailoring school in Penne with the aim of transmitting to younger generations the specific Brioni sartorial method. The same year, Brioni opened a store in New York's Fisher Building on 52nd Street.

In 1990, Umberto Angeloni was appointed CEO of Brioni. He embarked the company in a diversification of its product lines, from sportswear to womenswear (Lady Brioni) and accessories. Between 1995 and 2001, the company's revenue grew threefold to 150 million dollars. In 2007, Brioni tied a partnership with the Royal College of Art in London to train master tailors through a 3-year program (the partnership ended in 2019).

In 2006, Angeloni was replaced by three joint CEOs: Antonella de Simone, Andrea Perrone, and Antonio Bianchini. In June 2007, Angeloni and his wife sold their 17% share in the company. In 2009, Brioni was hit by the economic crisis but refused to relocate its manufacturing outside of Italy. Instead, the brand released new categories of products with new fabrics and introduced a men's scent, the brand's first foray into fragrances since the release of the 1958 Good Luck fragrance. Andrea Perrone took over as CEO and appointed Alessandro Dell'Acqua as creative director of womenswear in May 2010, but the brand discontinued its women's line the following year.

=== Kering acquisition ===
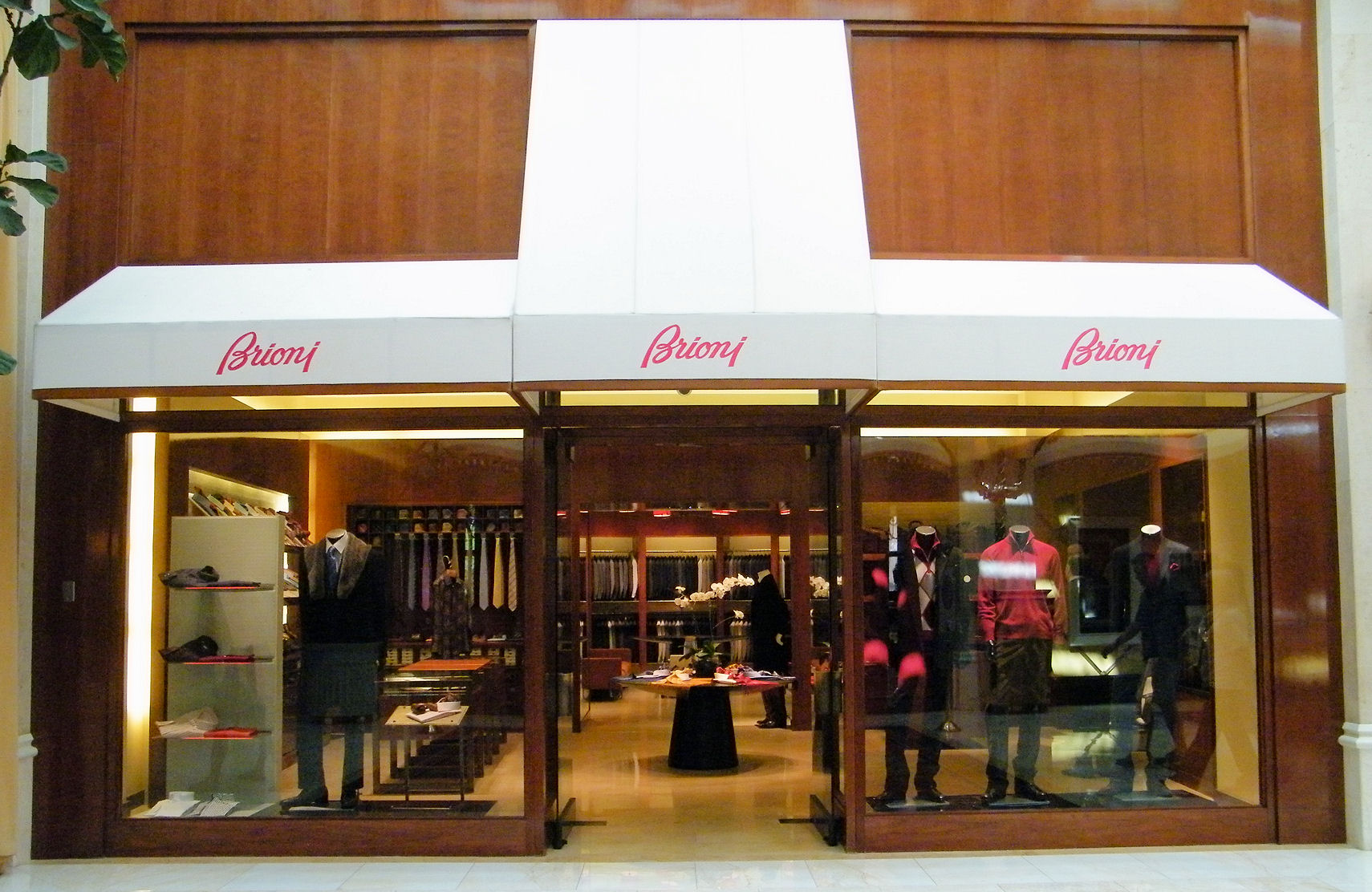
A Brioni boutique at Wynn Las Vegas

In 2011, Brioni was acquired by the French luxury group PPR (renamed Kering in 2013). For the past decade, the brand had been struggling to redefine itself, the influence of streetwear and casual office wear was driving the younger clientele away from the traditional suits tailored by Brioni. Francesco Pesci, an employee of the company since 1994, acted as CEO of Brioni during the transition. In July 2012, Brendan Mullane was appointed creative director of Brioni. Mulllane experimented with silk, hand-painted fabrics, and kimono-belted suits in his collections. Brioni launched its first fragrance in collaboration with Firmenich in 2014.

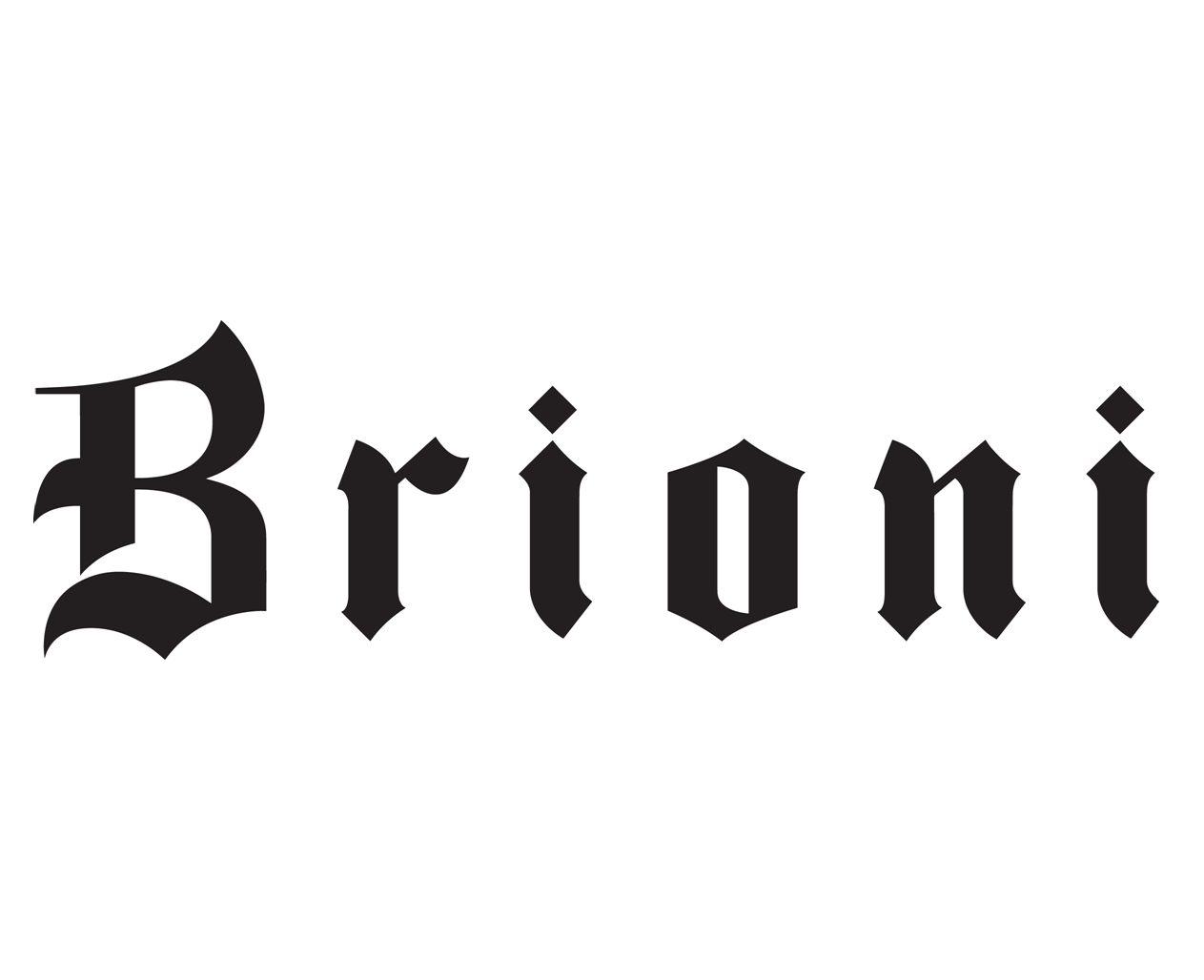
Justin O'Shea changed the brand's logo to a custom gothic font. Brioni later reverted to its original logo.

In November 2014, Gianluca Flore took over as CEO of the brand. In March 2016, Justin O’Shea was appointed creative director of Brioni. O'Shea looked for a reinvention of the brand by appealing to new customers, featuring stronger shoulders, smaller waist and longer jackets. On March 23, 2016, luxury conglomerate Kering announced that it had appointed Justin O’Shea, a heavily tattooed Australian and street-style enthusiast, as creative director. O’Shea was formerly the fashion director of the German e-commerce site MyTheresa. O’Shea featured the four members of Metallica dressed in Brioni tuxedos in his first ad campaign with the brand. The remake of Brioni's logo under O'Shea has been compared to the Fraktur typeface. O'Shea showed his first collection for the house on 4 July 2016. After 6 months, Brioni announced that O'Shea would leave the brand. Brioni reported that its Autumn/Winter 2017 collection would be presented to buyers in the Milan showroom from mid-November 2016 but would not have a corresponding runway show. In March 2017, Fabrizio Malverdi became the new CEO of Brioni, and appointed Nina-Maria Nitsche as creative director in June 2017, who was credited for revitalizing Brioni. The Primo suit was introduced, a contemporary interpretation of the brand's tailoring. In July 2018, Nina-Maria Nitsche exited Brioni, her style being described as elegant yet "too safe".

In October 2018, Austrian designer Norbert Stumpfl was appointed Design Director of Brioni. Stumpfl introduced a more tonal suit design with enhanced sumptuous fabrics. Cashmere, silk, vicuna and suede prevailed to create a lighter informal feel to the house's iconic yet muted suit designs. In 2019, Mehdi Benabadji was appointed CEO of Brioni. The brand entered into a worldwide perfume licensing agreement with Lalique Group that runs through the end of 2024.

After a few seasons where a handful of looks were presented alongside the signature men’s shows, Brioni introduced the brand’s first womenswear collection in 2024. In 2025, the brand partnered with Mr Porter on a 25-piece capsule collection.

== Operations ==
In 2020, Brioni had 1,350 employees, including 1,000 tailors in production facilities in the towns of Penne, Montebello di Bertona and Civitella Casanova, among others. Since 1985, Brioni has operated the tailoring school Scuola di Alta Sartoria located near its factory in Penne. A made-to-measure suit requires 200 tailors and quality control specialists before shipment.

A Brioni jacket requires 12,000 stitches, only 17% of which are visible externally. Garments are pressed and steamed around 80 times to lengthen the fabric.

In 2020, Brioni operated 30 stores.

== Governance ==
CEOs

- 1990–2006: Umberto Angeloni
- 2006–2009: Antonella de Simone, Andrea Perrone, Antonio Bianchini
- 2009–2010: Andrea Perrone
- 2010–2014: Francesco Pesci
- 2014–2017: Gianluca Flore
- 2017–2019: Fabrizio Malverdi
- 2019–2025: Mehdi Benabadji
- May 2025-present: Federico Arrigoni

Creative designers

- 2013–2016: Brendan Mullane
- 2016: Justin O’Shea
- 2017–2018: Nina-Maria Nitsche
- 2018-December 2025: Norbert Stumpfl

== Advertisement ==
Brioni has hired movie stars for its advertising campaigns including: Samuel L. Jackson and Sir Anthony Hopkins in 2017, Harvey Keitel and Pierce Brosnan in 2018, Matt Dillon in 2019, Brad Pitt in 2020, Jude Law in 2022, and Glen Powell in 2023. For the campaigns, the brand has worked with photographers like Mikael Jansson.

== In popular culture ==
In the 2000 movie American Psycho, Patrick Bateman (played by Christian Bale) wears a Brioni tie.

In the 2008 Coen brothers' film Burn After Reading, Brad Pitt's character tries to convince a co-worker that she should consider dating a guy based on the belief that he is wearing a Brioni suit. In the pilot episode of The Good Wife, Alicia Florrick's boss comments that her colleague Cary Agos is wearing Brioni.

Brioni dressed Pierce Brosnan in all his James Bond movies from GoldenEye (1995) on, and Daniel Craig in Casino Royale (2006). It also supplied Donald Trump with suits for his TV show The Apprentice.

== See also ==
- Made in Italy
- Bespoke tailoring
- Made-to-measure
