= La Redoute =

French apparel and home decor company

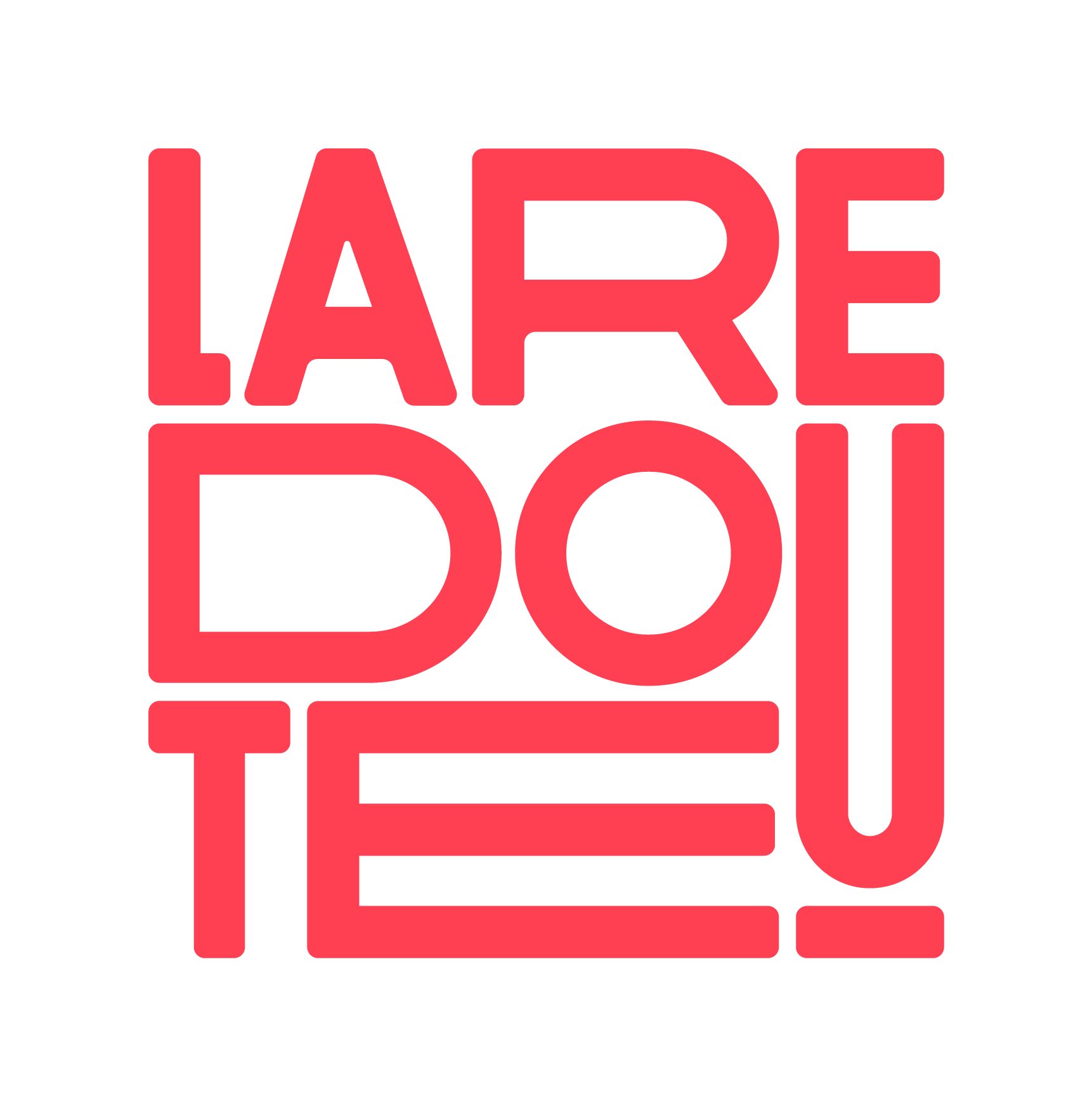
- Native name: La Redoute
- Company type: Private
- Founded: 1837, in France
- Headquarters: Roubaix, France
- Area served: Europe
- Key people: Philippe Houzé (chairman)
- Products: Apparel and home decor
- Website: laredoute.com

La Redoute is a French multichannel retailer founded by Joseph Pollet in 1837.

La Redoute specializes in ready-to-wear apparel and home decor. It is the 2nd largest seller of women's apparel and the 3rd largest seller of linens in France. Its e-commerce site, www.laredoute.com, is the top-ranked French site for apparel and home decor, with more than 7 million unique visitors each month. The company operates in 26 countries and has more than 10 million active customers.

A former subsidiary of Redcats Group (formerly La Redoute Group), itself part of Kering Group (formerly Pinault-Printemps-Redoute or PPR) since 1994, La Redoute was sold to its managers, Nathalie Balla and Eric Courteille, in June 2014.

== History ==
La Redoute was founded in 1837 when Joseph Pollet, son of a rural family, moved to the capital of the French wool region, Roubaix. There he opened the first worsted spinning operation, inventing a number of processes. His son, Charles, took up the torch and, in 1873, built a factory on a plot at Rue de Blanchemaille and Rue de La Redoute. He decided to name the business Filatures de La Redoute (Spinners of La Redoute) after the name of the street in Roubaix where it was located.

== See also ==
- 3 Suisses
