= Kering =

French multinational corporation

Kering S.A.

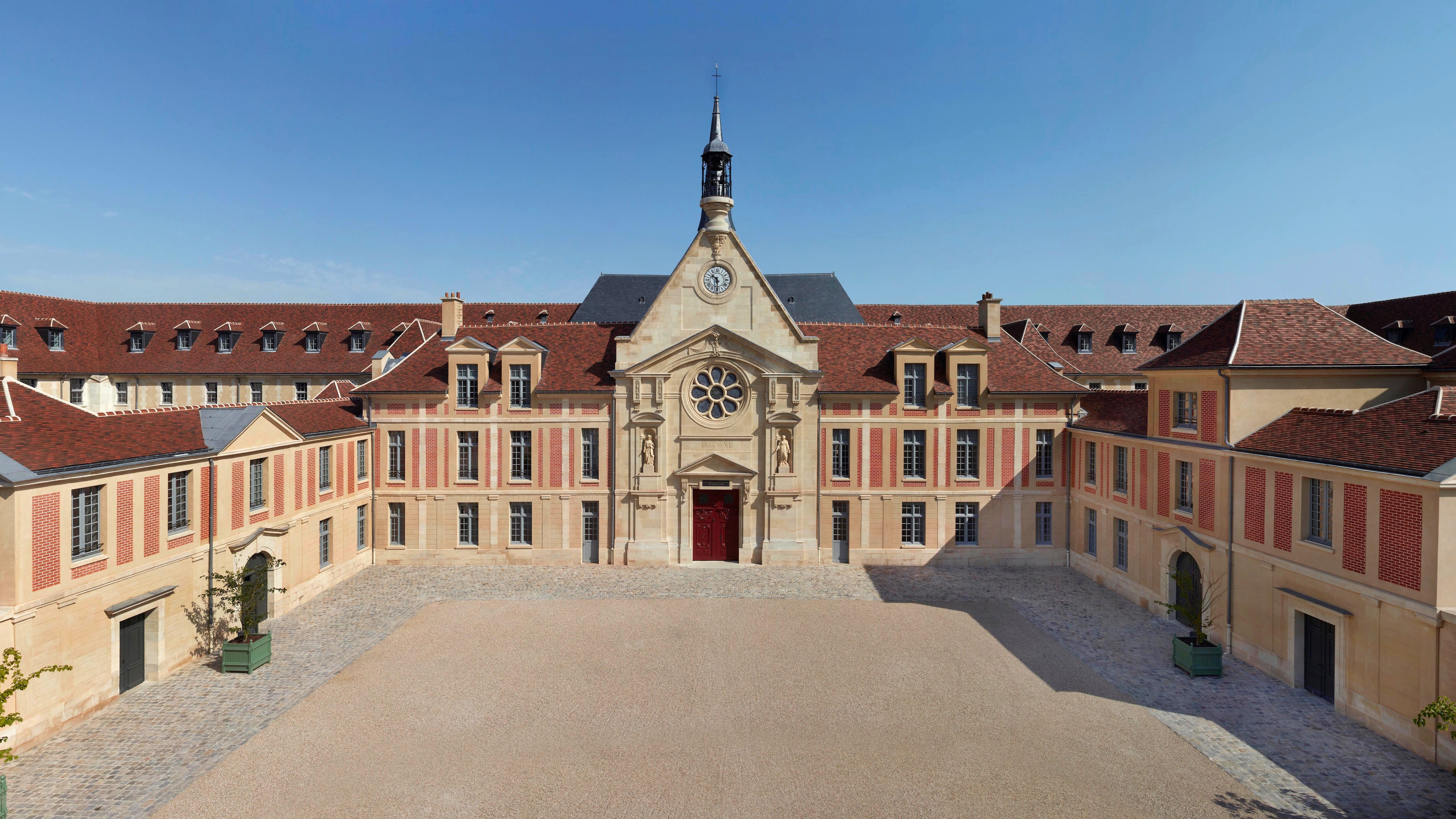
- Kering headquarters (former Hôpital Laennec in Paris)
- Formerly: Pinault S.A. Pinault-Printemps-Redoute; PPR
- Type: Public
- Traded as: Euronext Paris: KER; CAC 40 component
- ISIN: FR0000121485
- Industry: Conglomerate
- Founded: 1962; 64 years ago
- Founder: François Pinault
- Headquarters: 40 rue de Sèvres, Paris 7e, France
- Key people: François-Henri Pinault (Chairman); Luca de Meo (CEO)
- Products: Luxury goods
- Revenue: ▼€14.67 billion (2025)
- Operating income: ▼€1.047 billion (2025)
- Net income: ▼€0.14 billion (2025)
- Total assets: ▼€41.182 billion (2025)
- Total equity: ▼€15.515 billion (2025)
- Owners: Groupe Artémis (42.34% of shares, 59.34% of votes); Public float (56.86% of shares, 40.46% of votes)
- Number of employees: 43,731 (2025)
- Subsidiaries: Alexander McQueen; Balenciaga; Bottega Veneta; Boucheron; Brioni; Gucci; Pomellato; Qeelin; Yves Saint Laurent
- Website: www.kering.com
- Footnotes; Financials as of December 31, 2025. References

Kering S.A. (French: [keʁiŋ]) is a French multinational holding company specializing in luxury goods. Headquartered in Paris, it owns the brands Gucci, Yves Saint Laurent, Balenciaga, Bottega Veneta, Alexander McQueen, Creed, and Maui Jim, among others.

The timber-trading company Pinault S.A. was founded in 1962 by François Pinault. After the company was quoted on Euronext Paris in 1988, it became the retail conglomerate Pinault-Printemps-Redoute (PPR) in 1994. The luxury group was rebranded Kering in 2013. It has been a constituent of the CAC 40 since 1995. François-Henri Pinault has been President of Kering since 2005, and Luca de Meo CEO since September 2025.

== History ==
=== Timber (1962-1988) ===
In 1962, François Pinault opened the Établissements Pinault in Brittany (France) specialized in timber trading with a 100,000-franc loan from the bank. His business grew rapidly by acquiring many local timber operations and building its own import bridges, turning Pinault S.A. into a leading timber trader in France in the 1980s. By 1988, the group owned 180 companies and 33 factories for an annual revenue of 10 billion francs.

=== Retail (1988-2013) ===
In 1988, Pinault S.A. was listed on the Paris Stock Exchange and started a new period of growth in the retail sector through major acquisitions. In 1989, Pinault S.A. purchased 20% of CFAO, a French distribution conglomerate active throughout Africa. In 1990, Pinault S.A. and CFAO merged, and François Pinault became head of the newly formed group which acquired Conforama (French furniture retailer) in 1991, Printemps (French department stores) in 1992, which also owned 54% of La Redoute (French mail-order shopping retailer), and Fnac (French bookstore, multimedia and electronics retailer) in 1994. The group was renamed Pinault-Printemps-Redoute in 1994.

In 1999, Pinault-Printemps-Redoute purchased a controlling 42% stake of the Gucci group for $3 billion, and 100% of Yves Saint Laurent. Those investments marked the cornerstone of the group's shift towards luxury. Through Gucci, Pinault-Printemps-Redoute acquired Boucheron in 2000, Bottega Veneta and Balenciaga in 2001, and signed partnerships with Alexander McQueen and Stella McCartney.

In 2003, François-Henri Pinault, son of the founder François Pinault, became general manager of Artémis, the family holding company that controlled Pinault-Printemps-Redoute. In 2005, he was named president and CEO of Pinault-Printemps-Redoute, a year after the group had reached a 99.4% ownership of Gucci. The group continued acquiring luxury brands: Sowind Group (watch company owner of Girard-Perregaux) and Brioni (Italian tailor) in 2011; Pomellato Group (jewelry company owner of Pomellato and Dodo) and Qeelin (jewelry) in 2012; Christopher Kane (British fashion house) and Richard Ginori (porcelain) in 2013; Ulysse Nardin (watches) in 2014. The group also sold its retail assets: Le Printemps in 2006; Conforama in 2011; CFAO in 2012; Fnac in 2012; La Redoute in 2013. PPR developed a 'sport & lifestyle' portfolio with the acquisition of Puma in 2007, Cobra Golf in 2010, and Volcom in 2011, all of which were sold the following decade.

=== Luxury (since 2013) ===
In March 2013, PPR changed its name to Kering. Bottega Veneta hit the billion-dollar sales mark in 2012. In 2014, Kering created its own eyewear production arm, Kering Eyewear (1.5 billion euros revenue in 2023), and acquired the eyewear brands Lindberg in 2021 and Maui Jim in 2022. Balenciaga was turned into a disruptive fashion house and Yves Saint Laurent hit the 2-billion dollar sales mark in 2019. From 2015 to 2022, the group's revenue was essentially driven by Gucci's year-on-year high performance, the latter hitting the 10-billion dollars sales mark in 2022. The group divested its interests in Stella McCartney in 2018, Christopher Kane in 2019, and its watch division (Girard-Perregaux and Ulysse Nardin) in 2022. In 2023, Kering's annual results declined to 19.6 billion (-4%), mainly caused by the deceleration of Gucci's streak. That same year, Kering acquired the fragrance company Creed, 30% of the fashion house Valentino, and Kering Beauté was launched to manage in-house the development of beauty products for the group's brands.

In 2025, Luca de Meo was appointed CEO of Kering, succeeding François-Henri Pinault who remained President of the group. He immediately reorganized the group's top management, and appointed Francesca Bellettini CEO of Gucci. In October 2025, Kering sealed a partnership with L'Oréal regarding the sale of its beauty division, including Creed fragrances, a $4-billion deal. In December 2025, Kering announced the progressive acquisition of the Raselli Franco Group, manufacturer of jewelry pieces. In March 2026, Kering created Kering Jewelry to group its four jewelry houses (Boucheron, Pomelatto, Dodo, Qeelin). De Meo presented its relaunch plan (ReconKering) in April 2026 which included the reorganization of its management poles, the revitalization of its brands, and mainly the reset and relaunch of Gucci. Kering took a minority stake in Chinese fashion house Icicle and launched a partnership with Google for smartglasses. In July 2026, Kering terminated its Gucci Beauty licensing agreement with Coty and signed a 50-year licensing agreement with L'Oréal.

== Brands ==
Kering's headquarters are located in the former Hôpital Laennec in the 7th arrondissement of Paris. The parent holding company of Kering is Groupe Artémis. In 2025, Kering made 14.67 billion euros in revenue, and managed 43,731 employees and 1,719 stores.

Kering fully or partially owns the following brands:

Brand	Acquisition Year	Country
Gucci	1999	Italy
Yves Saint Laurent	1999	France
Boucheron	2000	France
Bottega Veneta	2001	Italy
Balenciaga	2001	Spain
Alexander McQueen	2001	United Kingdom
Brioni	2011	Italy
Qeelin	2012	China
Pomellato	2012	Italy
Dodo	2012	Italy
Ginori 1735 (formerly Richard Ginori)	2013	Italy
Lindberg	2021	Denmark
Maui Jim	2022	United States
Valentino (30%)	2023	Italy
Icicle (minority stake)	2026	China; France

Kering also owns Kering Eyewear (luxury eyewear production arm).

== Governance ==
- Chairman: François-Henri Pinault (since 2005)
- CEO: Luca de Meo (since 2025)

== Financial data ==
Results (in € millions)
Year	2006	2007	2008	2009	2010	2011	2012	2013	2014	2015	2016	2017	2018	2019	2020	2023	2024	2025
Sales	17 931	17 761	20 201	16 525	11 008	12 227	9 736	9 748	10 037	11 584	12 385	15 478	13 665.2	15 883.3	13 100.2	19 566	17 194	14 675
Net results	680	1 058	924	985	965	986	1 048	50	528.9	696	814	1 786	3 714.9	3 211.5	1 972.2	2 983	1 133	72

== Other activities ==
=== Kering Foundation ===
Established in 2008, the foundation has centered their worldwide attention on combating violence experienced by (around 1 in 3) women, and (around 1 in 5) children, through awareness-raising campaigns in partnership with national bodies such as "Donne in Rete Contro la Violenza" (D.i.Re) in Italy and National Network to End Domestic Violence (NNEDV) in the United States, expanding that protection from offline to online, focusing on Gen Z, who spend up to 10 hours on the internet and are vulnerable for cyberbullying.

The foundation started as "PPR Corporate Foundation for Women’s Dignity and Rights" in 2008. In around five years, 140,000 women had benefited, with 47 partnerships initiated. In 2013, the now "Fondation Kering", following the group's name change, had also started to cover regions where the group operated. Around a decade into operations, the foundation started including child protection as a way to cut intergenerational violence ties. Around the same time, Kering changed the legal status of its corporate foundation to an endowment fund, renaming it the "Kering Foundation" as a form to facilitate collaborations within the Group’s Houses, other companies and foundations.

Their centers of operations are in France, Italy, Korea, Mexico, the United Kingdom and the United States.

=== Women in Motion ===
Since 2015, Kering has been hosting the project Women in Motion in partnership with the Cannes Festival to highlight and reward women's contribution to cinema. This project was extended to the Rencontres d'Arles photography festival in 2019, two panels at the Palm Springs International Film Festival in 2025, an initial talk event at the Tokyo International Film Festival in 2019 that has continued since 2022, an event at the Red Sea International Film Festival in 2025, and a talk event and screening at the Shanghai International Film Festival in 2025. Though the project focuses on highlighting activities by women in film, both in fromt and behind the cameras, in the talk events men also participate.

== See also ==
- François Pinault
- François-Henri Pinault
- Groupe Artémis
