= Bright Eyes Sunglasses =

- Type: Private
- Industry: Retail
- Founded: 1985
- Founders: Robert Johnstone; Antonina (Ann) Johnstone
- Headquarters: Cairns, Queensland, Australia
- Products: Eyewear and sunglasses
- Owners: Ralph Edwards; Geoff Harbert
- Website: www.brighteyes.com.au

Bright Eyes Sunglasses is a company that was established in Cairns, Queensland, Australia, by Robert and Antonina (Ann) Johnstone, in 1985. By 1995, the chain included 115 stores. In 1997, the franchise was sold to Ian Thomas, a Cairns property developer. Ian Thomas reduced the stores from 112 to 85, removing the unprofitable stores strengthening the brand and growing the gross profit of the group by 50%.

In 2000, Bright Eyes was sold to a consortium of three businessmen: Geoff Harbert, Graham Bradshaw, and Ralph Edwards. By 2003, there were 10 franchise stores and 19 company-owned stores. The full chain's 2003 turnover reached A$6.7 million. Harbert stated in 2004 that some stores were expanding their product lines, in order to remain profitable.

The company having grown to 155 stores, 1/3 of which company run, eventually came under the control of Oakley, Inc., which was itself purchased by Luxottica in 2007, transferring ownership of the chain to Luxottica. The takeover resulted in Luxottica becoming "by far the biggest eyewear chain in Australia."

By 2008, Luxottica reduced the business to 47 stores and sold the business back to business partners Ralph Edwards and Geoff Harbert.
