= Bonnie Brennan =

American auction-house executive

- Born: 1973 (age 52–53); Michigan, US
- Occupation: Auction house executive
- Title: CEO of Christie's

Bonnie Brennan (born c. 1973) is an American auction-house executive. She has been the CEO of Christie's since February 1, 2025. Prior to that, she had a 13-year career at Christie's, including four years as head of Christie's Americas. Before joining Christie's she had a 15-year career at Sotheby's.

== Early life and education ==
Brennan is a native of Michigan, and grew up in a suburb outside of Detroit. She attended the Academy of the Sacred Heart in Bloomfield Township, Michigan.

She graduated from Northwestern University, where she majored in both art history and communications, receiving a BA in 1995.

== Career ==
Brennan's very early career was in the advertising business.

She began her auction-house career at Sotheby's, in 1997. She worked in various business development roles focused on trusts and estates in New York, eventually reaching the position of senior vice president.

Brennan moved to Christie's in 2012. She rose through positions including head of trusts, estates, and wealth management for Christie's Americas. By 2020 she was chairman of business development of Christie's Americas; in this position she helped secure and manage major estate sales such as the 2018 Barney A. Ebsworth auction, as well as the collections of Jayne Wrightsman and the non-profit Cleveland Clinic.

In 2021 she was appointed president of Christie’s Americas, and during her tenure the region grew to account for 48 percent of Christie's sales. She played a key role in securing Microsoft co-founder Paul Allen's $1.6 billion art collection for Christie's auction, and oversaw the auctions of the collections of Ann and Gordon Getty and Anne H. Bass. She also championed increasing Christie's digital strategy and diversifying the auction house's offerings to engage younger and more diverse buyers.

On February 1, 2025, Brennan was appointed chief executive of Christie's, succeeding Guillaume Cerutti. She stated that she plans to preserve Christie's heritage while focusing on innovation and engaging new audiences, geographies and technology, including AI.

== Personal life ==
Brennan is based in New York City, and divides her time between New York and London.
