= Christie's =

British auction house

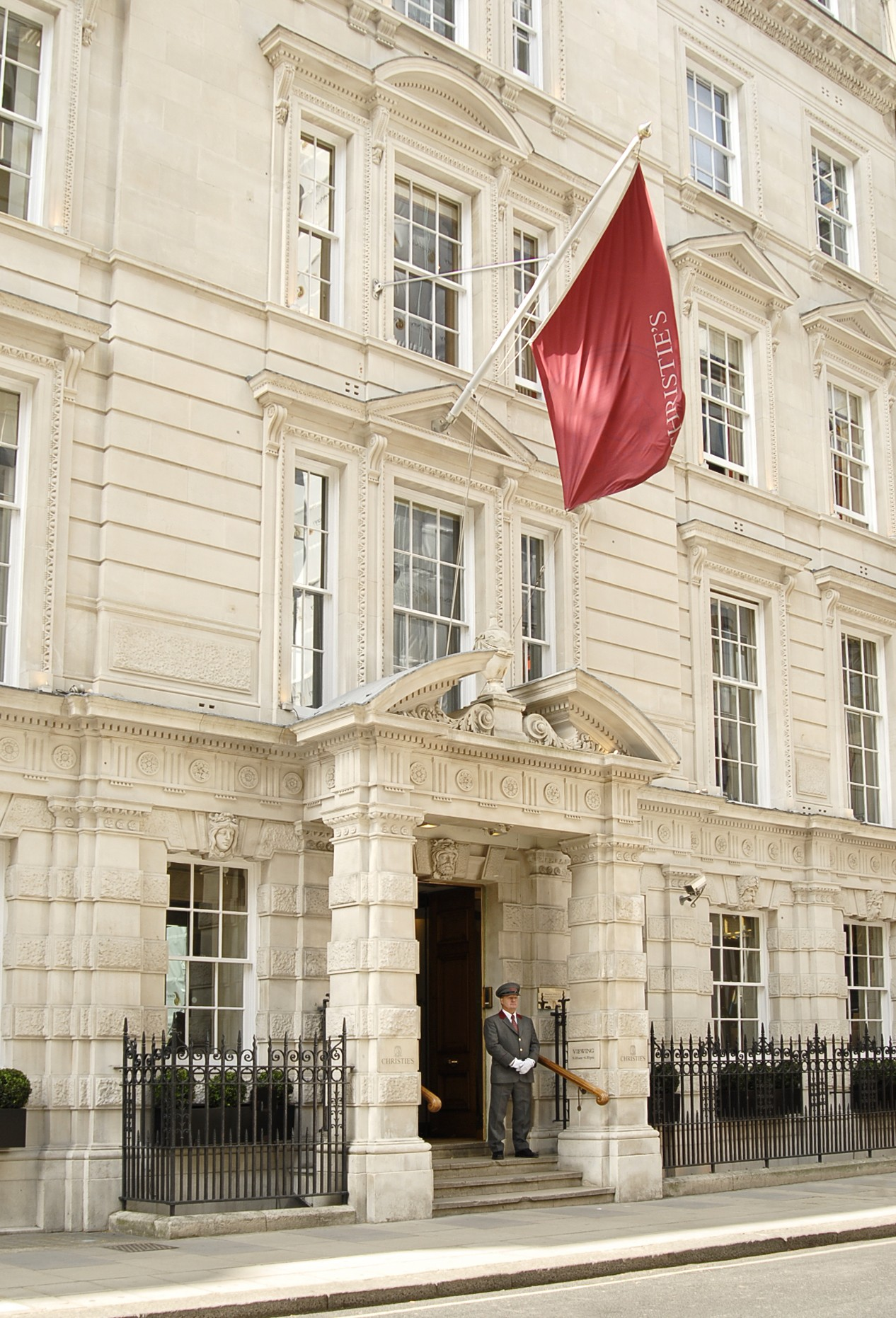
- Christie's in King Street, St James's
- Type: Subsidiary
- Industry: Art, auctions
- Founded: 1766; 260 years ago
- Founder: James Christie
- Headquarters: London, England
- Area served: Worldwide
- Key people: Guillaume Cerutti (chairman); Bonnie Brennan (CEO)
- Revenue: ▲US$6.2 billion (2025)
- Owner: François Pinault
- Parent: Groupe Artémis
- Website: christies.com

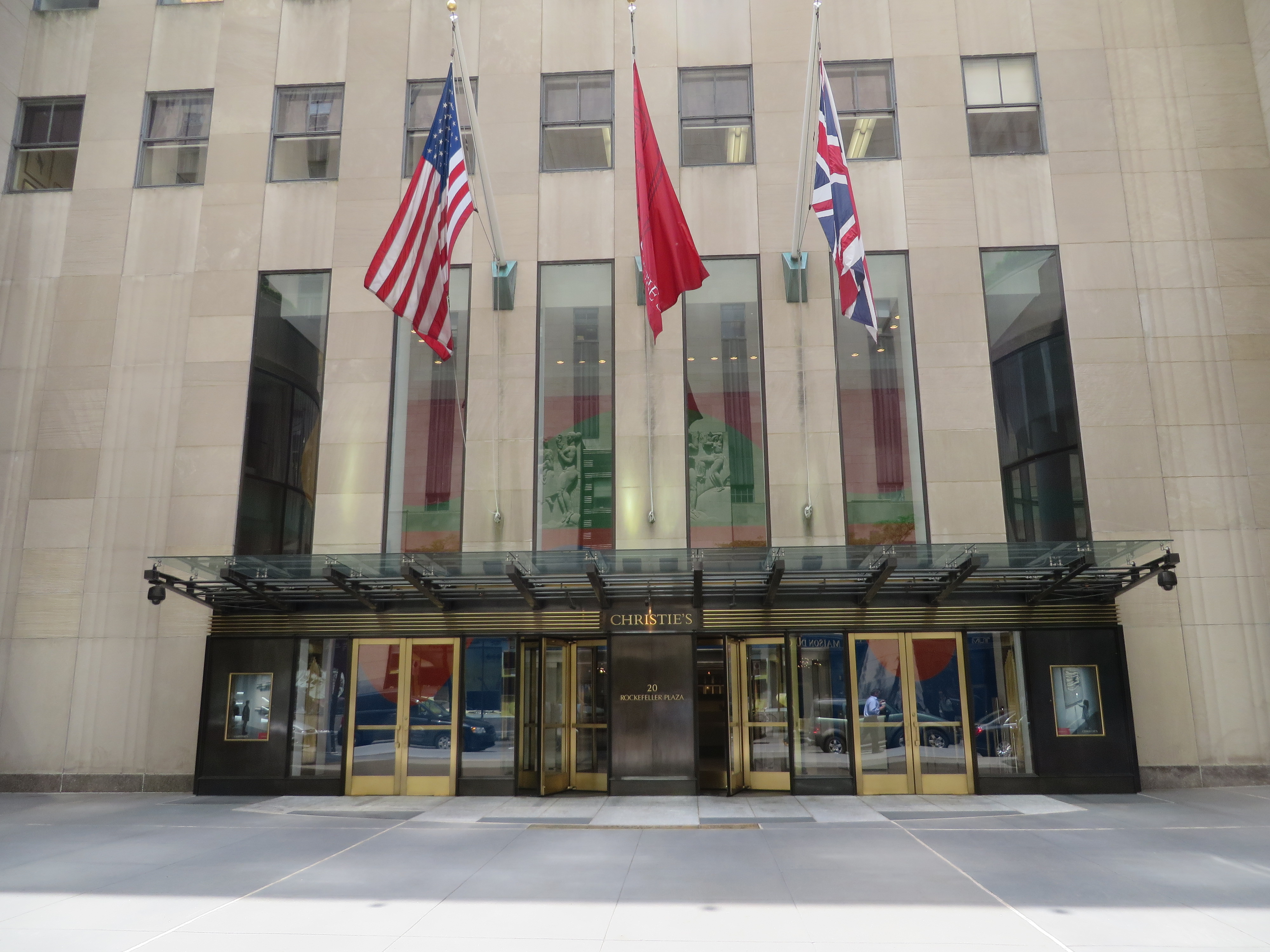
Christie's American branch at Rockefeller Center in New York

Christie's is a British auction house founded in 1766 by James Christie. Its main premises are on King Street, St James's in London, with additional salerooms in New York, Paris, Hong Kong, Milan, Geneva, Shanghai and Dubai. It is owned by Groupe Artémis, the holding company of François Pinault. In 2022, Christie's sold US$8.4 billion in art and luxury goods, an all-time high for any auction house. On 15 November 2017, the Salvator Mundi was sold at Christie's in New York for $450 million to Saudi Prince Badr bin Abdullah Al Saud, the highest price ever paid for a painting.

== History ==
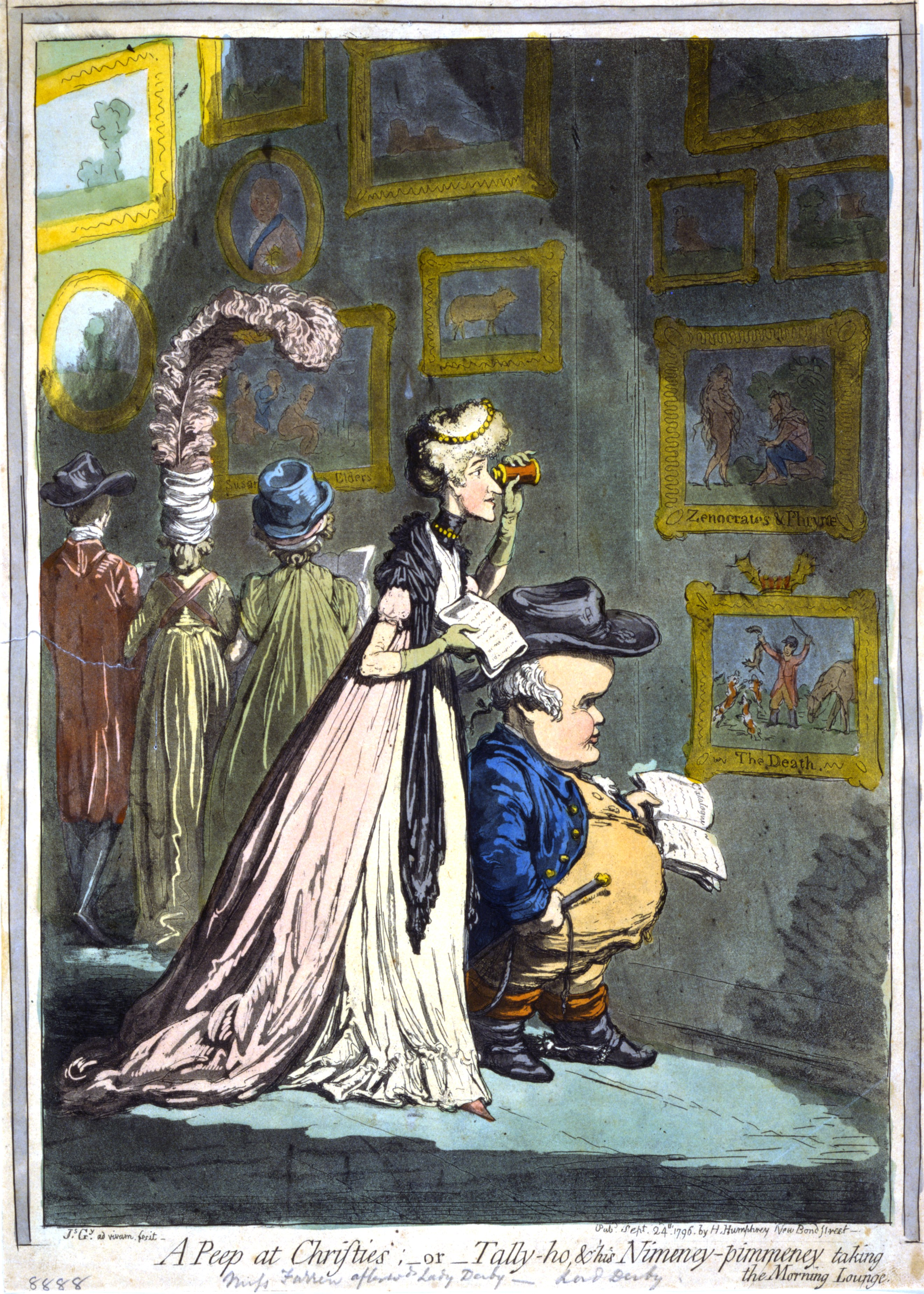
In A Peep at Christies (1799), James Gillray caricatured actress Elizabeth Farren and huntsman Lord Derby examining paintings appropriate to their tastes and heights.

=== Founding ===
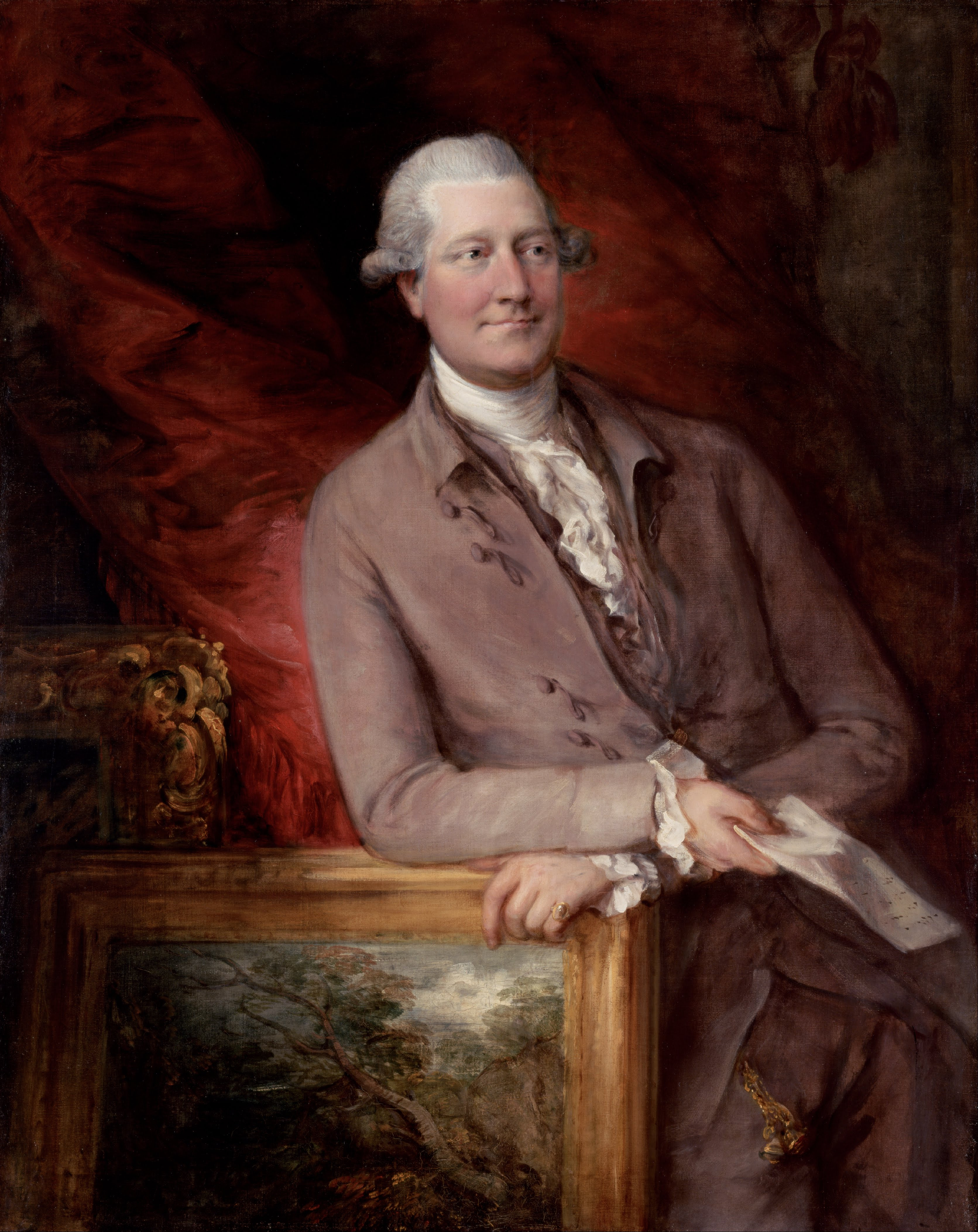
Portrait of James Christie by Thomas Gainsborough, 1778

The official company literature states that founder James Christie (1730–1803) conducted the first sale in London on 5 December 1766, and the earliest auction catalogue the company retains is from December 1766. However, other sources note that James Christie rented auction rooms from 1762, and newspaper advertisements for Christie's sales dating from 1759 have also been traced. After his death, Christie's son, James Christie the Younger (1773–1831) took over the business.

=== 20th century ===
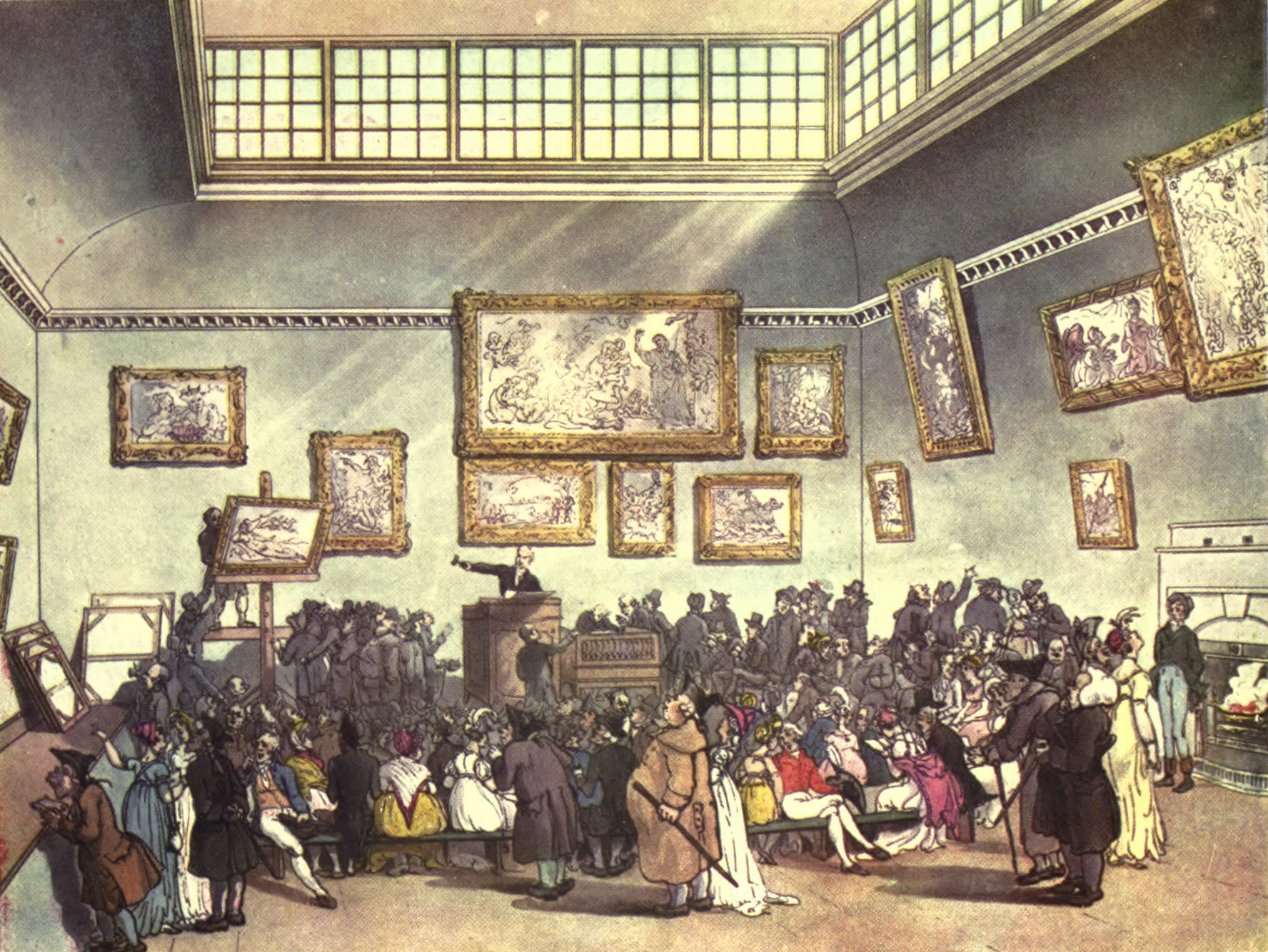
The Microcosm of London (1808), an engraving of Christie's auction room

Christie's was a public company, listed on the London Stock Exchange, from 1973 to 1999. In 1974, Jo Floyd was appointed chairman of Christie's. He served as chairman of Christie's International plc from 1976 to 1988, until handing over to Lord Carrington, and later was a non-executive director until 1992. Christie's International Inc. held its first sale in the United States in 1977. Christie's growth was slow but steady since 1989, when it had 42% of the auction market.

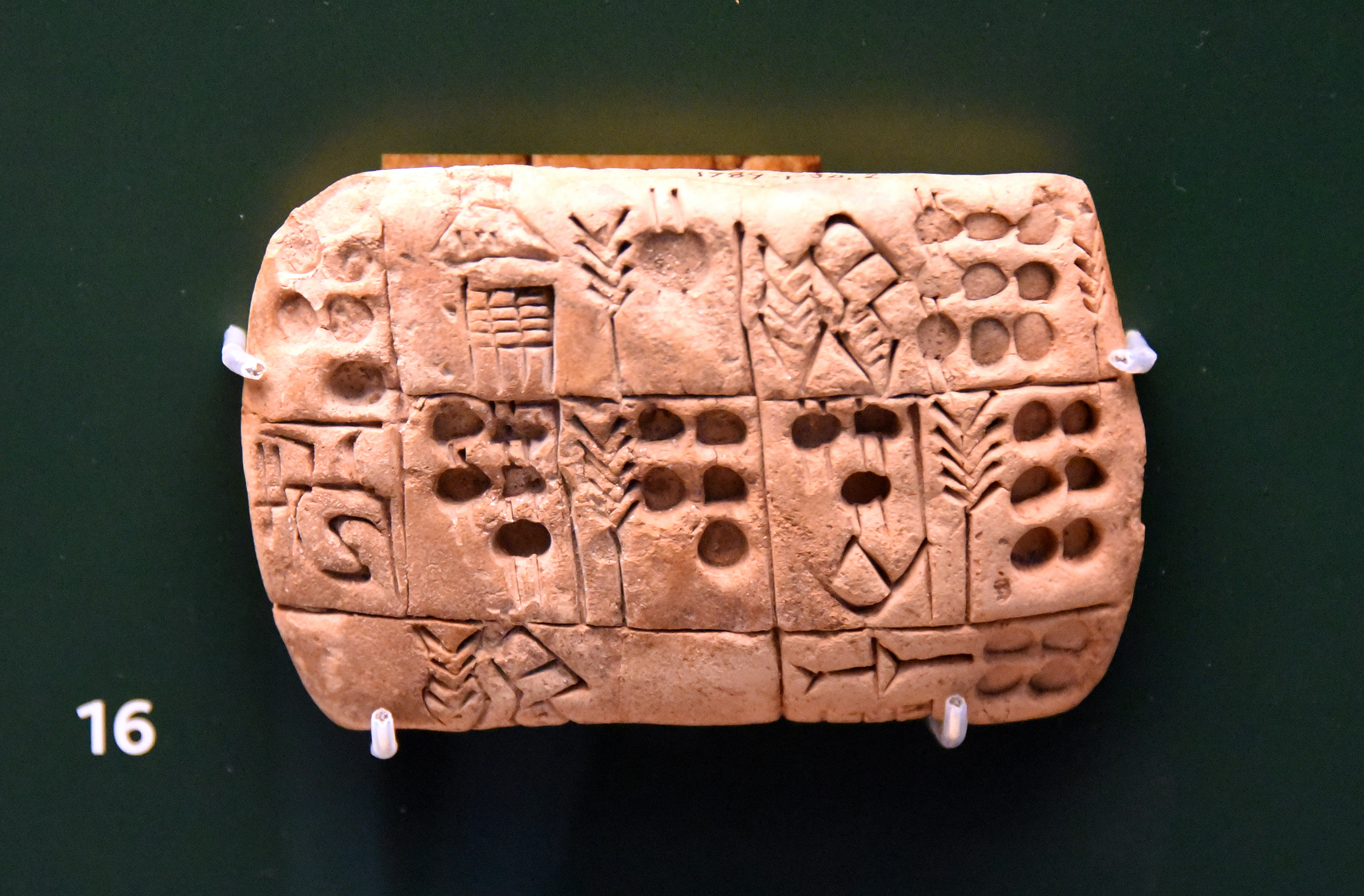
Clay tablet, a record of barley and emmer. Late Uruk period, 3300–3100 BCE. Purchased via Christie's in 1989, no provenance. British Museum

In 1990, the company reversed a long-standing policy and guaranteed a minimum price for a collection of artworks in its May auctions. In 1996, sales exceeded those of Sotheby's for the first time since 1954. However, profits did not grow at the same pace; from 1993 through 1997, Christie's annual pretax profits were about $60M, whereas Sotheby's annual pretax profits were about $265M for those years.

In 1993, Christie's paid $10.9M for the London gallery Spink & Son, which specialised in Oriental art and British paintings; the gallery was run as a separate entity. The company bought Leger Gallery for $3.3M in 1996, and merged it with Spink to become Spink-Leger. Spink-Leger closed in 2002. To make itself competitive with Sotheby's in the property market, Christie's bought Great Estates in 1995, then the largest network of independent estate agents in North America, changing its name to Christie's Great Estates Inc.

In December 1997, under the chairmanship of Lord Hindlip, Christie's put itself on the auction block, but after two months of negotiations with the consortium-led investment firm SBC Warburg Dillon Read it did not attract a bid high enough to accept. In May 1998, François Pinault's holding company, Groupe Artémis S.A., first bought 29.1 per cent of the company for $243.2M, and subsequently purchased the rest of it in a deal that valued the entire company at $1.2bn. The company has since not been reporting profits, though it gives sale totals twice a year. Its policy, in line with UK accounting standards, is to convert non-UK results using an average exchange rate weighted daily by sales throughout the year.

=== 21st century ===
In 2002, Christie's France held its first auction in Paris.

Like Sotheby's, Christie's became increasingly involved in high-profile private transactions. In 2006, Christie's offered a reported $21M guarantee to the Donald Judd Foundation and displayed the artist's works for five weeks in an exhibition that later won an AICA award for "Best Installation in an Alternative Space". In 2007 it brokered a $68M deal that transferred Thomas Eakins' The Gross Clinic (1875) from the Jefferson Medical College at the Thomas Jefferson University in Philadelphia to joint ownership by the Philadelphia Museum of Art and the Pennsylvania Academy of the Fine Arts. In the same year, the Haunch of Venison gallery became a subsidiary of the company.

On 28 December 2008, The Sunday Times reported that Pinault's debts left him "considering" the sale of Christie's and that a number of "private equity groups" were thought to be interested in its acquisition. In January 2009, the company employed 2,100 people worldwide, though an unspecified number of staff and consultants were soon to be cut due to a worldwide downturn in the art market; later news reports said that 300 jobs would be cut. With sales for premier Impressionist, Modern, and contemporary artworks tallying only US$248.8M in comparison to US$739M just a year before, a second round of job cuts began after May 2009.

In 2012, Impressionist works, which dominated the market during the 1980s boom, were replaced by contemporary art as Christie's top category. Asian art was the third most lucrative area. With income from classic auctioneering falling, treaty sales made £413.4 million ($665M) in the first half of 2012, an increase of 53% on the same period last year; they now represent more than 18% of turnover. The company has since promoted curated events, centered on a theme rather than an art classification or time period.

As part of a companywide review in 2017, Christie's announced the layoffs of 250 employees, or 12 per cent of the total work force, based mainly in Britain and Europe.

In June 2021, Christie's Paris held its first sale dedicated to women artists, most notably Louise Moillon's Nature morte aux raisins et pêches. Towards the end of the year, Christie's entered into a partnership with OpenSea to conduct auctions of non-fungible tokens (NFT) on the blockchain. The collaboration's first sale featured works by artists including Andre O'Shea, Recur, Oseanworld, GMUNK, and Ash Thorp.

In 2022 Christie's sold $8.4bn in art and luxury goods, an all-time high for any auction house.

Christie's agreed to acquire American classic car auction house, Gooding & Company, in September 2024.

== Commissions ==
From 2008 until 2013, Christie's charged 25 per cent for the first $50,000; 20 per cent on the amount between $50,001 and $1M, and 12 per cent on the rest. From 2013, it charged 25 per cent for the first $75,000; 20 per cent on the next $75,001 to $1.5M and 12 per cent on the rest.

As of 2023, Christie's commission (buyer's premium) is 26 per cent of the hammer price of each lot up to £800,000/US$1,000,000, plus 21 per cent of the hammer price from £800,001/US$1,000,001 up to and including £4,500,000/US$6,000,000, and 15 per cent on the rest.

== Locations ==
As of 2023, Christie's has offices in 46 countries worldwide, with salerooms in London, New York, Paris, Geneva, Milan, Amsterdam, Dubai, Hong Kong, and Shanghai.

=== Europe ===
Christie's flagship saleroom is in London on King Street in St. James's, where it has been based since 1823. It had a second London saleroom in South Kensington which opened in 1975 and primarily handled the middle market. Christie's permanently closed the South Kensington saleroom in July 2017 as part of their restructuring plans announced in March 2017. The closure was due in part to a considerable decrease in sales between 2015 and 2016 in addition to the company expanding its online sales presence.

In early 2017, Christie's also announced plans to scale back its operation in Amsterdam.

=== Americas ===
In 1977, led by then Chairman Stephen Lash, the company opened its first international branch on Park Avenue in New York City in the Delmonico's Hotel grand ballroom on the second floor; in 1997 it took a 30-year lease on a 28,000 m^{2} (300,000 sq ft) space in Rockefeller Center for $40M. In September 2026, Christie's announced a renovation of its Rockefeller Center headquarters, engaging lead design architect Practice for Architecture and Urbanism (PAU) and executive architect INC Architecture & Design.

Until 2001, Christie's East, a division that sold lower-priced art and objects, was located at 219 East 67th Street. In 1996, Christie's bought a townhouse on East 59th Street in Manhattan as a separate gallery where experts could show clients art in complete privacy to conduct private treaty sales.

Christie's first opened an office in Los Angeles in 1978 and in San Francisco in 1982. Early southern California sales included the 1979 sale of the estate collection of M.L. “Bud” Cohn, a Los Angeles Mercedes-Benz collector, subsequent car auctions at the Los Angeles Convention Center in the 1980s, the company's first west coast wine auction at the former Bel Age Hotel in 1989, and, in 1988, the sale of the Estelle Doheny Collection at St. John’s Seminary in Camarillo, Ventura County for the Archdiocese of Los Angeles, which featured 19th-century French paintings (including Théodore Rousseau, Corot, Ziem, Lhermitte) and a large group of Currier & Ives prints. In 1997, it opened a West Coast headquarters and saleroom in Beverly Hills, where its first sales were held that June. In April 2017, it moved to a 4,500 sq ft (420 m^{2}) two-story flagship space in Beverly Hills, designed by Kulapat Yantrasast's wHY. In 2021, it opened new San Francisco offices designed by T.W. Ryan Architecture in the historic Gallery Building on Geary Street. Major sales conducted in Los Angeles include the sale of the wine collection of Henry Earl Singleton, realizing $3.7 million; a sale devoted to the work of Piero Fornasetti; the sale of the collection of Billy Wilder; the sale of the estate of Tony and Elizabeth Duquette; and the sale of the wine collection of musician and producer Quincy Jones.

=== Asia ===
Christie's has been operating a space in Hong Kong's Alexandra House since 2014. In 2021, the company announced plans to move its Hong Kong headquarters to the Zaha Hadid-designed luxury tower The Henderson in 2024, where it will launch year-round auctions. Measuring more than 50,000 sq ft (4,600 m^{2}) over four storeys, the new space, which incorporates a permanent saleroom and galleries, is comparable in size to Christie's London headquarters.

== Notable auctions ==
=== Paintings ===
- In 1848 the sale of the contents of Stowe House after the bankruptcy of the Duke of Buckingham and Chandos was one of the first and most publicised British country house contents auctions. The sale raised £75,400 and included the Chandos portrait of William Shakespeare.
- The 1882 sale of the Hamilton Palace collection raised £332,000.
- In March 1987, Vincent van Gogh's Vase with Fifteen Sunflowers fetched an auction record of $39.9M at Christie's, making it the most expensive painting in the world at the time, at more than three times the price of the previous worldwide record for the highest paid for any painting.
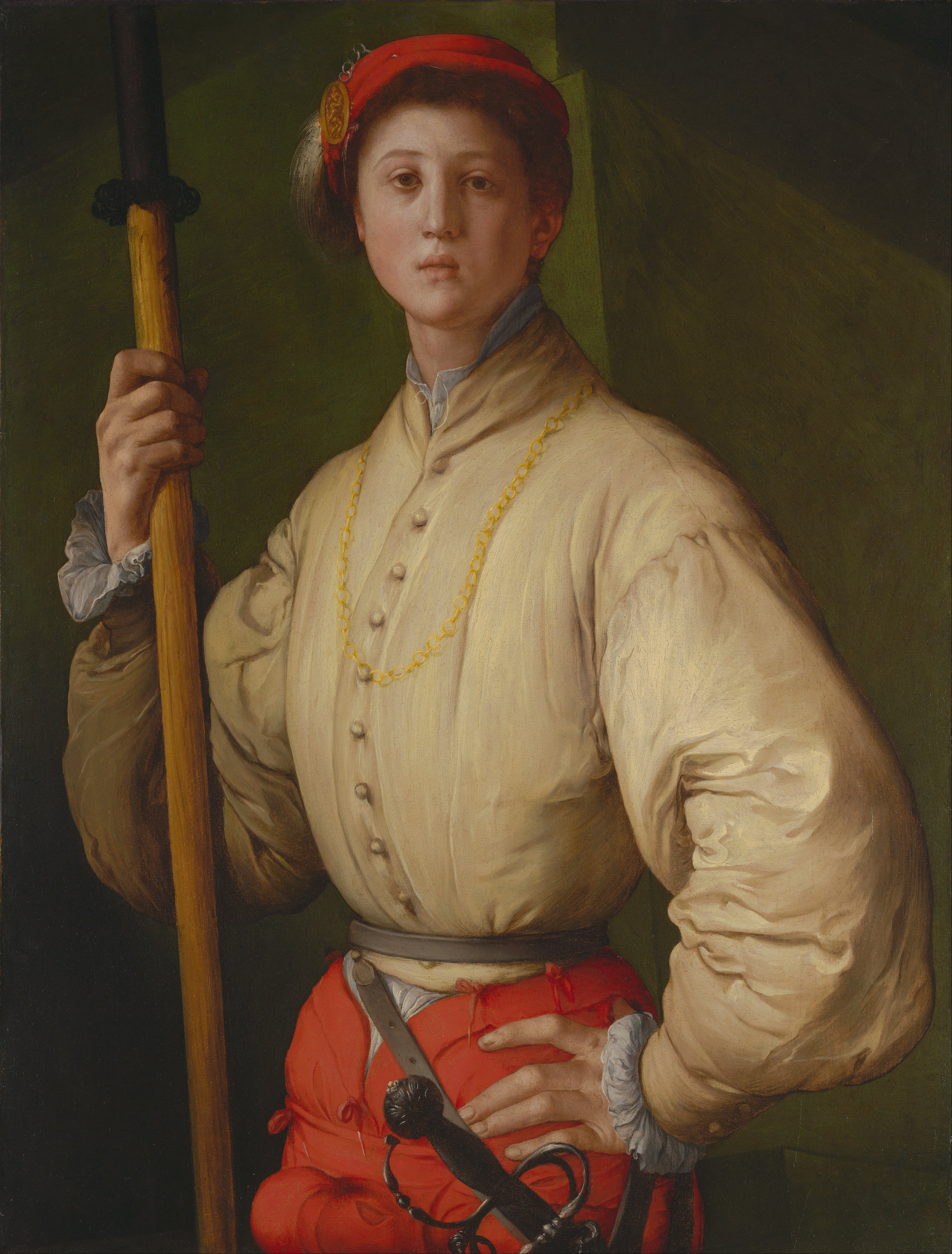
  Pontormo, Portrait of a Halberdier, 1528–1530. Sold by Christie's for US$35.2 million in 1989. (J. Paul Getty Museum, Los Angeles)
- In May 1989, Pontormo's Portrait of a Halberdier was sold to the J. Paul Getty Museum for $35.2M, more than tripling the previous auction record for an Old Master painting.
- In November 2006, four celebrated paintings by Gustav Klimt were sold for a total of $192M, after being restituted by Austria to Jewish heirs after a lengthy legal battle.
- In November 2007, an album of eight leaves, ink on paper, by China's Ming dynasty court painter Dong Qichang was sold at the Christie's Hong Kong Chinese Paintings Auction for US$6,235,500, a world auction record for the artist.
- In 2008, the ink wash painting of the RX-78-2 Gundam painted by Tenmyouya Hisashi in 2005 was sold in the Christie's auction held in Hong Kong at a price of US$600,000.
- In June 2008, Le Bassin aux Nymphéas by Claude Monet was sold for a price of $80.4M, the highest price ever for a Monet.
- Christie's Hong Kong, November 2009 sale of Fine Modern Chinese Paintings, sold a work by Fu Baoshi titled Landscape inspired by Dufu's Poetic Sentiments, for HK$60M (US$7.7M) – a world record for the artist.
- Christie's auctioned Pablo Picasso's Nude, Green Leaves and Bust on 4 May 2010. The piece sold for US$106.5M, making the sale among the most expensive paintings ever sold.
- On 12 November 2013, Francis Bacon's Three Studies of Lucian Freud sold for US$142.4M (including the buyer's premium) to an unnamed buyer, nominally becoming the most expensive work of art ever to be sold at auction.
- On 11 May 2015, Pablo Picasso's Les Femmes d'Alger ("Version O") sold for US$179.3M to an unnamed buyer, becoming the most expensive work of art ever to be sold at auction at Christie's New York. In November of the same year, Amedeo Modigliani's Nu Couché (1917–18) sold at Christie's in New York for $170.4M, making it the second most expensive work sold at auction.
- On 7 July 2016, the highest price ever sold for an old master painting at Christie's was achieved with £44,882,500 for Rubens' Lot and his Daughters.
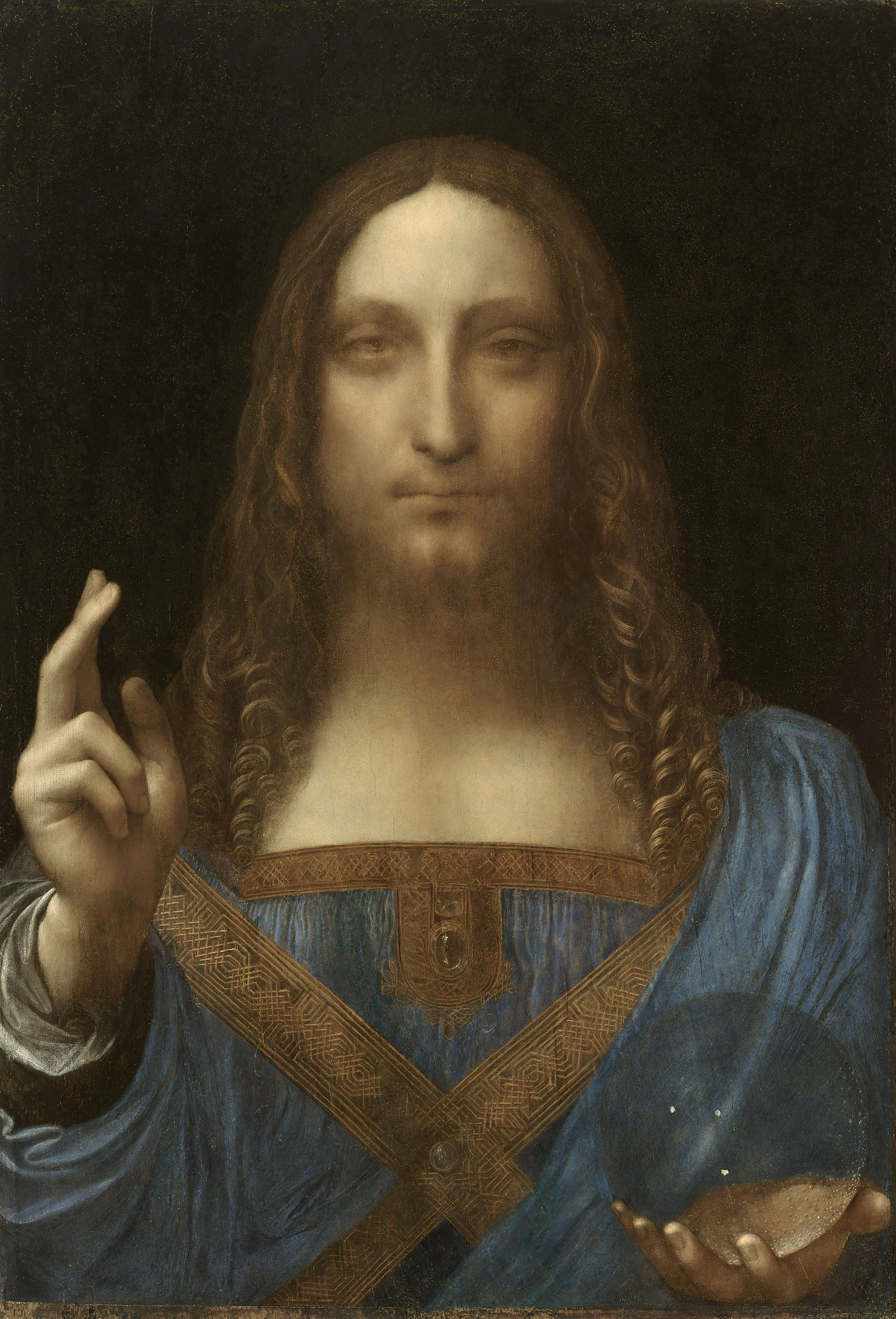
  The Salvator Mundi is the most expensive painting ever sold at auction.
- On 15 November 2017, Leonardo da Vinci's Salvator Mundi sold for a record $450.3M (including buyer's premium).
- In May 2022, Andy Warhol's silkscreen painting Shot Sage Blue Marilyn sold at Christie's New York for $195M, making it the most expensive work of American art sold at auction and the most expensive work of 20th-century art sold at auction.
- In November 2022, the art collection of Microsoft co-founder Paul Allen was auctioned at Christie's New York. It was the biggest sale in art auction history, surpassing $1.5bn in sales. Six works sold for more than $100M: Seurat's Les Poseuses Ensemble (Petite version), ($149M, with fees); Paul Cézanne's 1888–90 La Montagne Sainte-Victoire ($138M); van Gogh's Verger avec cyprès ($117M); and Gustav Klimt's 1903 Birch Forest ($105M). The auction also included paintings by Botticelli, David Hockney, Roy Lichtenstein, Edward Hopper, Andy Warhol, Jasper Johns and Jan Brueghel the Younger. Proceeds from the auction benefitted undisclosed philanthropies.
- In November 2024 a painting by surrealist artist Rene Magritte broke an auction record, selling for more than $121 million at Christie's in New York. The previous record for a work by Magritte was $79 million, set in 2022.
- In May 2025, a painting by Marlene Dumas Miss January (1997) broke the record for a living woman artist, selling for $13.6 million with fees at Christie's 21st Century Evening sale in New York.

=== Jewellery ===
- In November 1999, a single strand necklace of 41 natural and graduated pearls, which belonged to Barbara Hutton, was auctioned by Christie's Geneva for $1,476,000.
- In May 2016, the Oppenheimer Blue diamond sold for CHF56,837,000 ($57.6M), a record price for a jewel at auction.
- In May 2023, the jewellery collection once owned by Austrian billionaire Heidi Horten, who died in 2022, set a record for the most valuable single collection of jewels in an auction, fetching CHF180M ($201M). In August 2023, Christie's cancelled a second Horten jewellery sale, which had been scheduled for November, after Jewish charities and organizations refused to accept portions of the proceeds from the first sale citing the source of Horten's wealth.

=== Sculptures ===
- In 2009, controversy arose after the auction of two imperial bronze zodiac sculptures (for US$36M) collected by Yves Saint Laurent, as the items had been looted in 1860 from the Old Summer Palace of Beijing by French and British forces at the close of the Second Opium War.
- On 14 June 2010 Amedeo Modigliani's Tête, a limestone sculpture of a woman's head, sold for $52.6M, making it one of the most expensive sculpture ever sold, and at the time the most expensive work of art sold in France.
- On 15 May 2019, Jeff Koons' three-foot-tall stainless steel sculpture Rabbit, created in 1986 and reminiscent of a silver balloon animal, sold for $91.1 million, a new world record at auction for a work by a living artist.
- On 4 July 2019, a bust fragment of Tutankhamun was sold for £4.7M. The Egyptian Ministry of Antiquities had tried to stop the auction, citing concerns that the bust had been looted from a temple and illegally taken from Egypt in the 1970s.

=== Documents ===
- On 11 November 1994, the Codex Leicester was sold to Bill Gates for US$30,802,500.
- In 1998, Christie's in New York sold the famous Archimedes Palimpsest after the conclusion of a lawsuit in which its ownership was disputed.
- On 22 June 2012, George Washington's personal annotated copy of the Acts Passed at a Congress of the United States of America from 1789, which includes The Constitution of the United States and a draft of the Bill of Rights, was sold at Christie's for a record $9,826,500, with fees the final cost, to The Mount Vernon Ladies' Association. This was the record for a document sold at auction.
- On 25 June 2020, Christie's sold a Timurid Quran manuscript, described as "rare and breathtaking", for £7M (with fees), ten times its estimate. The price was the highest price ever paid for a Quran manuscript. Probably created at a Timurid prince's court, the manuscript comprised 534 folios of Arabic calligraphy on "gold-flecked, coloured paper from Ming China". The sale was criticized as the manuscript apparently lacked any provenance prior to the 1980s, and the details of its removal from its country of origin were unclear.

=== Fossils ===
- In October 2020, Christie's sold Stan, one of the world's most complete Tyrannosaurus rex skeletons for US$31.8M, setting a new world record for any dinosaur skeleton or fossil ever sold at auction at the time. In 2022, it was discovered that the skeleton was acquired by the Natural History Museum Abu Dhabi.
- In May 2022, Christie's sold a Deinonychus skeleton nicknamed "Hector" for US$12.4M.
- In September 2022, Christie's announced an upcoming auction of a Tyrannosaurus rex skeleton named "Shen". 54% of the skeleton was claimed by Christie's to be original bone. Subsequently in November, Christie's pulled the skeleton from auction after accusations by Peter Larson that the skeleton was predominantly a replica of Stan, alleging that very little original material was present.
- In December 2024, Christie's sold 2 Allosaurus skeletons and a Stegosaurus skeleton at a combined value of US$15.7M. The two Allosaurus, consisting of an adult and a juvenile, sold for $10.2M, while the Stegosaurus sold for $5.3M. The fossils were subsequently seized from the Singapore-based buyer by Britain's National Crime Agency under the Proceeds of Crime Act, as part of the investigation into the 2023 Singapore money laundering case.
- In November 2025, Christie's announced the upcoming auction of a caenagnathid skeleton excavated from the Hell Creek Formation. Nicknamed "Spike", the skeleton is listed at an asking price of £3m to £5m.

=== Other ===
- In November 1987, during the Royal Albert Hall auction, Christie's auctioned a Bugatti Royale automobile for a world record price of £5.5M.
- In June 2001, Elton John sold 20 of his cars at Christie's, saying he did not drive them often because he was frequently out of the country. The sale, which included a 1993 Jaguar XJ220, the most expensive at £234,750, and several Ferraris, Rolls-Royces, and Bentleys, raised nearly £2M.
- In 2006, a single Imperial Qing dynasty porcelain bowl, another item which belonged to Barbara Hutton, was auctioned by Christie's Hong Kong for a price of US$19.5M.
- On 16 May 2006, Christie's auctioned a Stradivarius called The Hammer for a record US$3,544,000. It was, at that time, the most paid at public auction for any musical instrument.
- In December 2006, one of the three versions of the Givenchy black dress worn by Audrey Hepburn in the film Breakfast at Tiffany's was sold for £467,200 at Christie's South Kensington.
- In 2006, controversy arose after Christie's auctioned artefacts known to be looted from Bulgaria.
- Over a three-day sale in Paris in February 2009, Christie's auctioned the monumental private collection of Yves Saint Laurent and Pierre Bergé for a record-breaking 370M euros. It was the most expensive private collection ever sold at auction, breaking auction records for Brâncuși, Matisse, and Mondrian. The "Dragons" armchair by Irish furniture designer Eileen Gray sold for 21.9M euros, setting an auction record for a piece of 20th century decorative art.
- On 18 April 2012, the silver cup given to the marathon winner, Greek athlete Spyridon Louis, at the first modern Olympic Games staged in Athens in 1896 sold for £541,250, breaking the auction record for Olympic memorabilia.
- On 11 November 2017, a Patek Philippe Titanium wristwatch Ref. 5208T-010 was sold for $6.226M (CHF6,200,000) in Geneva, making it one of the most expensive watches ever sold at auction.
- In March 2021, Beeple's Everydays: the First 5000 Days, his 13-year collage of a new piece of digital art by him every day for 5,000 days starting in May 2007, sold as an NFT for $69.3 million. This was the highest price ever paid for an NFT, and the sale brought legitimacy to NFTs and exposure to the broader public. This was also Christie's first offering of an NFT for sale, and its first acceptance of cryptocurrency as payment.
- In September and October 2022 at Christie's, the James Bond film franchise auctioned 61 lots of vehicles, watches, costumes, props, posters, and memorabilia from the 25 Bond films. The auction raised nearly £7M from 28 countries, and proceeds went to more than 45 charities.

== Criticism ==
=== Price-fixing scandal in 2000 ===
In 2000, allegations surfaced of a price-fixing arrangement between Christie's and Sotheby's. Executives from Christie's subsequently alerted the Department of Justice of their suspicions of commission-fixing collusion.

Christie's gained immunity from prosecution in the United States as a longtime employee of Christie's confessed and cooperated with the US Federal Bureau of Investigation. Numerous members of Sotheby's senior management were fired soon thereafter, and A. Alfred Taubman, the largest shareholder of Sotheby's at the time, took most of the blame; he and Dede Brooks (the CEO) were given jail sentences, and Christie's, Sotheby's and their owners also paid a civil lawsuit settlement of $512M.

=== Insufficient or invalid provenance for looted works ===
Christie's has been criticised for "an embarrassing history of a lack of transparency around provenance". In 2003, Christie's was criticised for its handling of two Nazi-looted artworks claimed by heirs of the original Jewish owners. In one case, it refused to divulge to the heirs the location of an Italian painting formerly owned by Jewish Viennese banker Heinrich Graf, looted by the Gestapo. Christie's eventually revealed the holder's name after the Jewish Community of Vienna filed a successful suit in the UK on behalf of Graf's American daughters in late 2004. In the other 2003 case Christie's declined to inform the family that it had discovered that a painting consigned to it had been looted from Ulla and Moriz Rosenthal, a Jewish couple murdered in Auschwitz.

On 19 May 2020, the craft supply company Hobby Lobby, who purchased material for loan or donation to The Museum of the Bible, filed a diversity action on the auction house regarding the sale and purchase of the Gilgamesh tablet by private sale agreement on 14 July 2014, allegedly while knowing the Iraqi-origin cuneiform object had a fake provenance. In June 2020, they were forced to withdraw four Greek and Roman antiquities from sale after it was discovered that they came from "sites linked to convicted antiquities traffickers". The same month, they were criticised for putting up a Benin plaque and two Igbo alusi figures for auction. The plaque was tied to similar plaques taken from Nigeria during the Benin Expedition of 1897 and remained unsold after an auction was held. The alusi figures are alleged to have been taken from Nigeria during the Nigerian Civil War and were sold for €212,500 (after fees), below their low estimate of €250,000. Christie's claims to require "verifiable documented provenance that the object was taken out of its source nation prior to the earlier date of 2000, or the date which is legally applicable between the country in which the sale takes place and the source nation".

In November 2014, Christie's had to withdraw a prehistoric sculpture from Sardinia, valued at $800,000–$1.2m, put on auction by Michael Steinhardt, a US-billionaire, who was given a lifetime ban on acquiring further antiquities by the Manhattan district attorney's office in 2021. After having acquired artworks with unverified provenance for years, for example by convicted art dealer Giacomo Medici, Steinhardt's collection had been subjected to search warrants and investigations since 2017. He finally surrendered 180 looted and illegally smuggled antiquities valued at $70m. According to The Guardian, the district attorney said: "For decades, Michael Steinhardt displayed a rapacious appetite for plundered artefacts without concern for the legality of his actions, the legitimacy of the pieces he bought and sold or the grievous cultural damage he wrought across the globe.

In February 2023 a French court ordered Christie's to unconditionally restitute Dutch painting The Penitent Magdalene, signed Adriaen van der Werff (1707), looted in 1942 from Lionel Hauser in Paris and last sold by the auction house without any provenance in London in April 2005. Christie's had offered the Hauser heirs 50 per cent of the sale price; the heirs refused the offer and took the case to court.

== Blockchain Technology at Auctions ==
In 2018, Christie's began offering "digital passports" stored on the blockchain to a select number of private collectors purchasing art. These "certificates of ownership" gave the buyer a clear and transparent provenance record of the piece of art they were purchasing, a record that could never be erased or manipulated, and accessible worldwide.

Six years later in October 2024, two Christie's auctions exhibited this block-chain technology in the most public events to date. In the first, on 2 October, Christie's New York showcased the work of Diane Arbus and Cindy Sherman in An Eye Towards the Real: Photographs from the Collection of Ambassador Trevor Traina – a former U.S. ambassador to Austria and founder of the web3 wallet provider Kresus. Eight days later, on 10 October, Christie's New York auctioned Ascend, a digital work created by Ryan Koopmans and Alice Wexell, marking the first time a piece inscribed on Bitcoin's Ordinals protocol had been sold in a live auction at Christie’s. Christie's sees this "integration of physical and digital ownership" as the future of art auctioning, and the most efficient way for buyers to know they've purchased a work with as accurate and secure a provenance as possible.

== Christie's Fine Art Storage Services (CFASS) ==
Christie's first ventured into storage services for outside clients in 1984, when it opened a 100,000 square feet brick warehouse in London that was granted "Exempted Status" by HM Revenue and Customs, meaning that property may be imported into the United Kingdom and stored without incurring import duties and VAT. Christie's Fine Art Storage Services, or CFASS, is a wholly owned subsidiary that runs Christie's storage operation.

In September 2008, Christie's signed a 50-year lease on an early 1900s warehouse of the historic N.Y.D. Company in Red Hook, Brooklyn, and subsequently spent $30M converting it into a six-storey, 250,000 square feet art-storage facility. The facility opened in 2010 and features high-tech security and climate controls that maintain a virtually constant 70° and 50% relative humidity.

Located near the Upper Bay tidal waterway near the Atlantic Ocean, the Brooklyn facility was hit by at least one storm surge during Hurricane Sandy in 2012. CFASS subsequently faced client defections and complaints arising from damage to works of art. In 2013, Axa Art Insurance filed a lawsuit in New York court alleging that CFASS' "gross negligence" during the hurricane damaged art collected by late cellist Gregor Piatigorsky and his wife Jacqueline Rebecca Louise de Rothschild. Later that year, StarNet Insurance Co., the insurer for the LeRoy Neiman Foundation and the artist's estate, also filed a lawsuit in New York Supreme Court claiming that the storage company's negligence caused more than $10M in damages to Neiman's art.

== Educational and other ventures ==
Christie's Education previously offered master's degree programs in London and New York, but they were planned to be phased out in 2019. In 2020, in the aftermath of the murder of George Floyd, Christie's noted that there was a lack of racial diversity in the art world, and admitted that Christie's degree programs only exacerbated these inequities.

However, Christie's continue to offer non-degree programmes in London, New York, Hong Kong and Amsterdam as well as online. In addition they offer an Art Business Masterclass Certificate and the Luxury Masterclass Certificate.

With Bonhams, Christie's is a shareholder in the London-based Art Loss Register, a privately owned database used by law enforcement services worldwide to trace and recover stolen art.

== Management ==
Since its acquisition by François Pinault, Christie's CEOs have been as follows:

- 1999–2010: Edward Dolman
- 2010–2014: Steven Murphy
- 2014–2017: Patricia Barbizet
- 2017–2025: Guillaume Cerutti
- 2025–present: Bonnie Brennan

== See also ==
- List of oldest fine art auction houses

== Bibliography ==
- J. Herbert, Inside Christie's, London, 1990 (ISBN 978-0340430439)
- P. A. Colson, The Story of Christie's, London, 1950
- H. C. Marillier, Christie's, 1766–1925, London, 1926
- M. A. Michael, A Brief History of Christie's Education... , London, 2008 (ISBN 978-0955780707)
- W. Roberts, Memorials of Christie's, 2 vols, London, 1897
- "Going Once." Phaidon Press, 2016. ISBN 978-0-7148-7202-5.
