= James Christie (auctioneer) =

18th-century British auctioneer

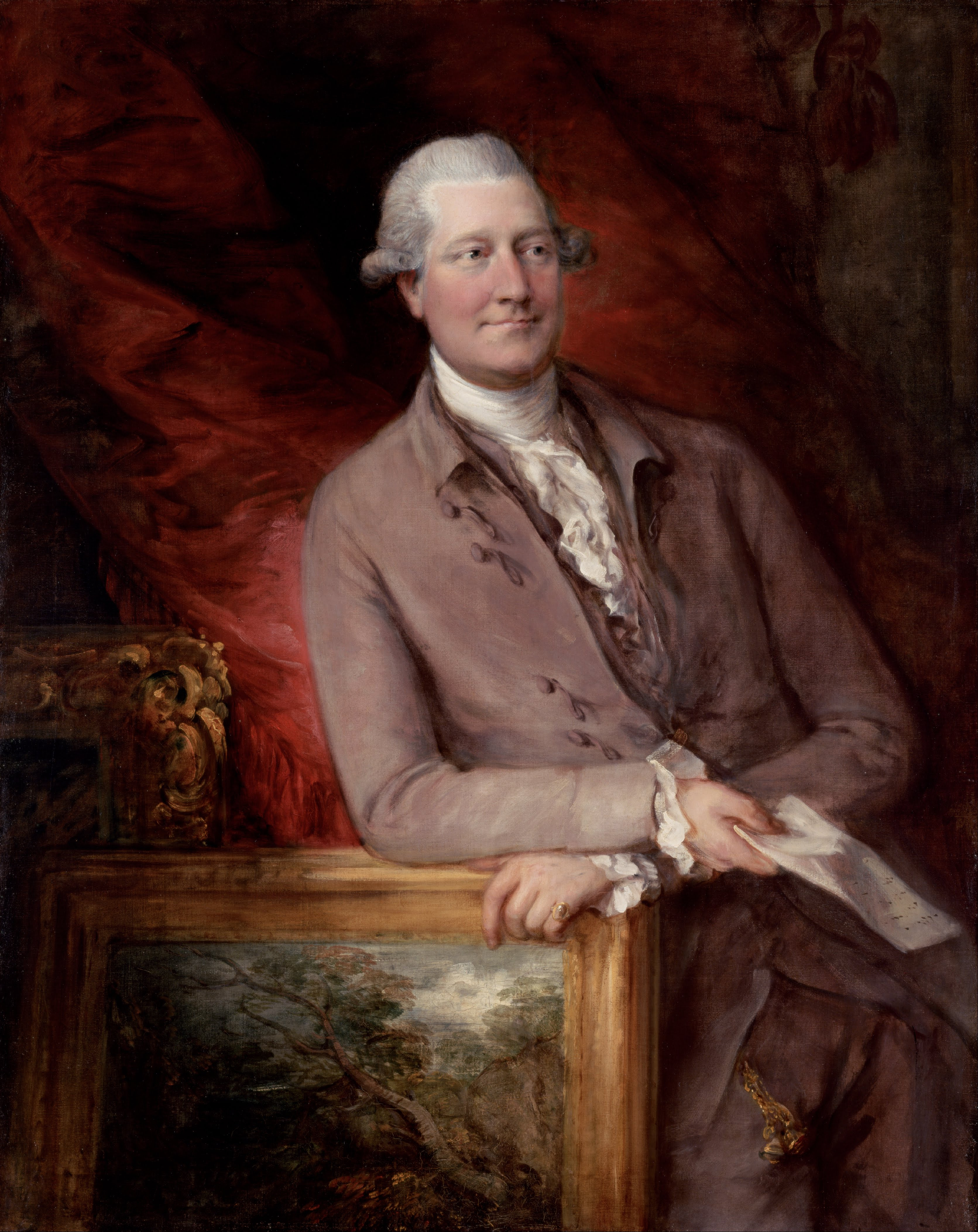
- Portrait of James Christie by Thomas Gainsborough, 1778
- Born: 1730; Perth, Scotland
- Died: 1803 (aged 72–73); Pall Mall, London, England
- Occupation: Auctioneer

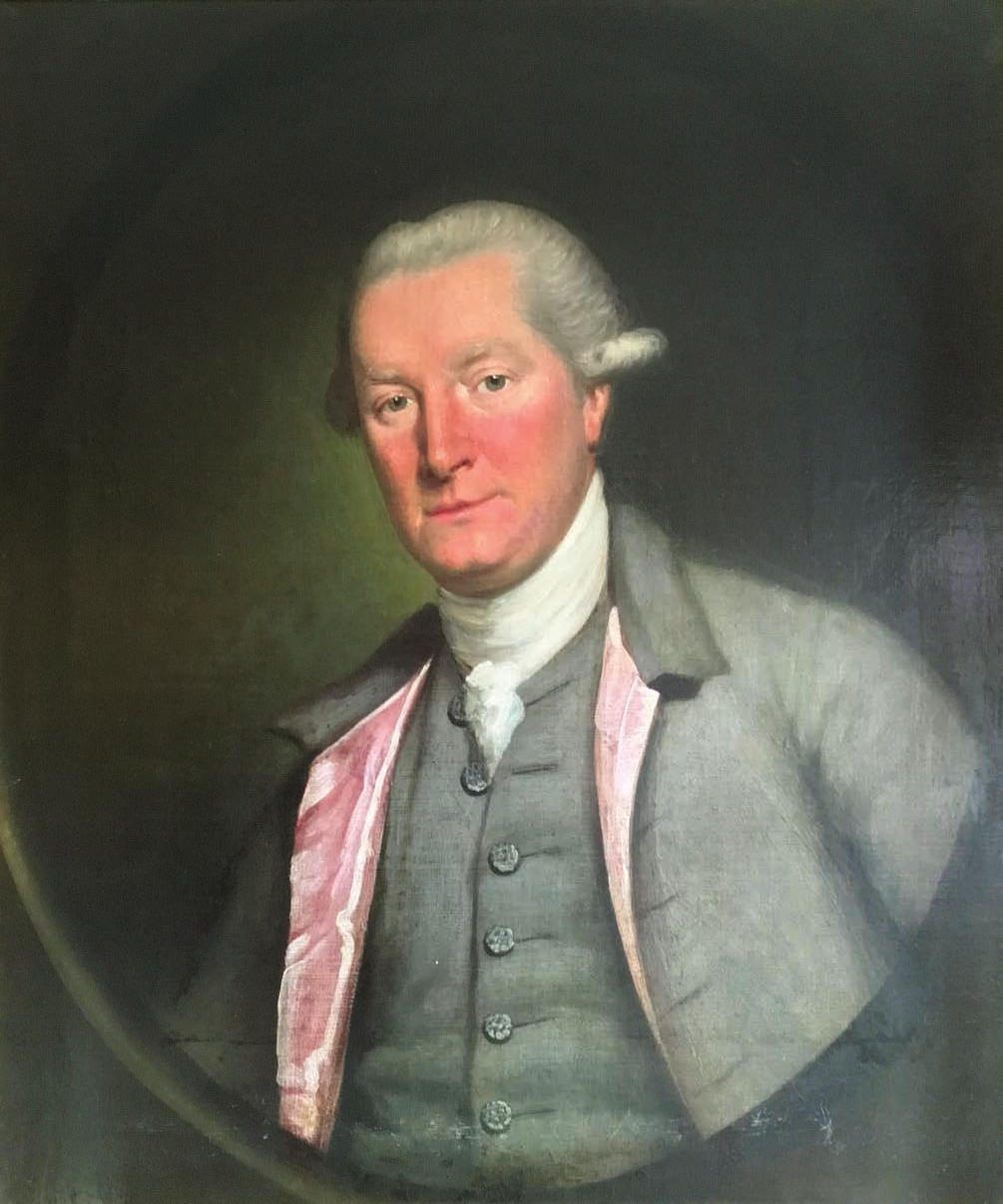
Oil portrait of James Christie, attributed to Benjamin Vandergucht.

James Christie (1730–1803) was a Scottish auctioneer who founded the auction house Christie's.

== Biography ==
Born 1730 in Perth, Scotland, Christie went on to found Christie's auctioneers on 5 December 1766. Situated at Pall Mall in London, England, Christie's Great Rooms dealt with some of the most important sales of the late-eighteenth century.

His first sale took place on 5 December 1766, at rooms in Pall Mall, formerly occupied by the print warehouse of Richard Dalton. On these premises the exhibitions of the Royal Academy of Arts were held until 1779. Christie afterwards moved next door to Thomas Gainsborough, who lived in the western wing of Schomberg House.

Christie was described as tall, intimate with David Garrick, Joshua Reynolds, Gainsborough, and other men of note.

He died at his house in Pall Mall on 8 November 1803, aged 73, and was buried in the burial ground of St James's Church, Piccadilly, which was located some way from the church, beside Hampstead Road, Camden, London. His remains were excavated as part of the High Speed 2 project prior to reburial.

== Family ==
Christie married twice. From his first marriage he had four sons, of whom the eldest, James Christie the Younger (1773–1831), succeeded him; the second, Charles, captain in the 5th regiment of Bengal Native Infantry, was killed (1812) in Persia during a Russian attack; the third, Albany, died in 1821; and Edward, the fourth son, died a midshipman at Port Royal, Jamaica, 1821.

== Sources ==
This article incorporates text from a publication now in the public domain: Tedder, Henry Richard (1887). "Christie, James (1730–1803)". In Stephen, Leslie (ed.). Dictionary of National Biography. Vol. 10. London: Smith, Elder & Co.
