= Guillaume Cerutti =

French business executive (born 1966)

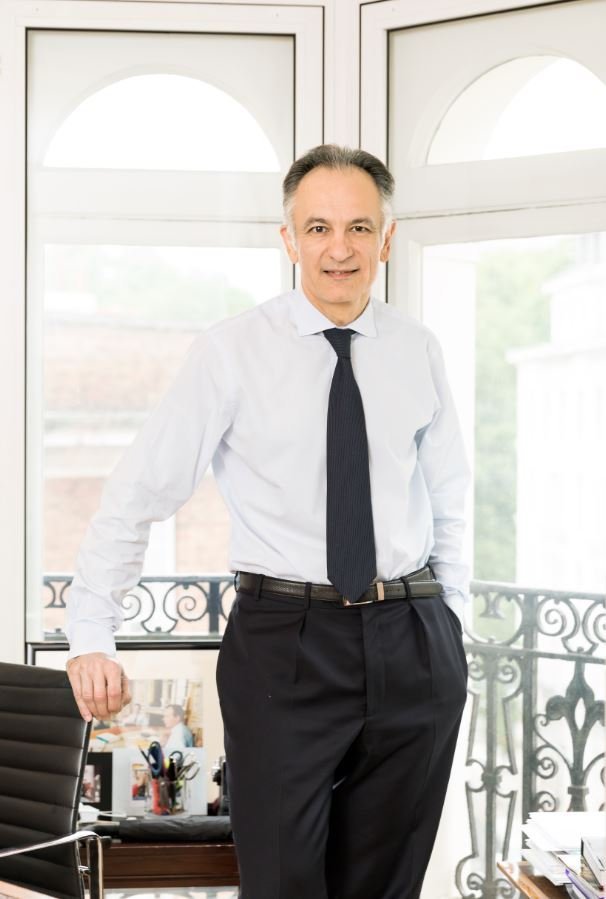
- Guillaume Cerutti
- Born: 20 March 1966 (age 60); La Ciotat, France
- Education: Sciences Po; Ecole Nationale d'Administration
- Occupation: Business executive
- Employer: Artémis
- Title: Chairman, Christie's; Chairman, Stade Rennais Football Club
- Children: 4

Guillaume Cerutti (born 20 March 1966) is a French business executive and former senior civil servant. He has been the chairman of Christie's auction house since 2023. In 2025, he succeeded François Pinault as president of the Pinault Collection; in March 2026 he stepped down from that role.

He was managing director of the Centre Georges Pompidou from 1996 and 2001. From 2002 to 2004, he served as chief of staff for the French Minister of Culture Jean-Jacques Aillagon, and afterwards worked in France's Finance Ministry. He was the chief executive officer of Sotheby's France from 2007 to 2011 and deputy chairman of Sotheby's Europe until 2015, and CEO of Christie's from 2017 to 2025.

== Early life and career ==
Guillaume Cerutti was born on 20 March 1966 in La Ciotat, France. He studied in Paris, attending the Institut d’Études Politiques and the Ecole Nationale d'Administration. Early in his career, he held a number of administrative positions. He was the managing director of the Centre Georges Pompidou from 1996 until 2001, overseeing the renovation of the Musée National d'Art Moderne.

From 2002 to 2004, he was the chief of staff for the French Minister of Culture Jean-Jacques Aillagon. After Aillagon's tenure, Cerutti took a role in the French Ministry of Economy and Finance, serving as head of the executive office for consumerism and competition from 2008 until 2011.

== Career in the private sector ==
Cerutti was named president-director of Sotheby's France in September 2007, after being recommended to the auction house by Jean-Jacques Aillagon. He became vice president for Sotheby's Europe in 2011, and by 2015, he was both deputy chairman of Sotheby's Europe and CEO of Sotheby's France. Sotheby's achieved the highest art sales on the French market during his tenure, particularly with the help of several French art collections sold in Paris, London and New York.

In August 2015, Les Echos reported that he would become president of Christie's for London, Continental Europe, the Middle East, India, and Russia (Christie's EMERI), taking the post in 2016 after a non-compete clause expired. He was subsequently named CEO of Christie's on January 1, 2017, succeeding Patricia Barbizet. Upon becoming CEO, Cerutti implemented a restructuring. One of his first actions was closing Christie's lower-value outlet in South Kensington and scaling back Christie's operations in Amsterdam. He redirected funds to newer facilities in Asia and Los Angeles.

After becoming Christie's CEO, he oversaw a number of auctions for high-profile collections, several of which broke world price records. In 2017, he oversaw the sale of Leonardo da Vinci's Salvator Mundi at Christie's New York for $450.3 million, breaking the price record for artwork sold at auction. In late 2022, he oversaw Christie's auction of Paul Allen's art collection, the Paul G. Allen Collection, which sold for $1.6 billion that November, making it the biggest sale in world auction history. In 2021, Cerutti oversaw the sale of Beeple's Everydays: the First 5000 Days, Christie's first NFT auction. After overseeing the sale of other NFTs through Christie's, including several Cryptopunks, the Wall Street Journal reported in July 2023 that he remained "bullish on NFTs" and their value.

Cerutti became chairman of Christie's in 2023. He stepped down as CEO in February 2025 and transitioned to oversee a broader range of responsibilities within the Pinault family's art-related projects, becoming the president of the Pinault Collection. He stepped down as president in March 2026.

== Board and organizations ==
Since 2015, Cerutti has been chairman of the Fondation Nationale des Arts Graphiques et Plastiques (FNAGP). He was on the audit committee of Flamel Technologies, a pharmaceuticals company, as of late 2016. He has been chairman of non-profit organizations in the cultural field, including the Accentus Chamber Choir (2007–2012), the Ecole Nationale Supérieure de la Photographie in Arles (2009–2010) and the Institute pour le Financement du Cinéma et des Industries Culturelles (2010–2016).

== Writing ==
Cerutti is the author of La politique culturelle, un enjeu du XXIème siècle, 20 propositions, published in October 2016. He has published articles on cultural politics in publications such as Commentaire, Le Monde, Les Échos, and L'Opinion.

== Personal life ==
Cerutti is married with three daughters, and as of 2023, resides in London.

== Publishing history ==
- Cultural policy, a challenge of the 21st century - twenty proposals (12 October 2016), Odile Jacob, ISBN 978-2-7381-3469-1
