= Steven Murphy =

American business executive (born 1954)

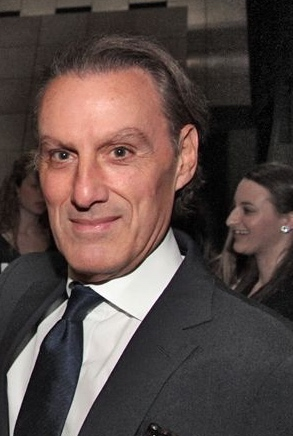
- Murphy in 2012
- Born: March 1954 (age 72)
- Education: Georgetown University
- Occupation: Businessman
- Known for: Previously CEO of Christie's
- Spouse: Ann Pleshette Murphy

Steven Murphy (born March 1954) is an American business executive and prominent figure in the international art market. Previously CEO of Christie's, and before that, publishing firm Rodale in Emmaus, Pennsylvania, Murphy is currently Managing Partner at London-based Murphy & Partners.

== Early life ==
Steven Pleshette Murphy was born in March 1954. He graduated from Georgetown University, Washington, D.C., with a bachelor's in English literature.

== Career ==
Murphy worked at the publisher's Simon & Schuster from 1985, serving as a division president until 1991, when he joined EMI / Angel Records as its president. His tenure at EMI ended in 1998 with his appointment to Disney Publishing Worldwide as managing director.

He joined the privately held publishing firm Rodale, Inc. in 2000 as COO and president, and subsequently became the first non-family member to be appointed CEO, in 2002. Credited with the turnaround of Rodale's fortunes, notable events during his time there included the publishing of its first big success, The South Beach Diet, Al Gore's An Inconvenient Truth, and the growth of magazine title Men’s Health. According to the company, it experienced its most profitable period under his decade long tenure.

In 2004 he was named one of BusinessWeek’s Top 25 Best Managers of the Year.

In 2010 Murphy was appointed CEO of Christie's. He was hired to bring the auction house online and expand its sales in the Far East and other new markets. He spent $50 million on expanding the company's internet presence and infrastructure, including the hiring of experts. His departure from Christie's in 2014 drew some speculation as to the success of his tenure, despite happening not long after Christie's achieved the biggest single art auction sale value in history - selling $853 million worth of contemporary and post-war art.

Murphy was on the board of directors of Ralph Lauren from 2005 to 2010, stepping down to act as a strategic consultant to the management.

In 2015 Murphy founded the international art advisory, Murphy & Partners.

Murphy was appointed to the board of trustees for the Victoria and Albert Museum for a period of four years from 1 January 2017.

== Personal life ==
Murphy is married to the parenting counselor and author, Ann Pleshette Murphy.
