= James Christie the Younger =

English antiquarian and auctioneer

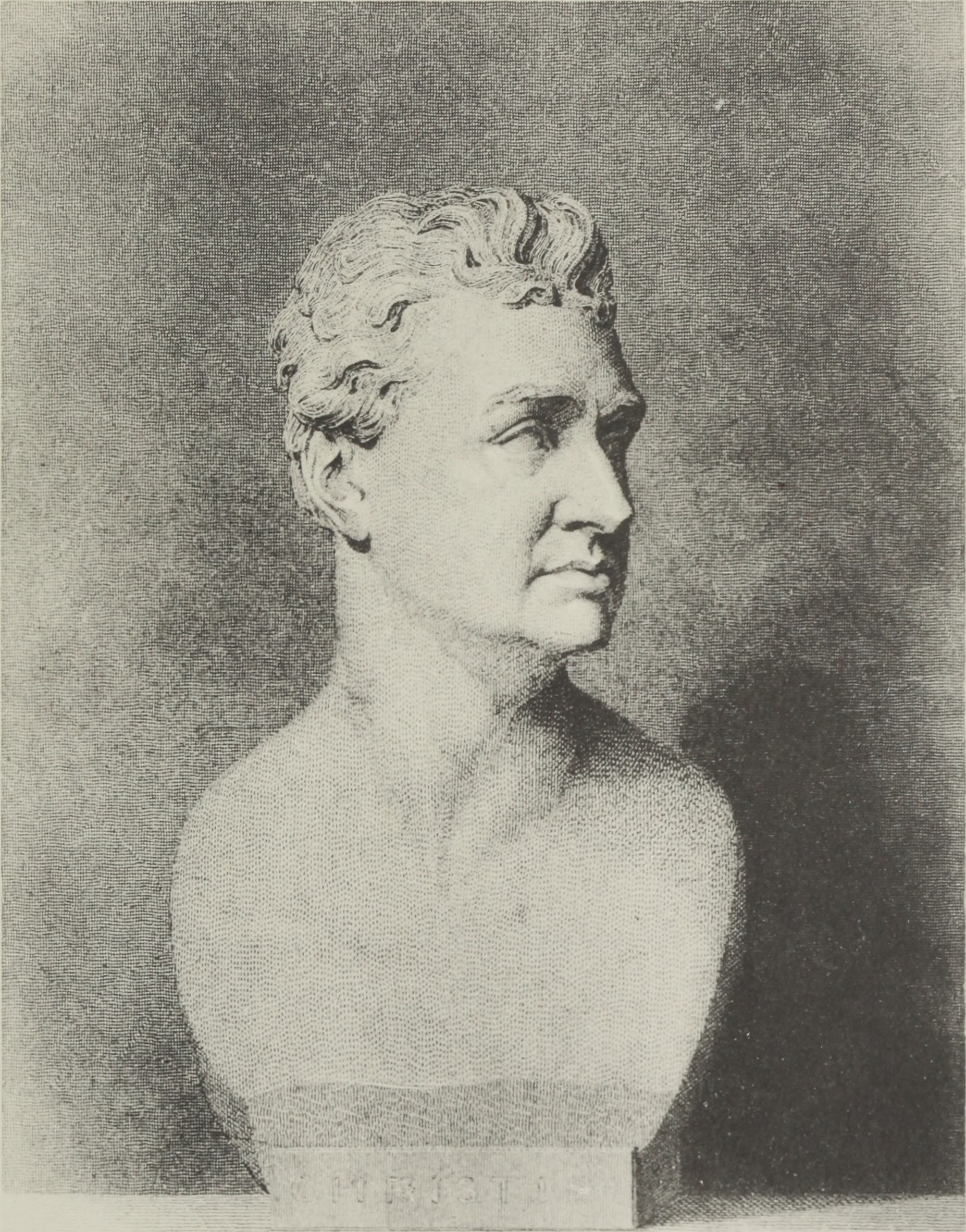
Bust of James Christie the Younger, William Behnes, 1826.

James Christie the Younger (1773–1831) was an English antiquarian, auctioneer, and eldest son of James Christie, founder of Christie's.

Though his family didn't originally intend for him to go into the business, Christie followed in his father's footsteps to become an auctioneer. He gained a good reputation in this profession, even if considered a less careful dealer and a more solitary businessman than his father. Through his work at Christie's, he "consolidated its dominance of the London fine art auctioneering scene", continuing his father's work there. He oversaw several notable sales at the auction house, and passed the business along to his son, ultimately ensuring it remained in the family until 1889.

Aside from his work as a businessman, Christie was an amateur classical scholar. He produced works on the Greek origins of Chess, Etruscan vase painting, elemental themes in Paganism, and Ancient Greek sculpture, for which he received generally favourable reviews. He befriended several notable contemporary scholars, such as Sir John Soane and Charles Townley, who encouraged his studies and provided him with rare antiquities.

== Early life ==
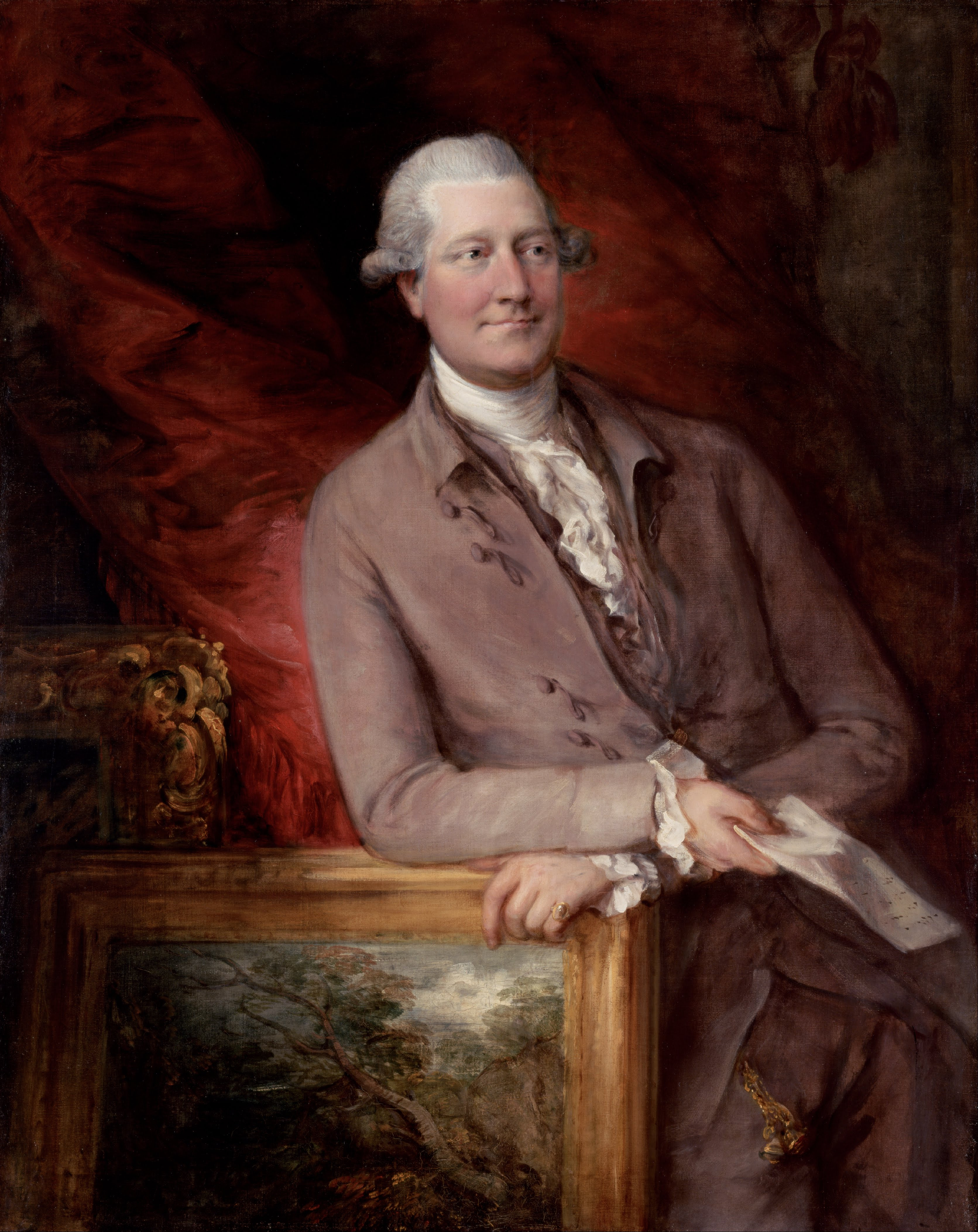
Portrait of James Christie the Elder by Thomas Gainsborough, 1778.

James Christie was born in 1773, in Pall Mall, London, as the eldest son to James Christie the Elder, a prominent and successful auctioneer of London. (2019) He was educated at Eton College, where his family planned for him to take up an ecclesiastical career. Here, he entertained classical interests and his obituary reported that "he passed through that school with a reputation honourable". After his father's death in 1803, he abandoned the church, and took over the family business.

== Auctioneering ==
He treads in shoes of great Papa,
And tells alike — untruths comme ça:
For Auctioneer would give emetic
That was not vers'd in prose-poetic;

— Satiricus Sculptor, 'Chr—st—e', Chalcographimania (1814)

While under James Christie's control, Christie's "consolidated its dominance of the London fine art auctioneering scene", according to Oxford Dictionary of National Biographer contributor Francis Russell. While few sales reached the dramatic heights of his father's tenure, Christie oversaw several notable sales in the auction house, including: William Young Ottley's collection of Italian Primitives in 1811, the models of Joseph Nollekens in 1823, and the large art collection of Thomas Lawrence in 1830. Unlike his father, who had several business partners throughout his life, Christie worked alone as an auctioneer, even as the firm expanded rapidly.

Christie's auctioneering skills were well received, though not as highly as his father's. William Roberts, in his history of Christie's, claimed his "success as an auctioneer was only one degree less than his abilities as an author". William Henry Ireland (under the pseudonym 'Satiricus Sculptor, Esq.'), in his satire Chalcographimania (1814), favourably described Christie's skills as a dealer, being "the most classical of our auctioneering fraternity, having been gifted with scholastic education [...] As a vendor he ranks very fair". Despite this, he ridicules Christie for mistaking a painting of Frans Floris (under the name 'Florus') for a "chef-d'œuvre — Florentine", an anecdote he refers to as "supris[ing]" for Christie's "knowledge of several schools of painting", while hinting at his inferiority to his father. His obituary claimed he "raised the business he followed to the dignity of a profession", through his diligent study and "undisputed" taste in fine art.

== Scholarship and antiquarianism ==
Outside from his family business, Christie was a committed historical and classical scholar. His first publication was An Inquiry Into the Ancient Greek Game (1801), a study on the origins of Chess claiming to find its origins in Ancient Greece, specifically the game of Petteia, and of "pastoral origin", i.e. the product of gradually improved folk tradition rather than one man's invention. The British Critic, approved of the book, having "certainly employed much learning and acuteness", they gave "high commendation to the classical turn and taste of the whole volume", though the work was criticised for some careless mistakes. Charles Tomlinson, in his brief history in Amusements in Chess (1845), quotes Christie at length and refers to his arguments as "ingenious".

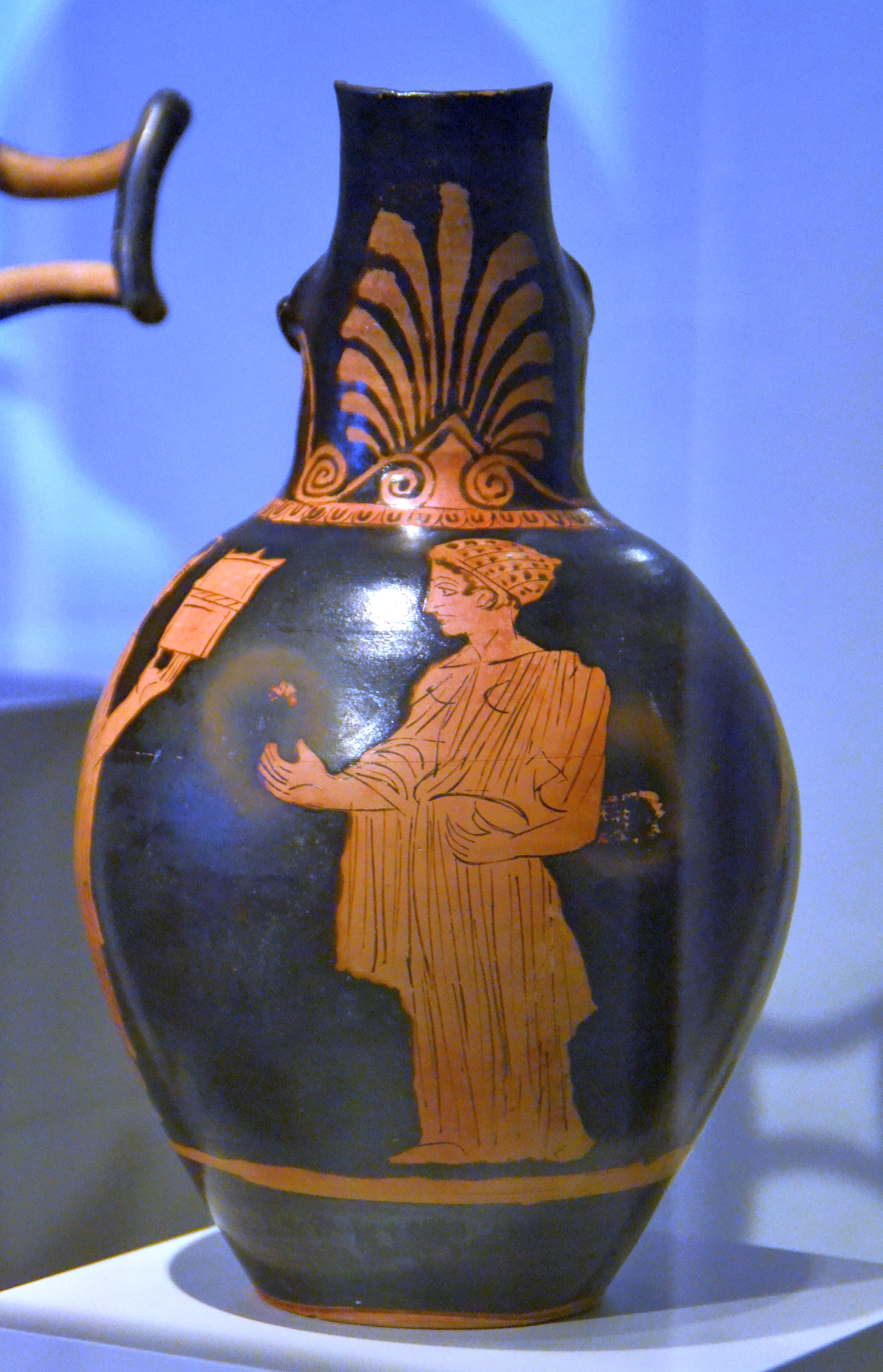
Christie considered "the Etruscan vases with red figures upon a black ground" as proof of his thesis that the vases began as representations of "transparent figures" used in religious plays.

Christie befriended the prominent classical collector Charles Towneley, who encouraged him in the study of Etruscan vase painting. The product of this study was A Disquisition upon Etruscan Vases (1806), printed privately and anonymously, and later republished as Disquisitions upon the painted Greek Vases (1825) under his name, with several sections expanded. The book attempted to prove the origins of the vase's figures in the Eleusinian Mysteries, speculating that the vases were representations of puppets used in religious plays, in which "dark superficies, in which transparent figures were placed," or "opake figures, moved behind a transparent canvas," were used, and that vase painters were hired to "trace [...] these phantasmagoric shadow projections" as funerary memorials for cult initiates. Additionally Christie created a Linnaean system of classification for these vases, now "generally regarded as his more lasting contribution" according to Noah Heringman. The 1810 The Monthly Review assessed Christie's book favourably as "highly interesting to the classical antiquary", though the reviewer notes that it "involves a great variety of curious subjects, all bearing more or less relation to the principal point" and "presupposes in its reader so much acquaintance with the mixed character of heathen mythology". The Gentleman's Magazine was equally impressed, "allow[ing] every credit to the ingenuity and sagacity of Mr. Christie", though they lament that "most of the ancient vases must remain unintelligible [...] therefore, Mr. Christie succeeds in some instances and fails in others, [and] no man living can do more."

The next work Christie produced concerned pagan religions, entitled An Essay on that Earliest Species of Idolatry: The Worship of the Elements (1814). This book surveyed elemental themes from many early European and Asian religions, notably including Chinese conceptions of the elements, which were the subjects of two coloured plates. The essay received a mixed review from The Monthly Review, praised as "generally founded on arguments that are at least plausible, and often on convincing facts", but criticised for Christie's "disposition to refer everything in Pagan antiquity to a scriptural origin". In 1822, Christie's considerations on a massive vase found in Hadrian's Villa, 'Dissertation on the Lanti Vase', were published in Outline Engravings, and Descriptions of the Woburn Abbey Marbles (1822) as an appendix. This vase was an exemplary piece of Greek pottery, decorated with classical masks and theatrical scenes, which had formerly been owned by the Lanti family.

Alongside these historical interests, Christie had interests in fine art, poetry, and biblical studies. These fine interests were recognised, with his election into the Society of Dilettanti in 1824, a society of well-to-do classical scholars, and the Athenaeum in 1826. He was also the registrar of the Royal Literary Fund for several years, a society which he contributed to considerably, and a member of the Society of Antiquaries of Newcastle upon Tyne, one of the oldest societies of its kind.

Posthumously, his work on the history of Ancient Greek sculpture, An Inquiry into the Early History of Greek Sculpture (1833), was published by his son, James Stirling. The book was printed in 50 copies, for private circulation, though it had originally been intended as an introduction for the Dilettanti Society's Specimens of Ancient Sculpture, Vol. 2 (1836). After Christie's death, the society's committee had decided against such a speculative essay for the volume's introduction, so it was scrapped in favour of an essay by another member, Richard Payne Knight.

== Personal life and death ==
According to Ireland, "in private life his character will stand the test of the most minute inquiry". Christie befriended several contemporary scholars of note, all "of great moral and intellectual note" according to his obituary. Christie was a good friend of the Freemason and architect Sir John Soane, who shared his interests in ancient religions and cults. Christie sent several of copies of his books to Soane, and Soane invited Christie to the opening of the tomb of Pharaoh Seti I by lamplight, which Christie missed, lamenting that it "would be so particularly interesting to me as it would coincide so nearly with my speculations upon the lamplight exhibitions at Eleusis". Two contemporary portraits were made of Christie, an 1826 bust by William Behnes, which both Henry Corbould and Robert Graves sketched, and a 1821 drawing by E. Turner, now stored at the Victoria and Albert Museum.

In 1824 he moved to 8 King Street, St James's Square, London, where Christie's "Great Rooms" had moved in the fall of 1823. After a prolonged illness, Christie died at his house on 2 February 1831, at the age of fifty-eight. His obituary was published in The Gentleman's Magazine. He left two sons George Henry Christie (d. 1887) and James Stirling (d. 1834). The eldest, George, took over Christie's business, partnering with Thomas H. Woods (d. 1906) and William Manson. James Christie the Younger's grandson, James H. B. Christie, was the last Christie to have a connection with the firm, and retired in 1889. From thereon, Christie's was no longer a family business.

== Sources ==
- "Obituary: James Christie, Esq". The Gentleman's Magazine. 101 (1): 471–472. 1831.
- Roberts, William (1897). Memorial of Christie's: A Record of Art Sales from 1766 to 1896, Vol. 1. London: George Bell and Sons.
- Russell, Francis (2004). "Christie, James". Oxford Dictionary of National Biography (online ed.). Oxford University Press. doi:10.1093/ref:odnb/5363. (Subscription or UK public library membership required.)
- Tedder, Henry Richard (1887). "Christie, James (1773-1831)" . In Stephen, Leslie (ed.). Dictionary of National Biography. Vol. 10. London: Smith, Elder & Co.
