= Patricia Barbizet =

French businesswoman

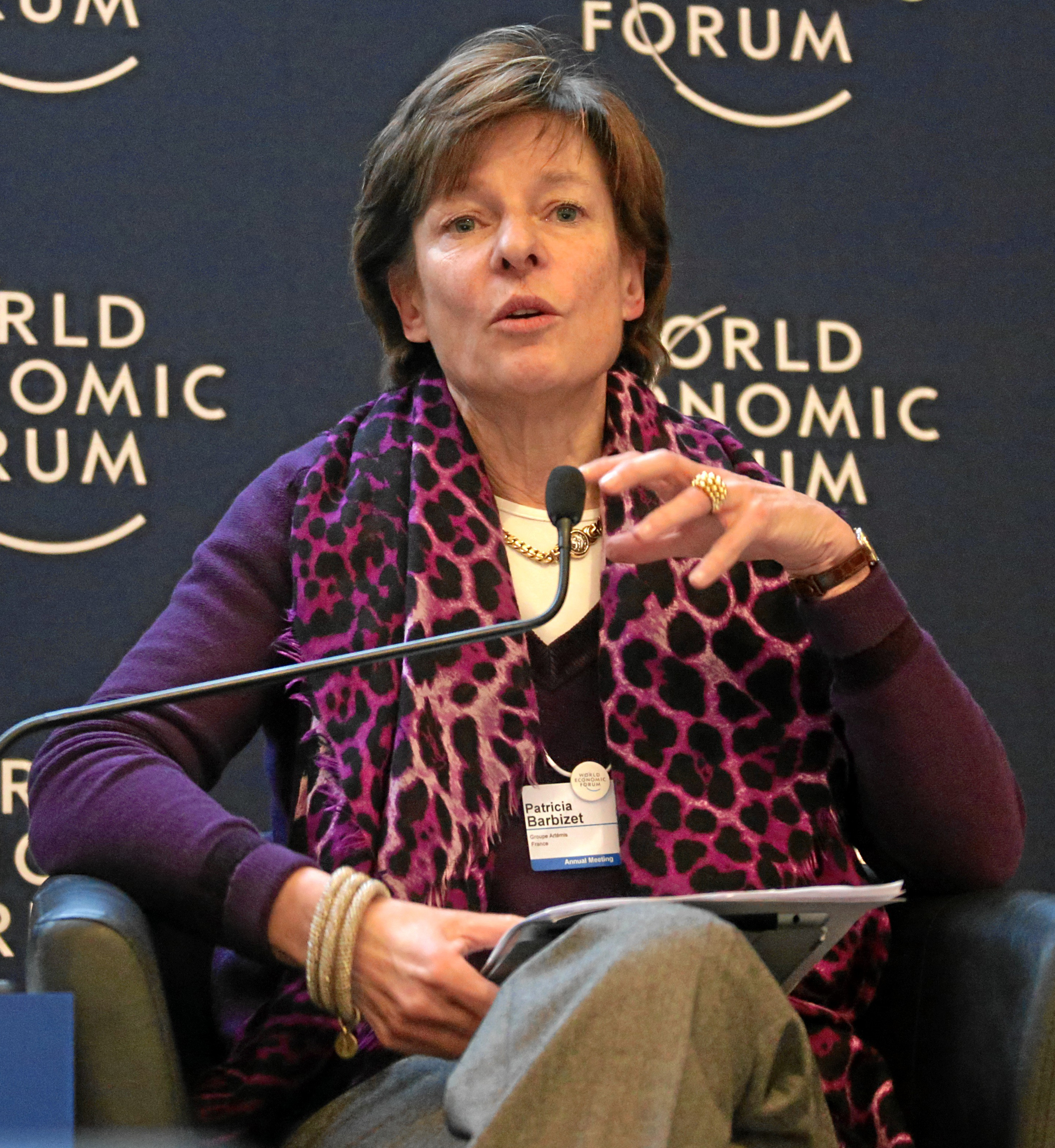
- Patricia Barbizet at the World Economic Forum Annual Meeting in 2013
- Born: 17 April 1955 (age 70); Paris, France
- Education: ESCP Europe
- Occupation: Businesswoman

Patricia Barbizet (born 17 April 1955) is a French businessperson who served as executive director of Groupe Artémis from 1992 to 2017. She was also the chief executive officer of Christie's from 2014 to 2016.

== Early life and education ==
Barbizet graduated from ESCP Europe in 1976.

== Career ==
Barbizet's career began in 1977 as an executive assistant at Renault. She later served as International Treasurer from 1979 to 1982, then as Group Treasurer of Renault Industrial Vehicles (later renamed Renault Trucks) until 1984. From 1984 to 1989, she was CFO of Renault Crédit International and Director of Renault Acceptance BV.

In 1989, she became chief financial officer of the Pinault Group and was later appointed deputy director-general for finance and communication of Pinault-CFAO in 1990. She then became managing director of Groupe Artémis and vice president of the board of Kering (formerly Pinault-Printemps-Redoute). In 2014, she assumed the role of CEO of Christie's after Steven P. Murphy resigned.

Barbizet was appointed head of the Investment Committee of the Strategic Investment Fund, a subsidiary of the Caisse des Dépôts et Consignations, from 2008 to 2013, on the recommendation of Nicolas Sarkozy. She was also named Chairwoman of the French High Committee on Corporate Governance (HCGE) in 2017. In 2017, Barbizet left Artemis.

== Other activities ==
=== Corporate boards ===
- ArcelorMittal, Independent Member of the Board of Directors (since 2023)
- Pernod Ricard, Independent Member of the Board of Directors (since 2019)
- AXA, Independent Member of the Board of Directors (since 2018)
- Total S.A., Independent Member of the Board of Directors (since 2008)
- Groupe PSA, Member of the Board of Directors (2013-2016)
- Air France-KLM, Member of the Board of Directors (2003-2013)
- Bouygues, Member of the Board of Directors (2000-2013)

=== Non-profit organizations ===
- Bilderberg Group, Member of the Steering Committee
- France China Foundation, Member of the Strategic Committee
- Paris Europlace, Member of the Board of Directors
- French Association of Corporate Treasurers (AFTE), President (1980–82)
- Former President and CEO of SEFIMEG
- Member of the Financial Markets Authority (CMF) (1996–2002)

== Recognition ==
In November 2012, Barbizet was honored by the international educational organization Humanity in Action. In 2015, she ranked sixth in Fortune Magazine's 50 Most Powerful Women EMEA.

== Personal life ==
Her husband, Jean Barbizet, former president of Barclays Capital France, oversaw the investment division of Barclays.
