= Domingo García y Vásquez =

Spanish-born Brazilian landscape painter

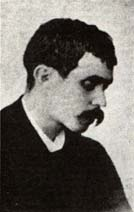
- Born: 1859; Vigo, Spain
- Died: 18 January 1912 (aged 52–53); Rio de Janeiro, Brazil
- Education: Georg Grimm; Academia Imperial de Belas Artes
- Style: plein air painting
- Movement: Grupo Grimm

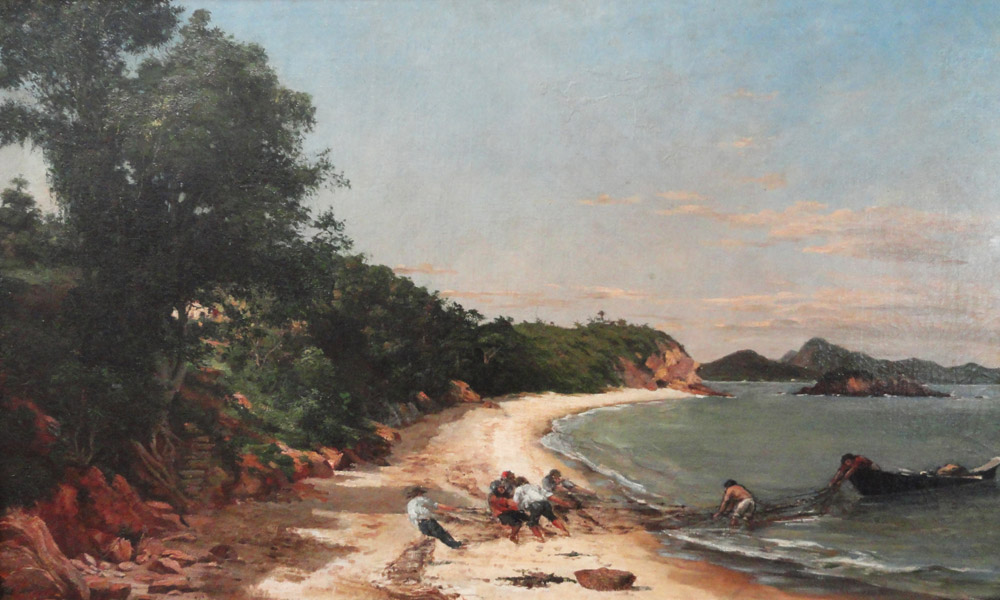
Fishing (1883)

Domingo García y Vásquez (c. 1859 – 1912) was a Spanish-born Brazilian landscape painter.

== Biography ==
His father owned a company in Rio de Janeiro and brought Domingo there to be with him sometime between 1871 and 1876. He was enrolled at the Academia Imperial de Belas Artes (AIBA) from 1879 to 1884, where he became a student of the German landscape painter Georg Grimm.

When Grimm staged a protest against the Academy's teaching methods, García joined him and several other students (including Giovanni Battista Castagneto, Antônio Parreiras and Hipólito Boaventura Caron) in leaving the Academy to establish their own school in Niterói, where they painted plein-air and came to be known as the "Grupo Grimm". This proved to be a very successful time in his life. He was awarded medals at various exhibitions in 1880, 1881, 1882 and won a Gold Medal in 1884. After the Grupo Grimm broke up, he went to France, where he studied with Hector Hanoteau and Henri-Joseph Harpignies from 1885 to 1888.

When he returned from Europe, he discovered that his paintings were no longer very popular in Brazil. Introverted by nature, he became filled with self-doubt and fell into poverty. For much of the nineties, he gave up painting altogether, and spent his time taking long walks along the beach or fishing to earn a little money.

In 1901, he got up the courage to have a small exhibit at the "Exposição Geral de Belas Artes". Four years later, he made a long tour of the Serra da Estrela, in Teresópolis, producing several major works for display at the Exposição in 1906. His paintings were praised, but were not accepted for the exhibition. As a result, he became severely depressed and returned to his aimless behavior. In 1912, he committed suicide during the evening show at the Cinema Soberano on the Rua da Carioca.
