= Hipólito Boaventura Caron =

Brazilian painter and designer

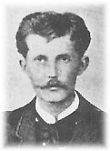
- Born: 27 March 1862; Resende, Empire of Brazil
- Died: 15 May 1892 (aged 30); Juiz de Fora, First Brazilian Republic
- Occupation: Painter
- Movement: Grupo Grimm

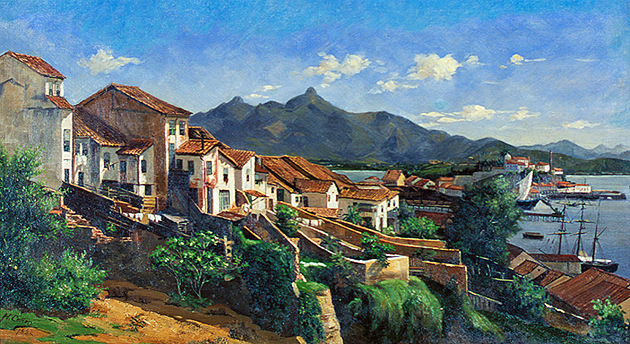
View of Gamboa (1882)

Hipólito Boaventura Caron (1862–1892) was a Brazilian painter and designer associated with the "Grupo Grimm". He is the Patron of the 13th chair of the Brazilian Academy of Fine Arts.

== Biography ==
He began his education at the Colégio Progresso in Juiz de Fora. In 1880, he enrolled at the Academia Imperial de Belas Artes, where he studied with Georg Grimm while he taught elementary drawing classes at the "Liceu de Artes e Ofícios".

In 1883, he had his first exhibition at the Juiz de Fora City Hall. Later that same year, he and several others withdrew from the academy to go to Niterói with Grimm, where they established an outdoor school devoted to plein-air painting. Among his associates there were Giovanni Battista Castagneto, Antônio Parreiras, Domingo García y Vásquez and Grimm's friend from Germany, Thomas Georg Driendl.

In 1884, he won a gold medal at the Exposição Geral de Belas Artes. The following year, thanks to financial assistance from his family, he was able to visit France, where he studied with the landscape painter Hector Hanoteau. He remained there for three years, travelling throughout Brittany and Normandy.

Upon his return, he toured Minas Gerais and received several commissions for decorations, including murals at the old theater in Juiz de Fora and the newspaper offices of O Farol (The Beacon). From 1890 to 1891, he lived in Sabará, which had briefly been the home of his mentor, Grimm. Continuing to travel between Minas Gerais and Juiz de Fora, working on commissions, he returned from one trip ill with yellow fever and died soon after.
