= Estevão =

Male given name

Estevão is a Portuguese male given name, derived from Greek Στέφανος (Stéphanos) and related to the English names Steven and Stephen. It may refer to:

- Estevão Martins de Leomil (fl. 13th century), Portuguese nobleman, Lord of Couto de Leomil
- Estêvão da Gama (15th century) (1430–1497), Portuguese knight and father of Vasco da Gama
- Estêvão da Gama (c. 1470), Portuguese navigator and explorer
- Estêvão Gomes (1483-1538), Portuguese cartographer and explorer
- Estêvão da Gama (16th century) (1505–1576), Portuguese governor of Portuguese Gold Coast and Portuguese India
- Estêvão Pires de Alpoim (1520-1570s), Portuguese nobleman
- Estêvão de Brito (1570–1641), Portuguese composer
- Estêvão Lopes Morago (1575-1630), Spanish composer
- Estêvão Cacella (1585–1630), Portuguese Jesuit missionary
- Estêvão Gonçalves Neto (died 1627), Portuguese priest and artist
- Estevão Molnar (1915–1992), Brazilian fencer
- Estêvão Cardoso de Avellar (1917-2009), Brazilian Catholic bishop
- Estêvão Silva (1844-1891), Brazilian painter and art teacher
- Estevão Mansidão (born 1940), Portuguese football midfielder
- Estevão Toniato (born 1979), Brazilian football defender
- Amilna Estêvão (born 1999), Angolan fashion model
- Estêvão (footballer, born 2002), Brazilian football midfielder for Internacional
- Estêvão Willian (born 2007), Brazilian football winger for Chelsea

== See also ==
- Santo Estêvão (disambiguation)
