= Thomas Georg Driendl =

German painter

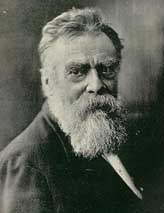
Thomas Georg Driendl (date unknown)

Thomas Georg Driendl (2 April 1849 – February 1916) was a German-born Brazilian painter, architect, and art restorer. He specialized in landscapes, portraits and religious themes.

== Life ==
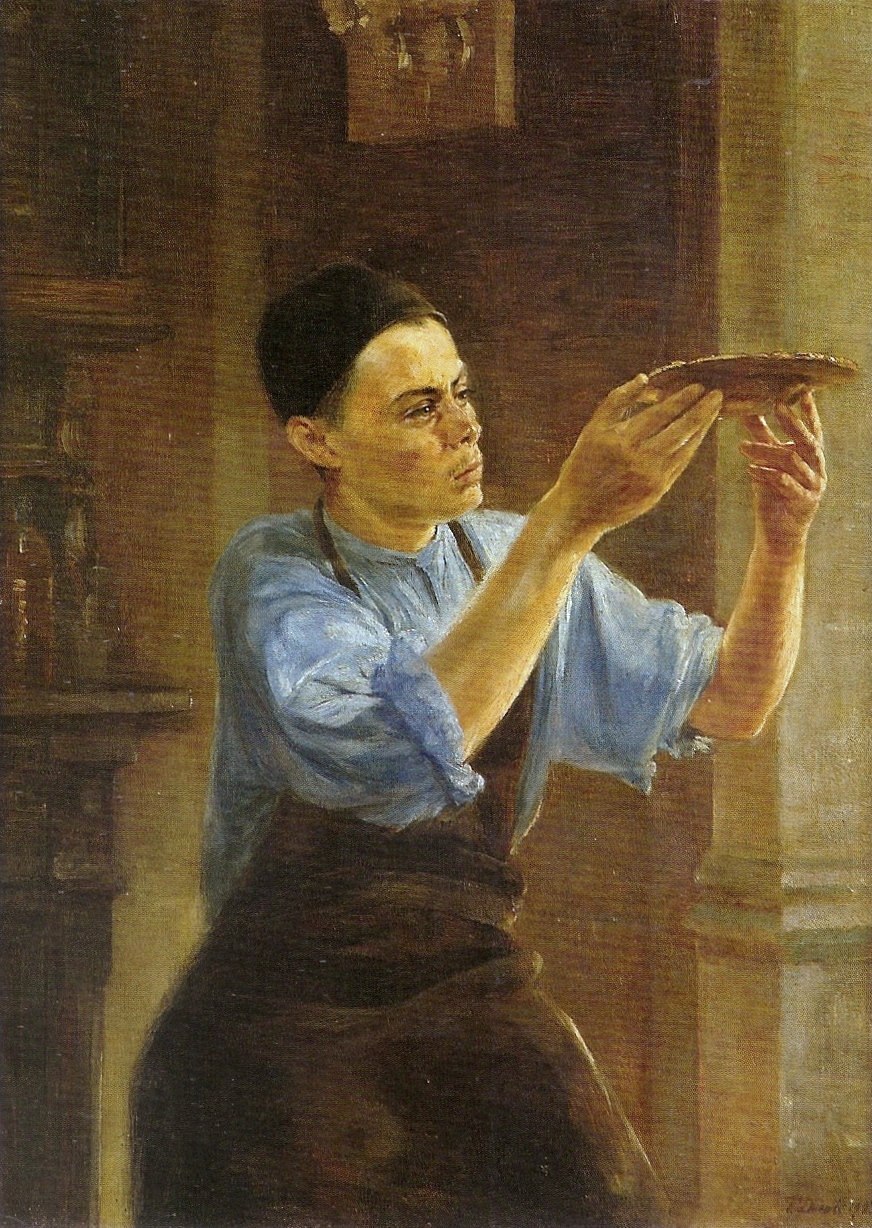
The Silversmith (1892)

He was born in Munich. His father was the lithographer Thomas Driendl (1805–1859). While fighting in the Franco-Prussian War, he met and befriended the painter Georg Grimm. After the war, in 1873, he joined Grimm at the Academy of Fine Arts, Munich, where he enrolled in the class on antiquities.

In June 1881, again following Grimm's advice, he sailed for Brazil, where he became the South American representative of the "Institut für Religiöse Malerei". He eventually settled in Rio de Janeiro, living with Grimm and another painter from Bavaria, although he frequently travelled to São Paulo to perform his duties for the Institut. While there, he also solicited work as a painter, architect and decorator.

In 1882, Driendl had his first exhibition at the "Imperial Liceu de Artes e Ofícios" in Rio de Janeiro and had great success with some canvases he had painted while still living in Germany. This resulted in a commission to decorate the Hall of Fame at the Academy of Portuguese Literature, which he did together with Grimm. The following year, he created stained glass windows for the church of Saint Francis of Paola. In 1884, he entered the "Exposição Geral de Belas Artes" held by the Academia Imperial de Belas Artes and won a Gold Medal.

That same year, Driendl joined Grimm and a group of his students, including Antônio Parreiras, Giovanni Battista Castagneto, Domingo García y Vásquez and Hipólito Boaventura Caron, who left the Academy and formed what became known as the "Grupo Grimm" in Niterói. He remained there as Grimm's assistant until 1886. Two years later, he became a naturalized citizen of Brazil.

Among the many commissions he executed over the following decade may be mentioned the theater curtains at the Teatro Santa Teresa (now the Teatro João Caetano), the altar at the Church of the Immaculate Conception in Botafogo and restorative work at the Church of Saint Francis the Penitent.

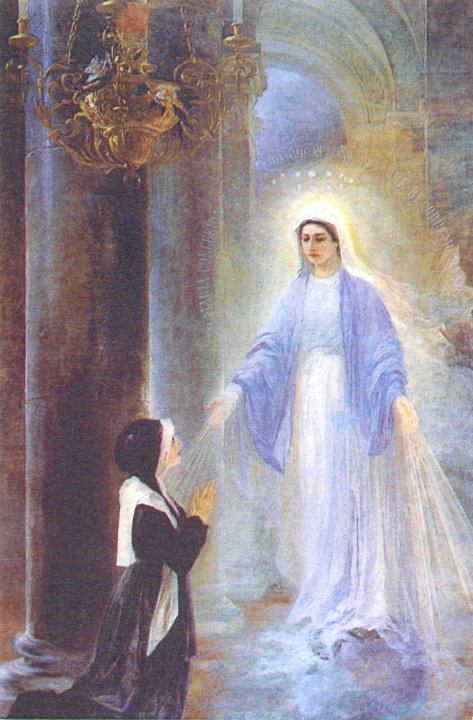
Apparition of the Virgin Mary (1909)

After the turn of the century, Driendl devoted himself almost entirely to architectural projects, including public works, such as the ferry terminals at Guanabara Bay, and private works for the politician, Custódio José de Melo, and the entrepreneur, Giuseppe Martinelli. He died in 1916 in Niterói.
