= Driendl =

Driendl is a surname. Notable people with the surname include:

- Andreas Driendl (born 1986), German ice hockey player
- Thomas Georg Driendl (1849–1916), German-born Brazilian painter, architect, and art restorer
