= Estêvão Silva =

Afro-Brazilian painter and art teacher

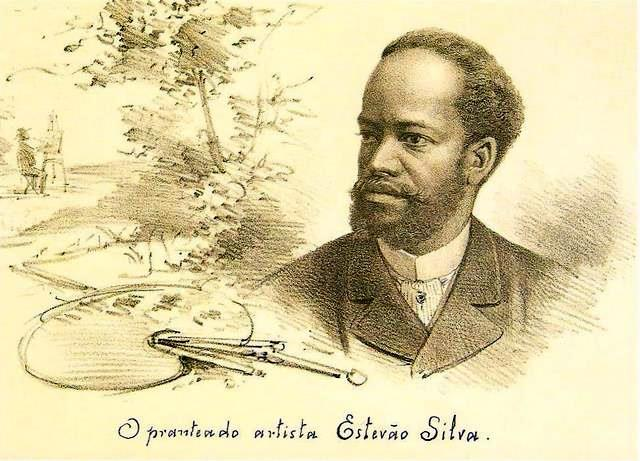
Estêvão Silva (1891) Museu Afro Brasil, São Paulo

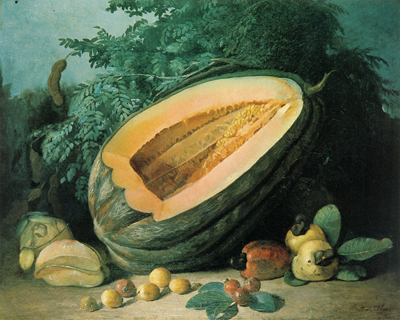
Still-life (date unknown)

Estêvão Roberto da Silva (1844? in Rio de Janeiro – 9 November 1891, in Rio de Janeiro) was an Afro-Brazilian painter and art teacher. He is the Patron of the 35th chair of the Brazilian Academy of Fine Arts.

== Life ==
His background is not known for certain, but his parents may have been slaves. He enrolled at the Academia Imperial de Belas Artes in 1864, where he studied with Victor Meirelles and Agostinho José da Mota, who inspired him to specialize in still-lifes. In the 1880s, he became identified with the "Grupo Grimm", an association of disaffected artists that formed around the German-born painter Georg Grimm, although he never actually broke with the Academy's teaching methods.

He was, however, involved in a protest concerning an award that he felt had been denied to him unjustly; a protest he made directly to Emperor Pedro II during the award ceremony. As a result, he came before a disciplinary committee that found him guilty of contempt for school discipline. Luckily, they also determined that he had no malicious intent, so he was suspended for one year rather than being expelled. Despite this incident, he became the first Afro-Brazilian to graduate from the Academy and became a teacher at the "Liceu de Artes e Ofícios do Rio de Janeiro", where he remained until his death.

In addition to his popular still lifes (mostly devoted to fruit), he painted some historical scenes and religious works.
