= Estevão Martins de Leomil =

13th century Portuguese nobleman

- Lord
- Born: 13th-century Kingdom of Portugal
- Died: 14th-century Kingdom of Portugal

Estevão Martins de Leomil (13th-century) was a Portuguese nobleman, Lord of Couto de Leomil (pt).

Estevão was the son of Martim Vicente, and grandson of Vicente Viegas, lord of Couto de Leomil and his wife Sancha. He was married to Urraca Rodrigues daughter of Rui Mendes da Fonseca and Teresa Anes de Leomil. Estevão Martins de Leomil is a direct descendant of Garcia Moniz, o Gasco.
