= O Primeiro Passo para a Independência da Bahia =

1931 painting by Antônio Parreiras

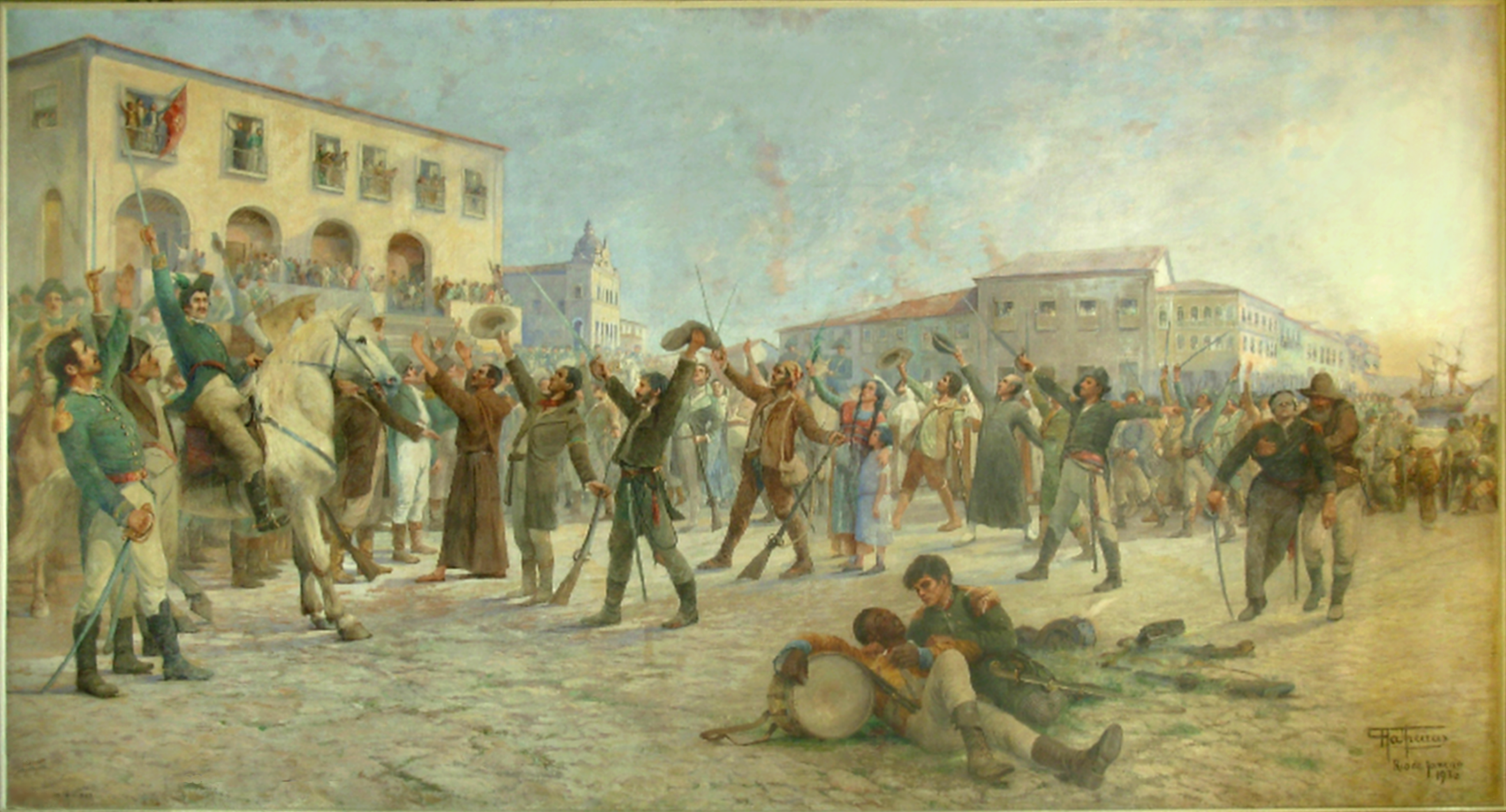
O Primeiro Passo para a Independência da Bahia, by Antônio Parreiras (1931)

The First Step towards the Independence of Bahia (Portuguese: O Primeiro Passo para a Independência da Bahia) is the title of two similar 1931 oil paintings by the Brazilian artist Antônio Parreiras, recalling the initial actions of the struggle for the Independence of Bahia, which took place in the then village of Cachoeira at the end of 1820.

== History ==
Hired on October 24, 1928, by the government of the State of Bahia, then represented by the Secretary of the Interior, Justice and Education, Prisco Paraizo, with Vital Soares as governor, Parreiras was supposed to record on screen the events that occurred on June 25, 1822, when the fighting effectively began in Bahia.

For the work, the painter would receive 50 contos de réis from the government, and was given historical material on which to base the allegory. The commission also specified that "...the scene will be painted on site and recreated with the utmost fidelity, and the characters who distinguished themselves in such a glorious moment will be portrayed when there is a portrait or documents that serve as guidance for this purpose."

Parreiras conceived the work to allow for the integration, on the same plane of the scene, of buildings that are arranged differently in reality. The most poignant scene in the painting, in the foreground in the lower right corner, depicts the agony of Tambor Soledade, an episode considered mythical, who is rescued by an officer.

The main painting, commissioned by the Bahia state government, is in the Rio Branco Palace; the other, smaller one, is in the Cachoeira City Council. The two paintings have slight differences, and some subsequent adjustments were made.

== Antônio Diogo da Silva Parreiras ==
Antônio Diogo da Silva Parreiras was a painter, designer, illustrator, writer and teacher who was born and died in the city of Niterói. His landscape paintings can be considered as representations of landscapes and moments, events considered sublime. Parreiras approached nature with the eyes of an artist, feeling it with the emotion that it causes in those who personally witness what he portrays. He had the desire to interpret nature when it still seemed to have been untouched.
