= Vicente Viegas, Lord of Couto de Leomil =

Portuguese nobleman

Vicente Viegas
- Lord
- Born: 13th century Iberian Peninsula
- Died: 13th century Iberian Peninsula

Vicente Viegas (born 13th century) was a Portuguese nobleman, Lord of Couto de Leomil (pt), in the Kingdom of Portugal.

His parents were Egas Garcia da Fonseca, 2nd Lord of Couto de Leomil and Maior Pais Romeu. His wife was Sancha.
