= José Pancetti =

Brazilian painter

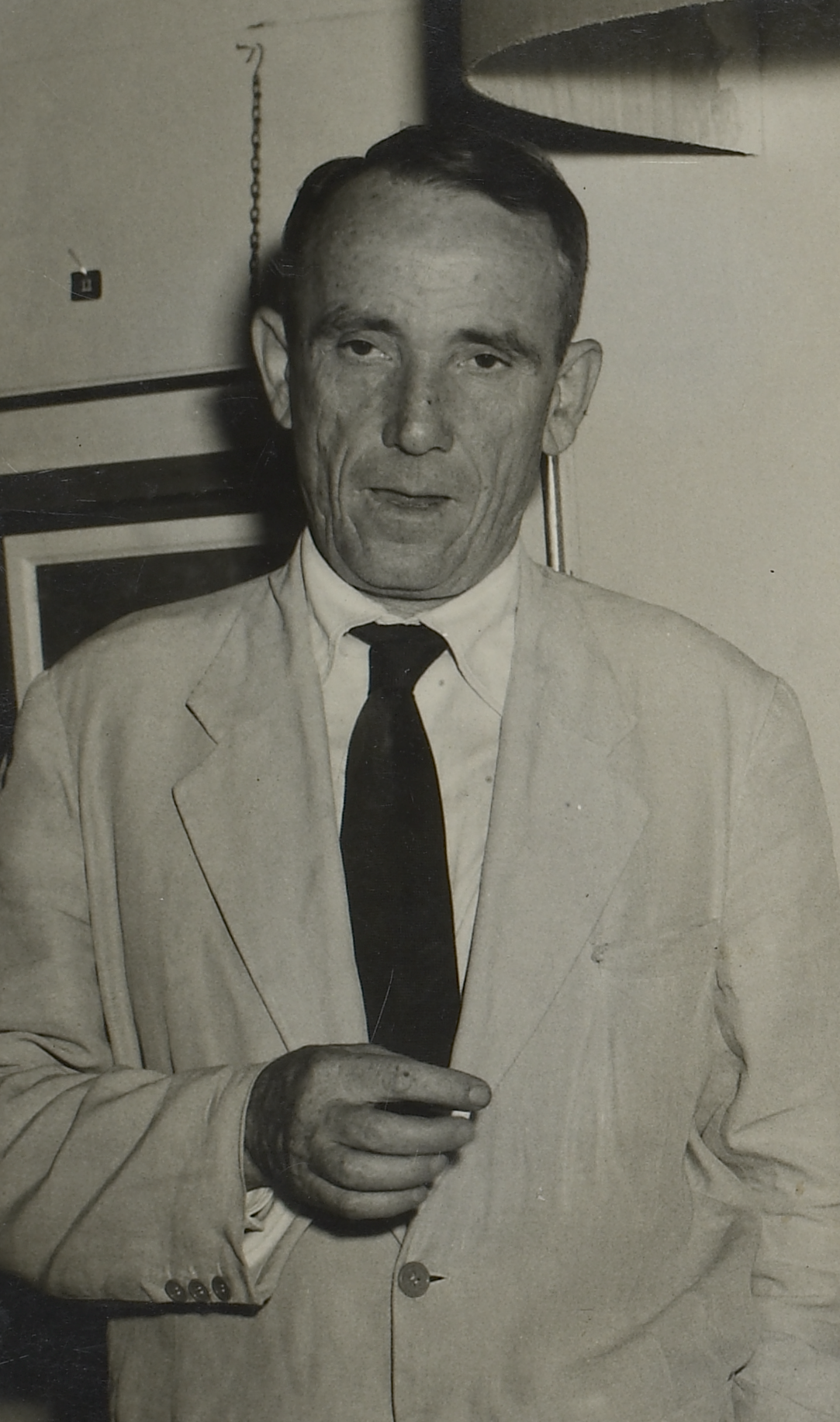
José Pancetti (1955)

Giuseppe "José" Pancetti (June 18, 1902 – February 10, 1958) was a Brazilian modernist painter.

== Biography ==
Born in Campinas into a family of immigrants from Tuscany, Italy, he lived in Campinas until he was 10 years old, when his father, a master carpenter, moved with his wife and children to the state capital, São Paulo, where he hoped to find better working conditions. One year later, José and one of his sisters moved to Italy, to live under the care of an uncle and grandparents.

== In Italy ==
Arriving at the house of his uncle Casimiro, he started to study at the Salesian College in Massa-Carrara. But shortly thereafter, Italy became involved in World War I and Pancetti had to be moved to the countryside home of his grandparents in the town of Pietrasanta.

There, he learned the craft of a carpenter in a small workshop. But he did not like the routine of the job and thus went to work, always briefly, in factories until the war ended.

Wishing to fix a better job for José, his uncle arranged for him to be a sailor in the Italian merchant navy, where he learned the seafaring profession. He boarded the "Maria Rosa" sailboat, which ran trips throughout the Mediterranean, especially between the ports of Genoa and Alexandria. But he later left the ship to go wandering the streets of Genoa, until someone took him to the Brazilian consulate, which provided for his return to Brazil.

== Back in Brazil ==
Thus, on February 12, 1920, he landed in Santos. To survive, he worked in different places and different crafts until, in 1921, he moved to São Paulo again, where a businessman, also of Italian origin, offered him a job as a painter of walls and posters, which was his first professional contact with painting.

In that same year, the painter Adolfo Fonzari offered to Pancetti an opportunity to assist him in decorating the house of another Italian in the coast of Guarujá.

Then, in 1922, Pancetti enlisted into the Brazilian Navy, where he was to remain for 24 years, until 1946.

== The discovery of painting ==
Aboard the Navy ships, Pancetti was given the task of painting hulls, walls, etc. He did this with such a zeal that his fame spread throughout the Navy until an admiral created a cadre of expert painters and appointed Pancetti as its first teacher of painting. But being a wall painter bored Pancetti; he thus swtiched to draw and paint postcards with landscapes, seascapes and romantic sceneries.

During the São Paulo Constitutional Revolution of 1932, Pancetti was on board of the cruiser "Rio Grande do Sul" from which he watched and painted a scene depicting a warplane being shot down by the machine guns of the cruiser. The painting was acquired and published by the weekly "Noite Ilustrada", which began his professional career in the fine arts.

In 1933, while walking through the Campo de Santana in Rio de Janeiro, he observed the painter Giuseppe Gargaglione in the process of capturing the city's landscape. Pancetti made conversation with him by asking about the painting and confessing his desire to learn to paint. Gargaglione advised Pancetti to seek Núcleo Bernardelli, a free painting school that operated in the building of the Rio de Janeiro School of Fine Arts. Pancetti accepted the suggestion and was admitted to the Núcleo, where his main advisor was painter Bruno Lechowski.

== At Núcleo Bernardelli ==
Two years later, in 1935, Pancetti married Anita Caruso, with whom he had two children.

His recognition as a painter began in 1933, with a participation at the Salão Nacional de Belas Artes (National Fine Arts Exhibition). He was invited again in 1934, 1936, 1939, 1940, 1941, 1947 and 1948. In 1941 he was awarded one of the prizes, which gave out an educational trip to Europe.

His first solo exhibition took place 10 years later, only, in 1945, featuring more than 70 of his paintings. His first international exhibition took place in 1950 at the Venice Biennale. The following year, he was accepted at the first International Art Biennial of Art São Paulo, having participated also in the third biennial (1955).

== Death ==
Pancetti suffered from tuberculosis. He spent some time in the spa cities of Campos do Jordão and São João del Rei, seeking a rest cure. He died in 1958 in the Naval Hospital of Rio de Janeiro and was laid to rest in the São João Batista cemetery in the quarter of Botafogo.

== Assessment ==
Pancetti specialized in painting mostly seascape ("marinhas", in Portuguese) and is notable for that, but he also liked to paint still life, landscape, figure and portrait painting. His work was recognized in the later part of his life. His production was not prolific, so his paintings are few and in the hands mostly of private collectors. After his death, his fame grew, and his paintings became more valued and command one of the best selling prices among Brazilian modernist painters. Indicative would be prices in 2017 of around USD 80,000 to about 250,000 for his seascapes whilst a portrait or a still-life might only attract from less than 10,000 to less than 50,000.

== Quote ==
"Certa vez, não sei como, tive vontade de pintar aquilo que meus olhos viram na louca carreira do mar...".
("Once upon a time, I don't know why, I had a wish to paint everything that my eyes saw in the weird movement of the sea ...")

== See also ==
- Brazilian painting
