= Egas Garcia da Fonseca =

Portuguese nobleman

- Lord
- Born: 12th-century Kingdom of Portugal
- Died: 12th-century Kingdom of Portugal
- wife: Maior Pais de Curveira

Egas Garcia da Fonseca, known as "Bufo", (12th-century) was a Portuguese nobleman, 2nd Lord of Couto de Leomil (pt).

== Biography ==
Egas was the son of Garcia Rodrigues da Fonseca and Dórida Gonçalves Viegas. His wife was Maior Pais de Curveira daughter of Paio Pires Romeu and Goda Soares.
