= Agostinho José da Mota =

Brazilian painter and teacher

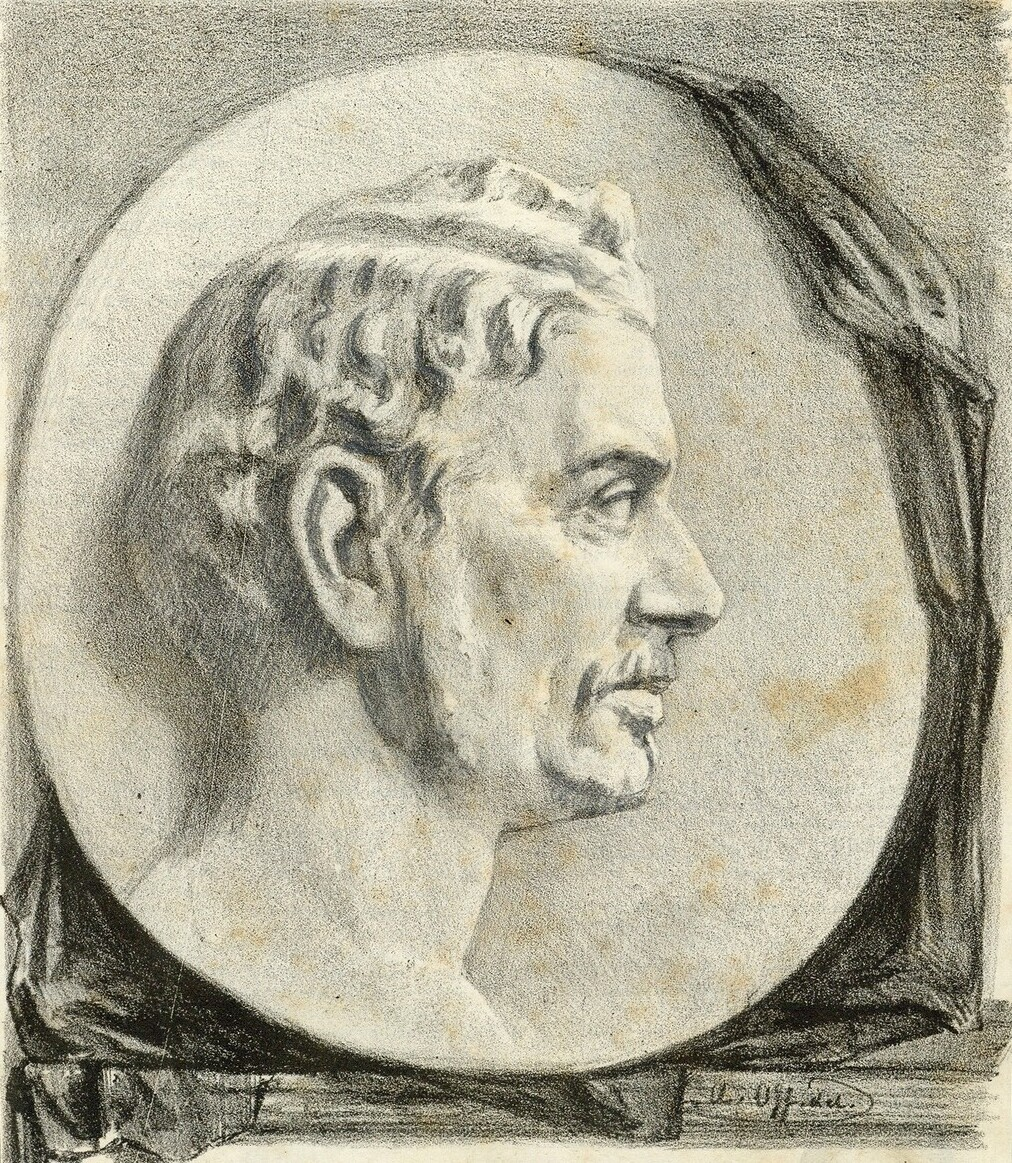
- Born: 18 June 1824; Rio de Janeiro, Brazil
- Died: 21 August 1878 (aged 54); Rio de Janeiro, Brazil
- Known for: Painting

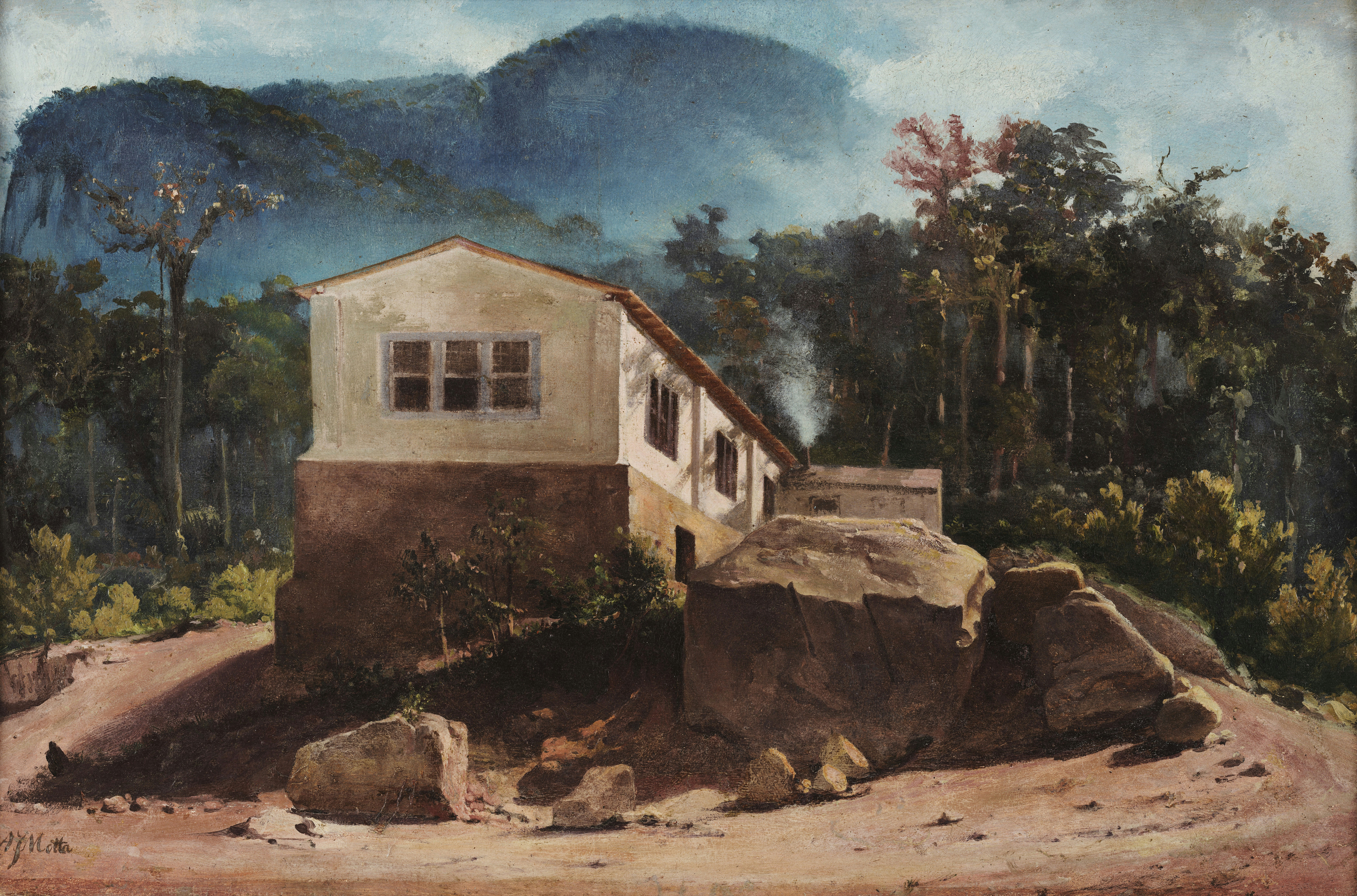
A fábrica do Barão de Capanema, 1862, Museu Nacional de Belas Artes

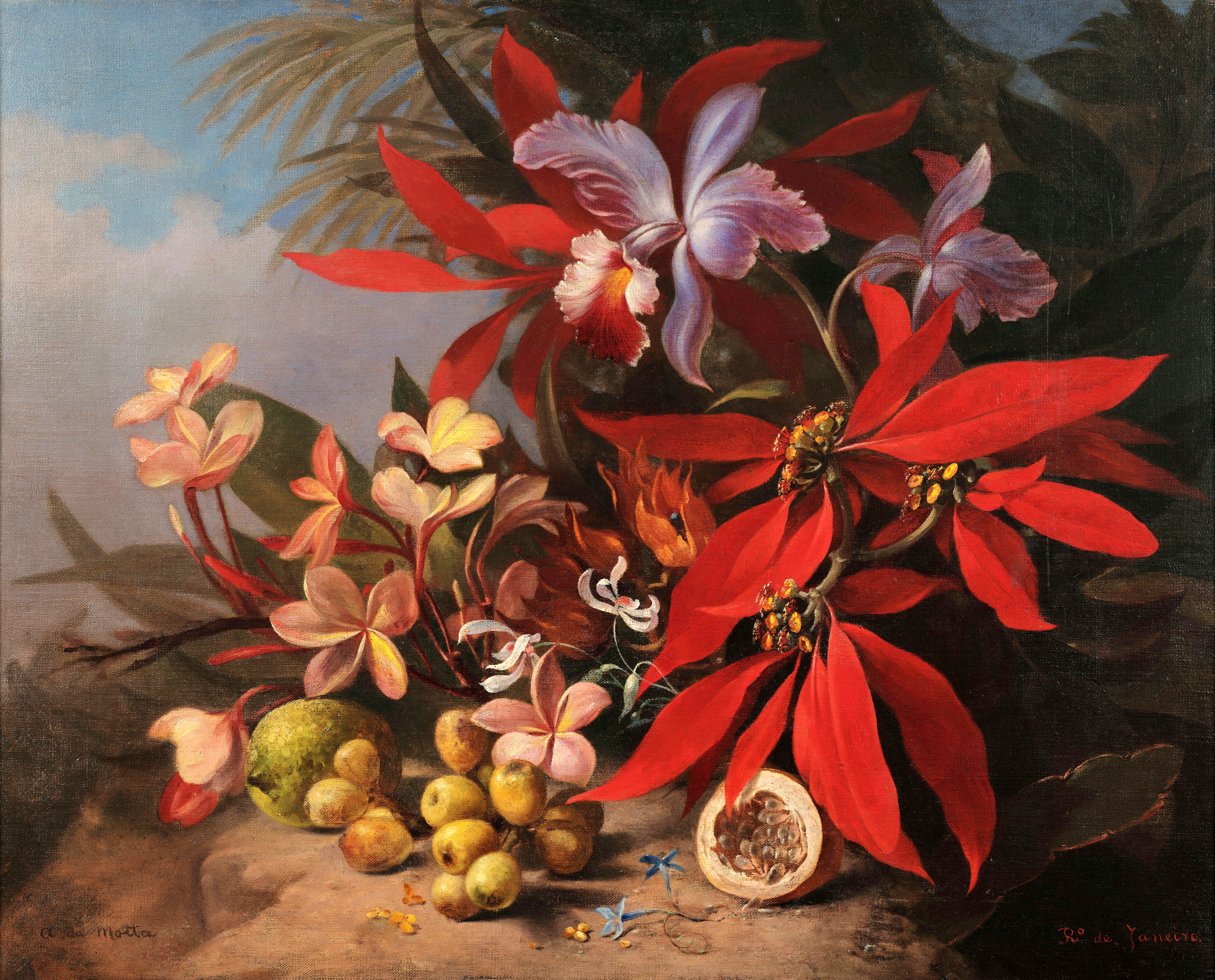
Flores, c. 1873

Agostinho José da Mota (18 June 1824 – 21 August 1878) was a Brazilian painter and teacher. He is the Patron of the 34th chair of the Brazilian Academy of Fine Arts.

== Biography ==
He was born in Rio de Janeiro. His inclination for art emerged early in childhood. In 1837 he enrolled in the Imperial Academy of Fine Arts. He was a brilliant student and received the prize of travel to Europe in 1850.

He lived in Rome from 1851 to 1855, and studied under the guidance of French landscape painter Jean-Achille Benouville.

Returning to Brazil in 1859 he began to teach at the Academy. Initially he occupied the chair of drawing and then of landscape. He contributed several times to the general exhibition of fine arts, receiving the gold medal in 1852, the Order of the Rose in 1868 and the Order of Christ in 1871.

Amongst his pupils, Modesto Brocos, Henrique Bernardelli, Pedro Peres, Firmino Monteiro and José Maria de Medeiros became well known.

The Empress Teresa Cristina commissioned several still lifes from him, a genre in which he excelled.

He was the pioneer of outdoor painting in Brazil, preceding Georg Grimm, who received the credit for this.

In later life he faced financial difficulties, having to paint advertising hoardings to survive. He died in 1878 in Rio de Janeiro.
