= Georg Grimm =

German painter

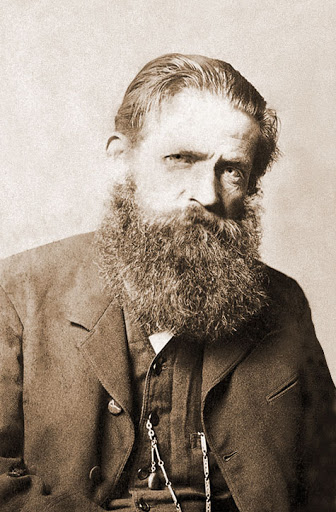
- Photograph taken shortly before his death
- Born: 22 April 1846; Immenstadt, Kingdom of Bavaria
- Died: 24 December 1887 (aged 41); Palermo, Kingdom of Italy
- Occupation: Painter
- Movement: Grupo Grimm

Johann Georg Grimm (1846–1887) was a German painter, designer and decorator who is best known for the work he produced during a lengthy stay in the Empire of Brazil. He is the Patron of the 19th chair of the Brazilian Academy of Fine Arts.

== Biography ==
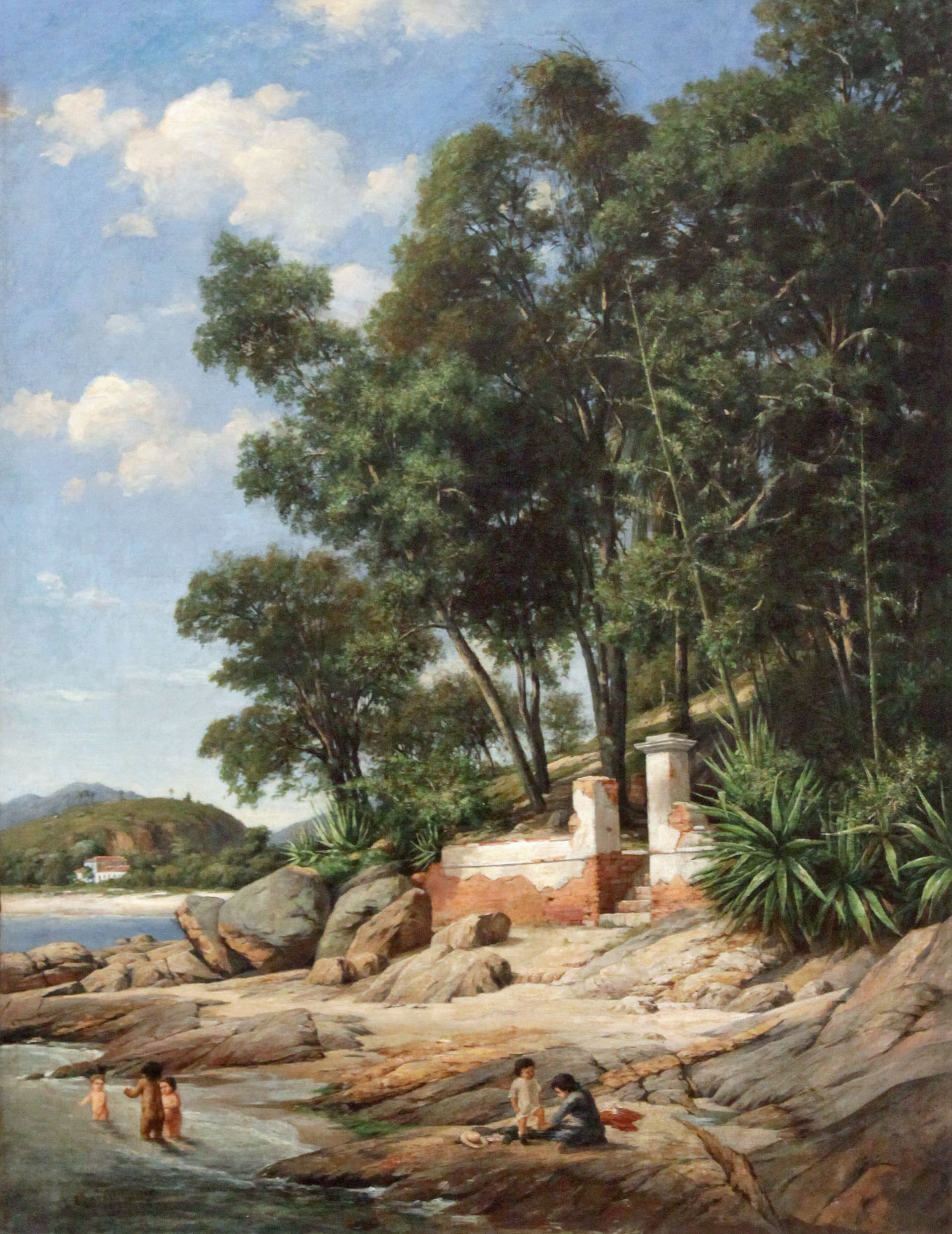
Cavalão Hill in Niterói (Gold Medal winner, 1884)

He was the son of a successful carpenter and was initially trained to follow his father into the trade. When they were hired to do some work in the library at Rauhenzell Castle, he found himself fascinated by the art books and decided that he wanted to become a painter, so he worked his way across Bavaria, finally arriving in Munich in 1868, where he had accumulated just enough money to study at the Academy of Fine Arts under Karl von Piloty and Franz Adam. Despite living in abject poverty, he completed his studies successfully. He briefly served in the Franco-Prussian War, where he met the painter Thomas Georg Driendl, who would later join him in Brazil and work with him on several projects.

In 1872, he went on foot to Berlin, where a benefactor helped him to study fresco painting. He left Berlin later that year and headed for Italy; again aided by his mysterious benefactor, believed to be the wife of a prominent surgeon. After extensive travels through Italy, North Africa via Sicily, Spain, France and England, he finally found himself in Lisbon and decided to go to Brazil, probably arriving in late 1877 or early 1878. He settled in Rio de Janeiro and soon teamed up with a fellow German immigrant who owned a painting and decorating company. His interest in landscapes began when he was hired by the owners of the nearby fazendas to paint topographical pictures of their properties, which he executed with photographic precision.

=== More travels and the Grupo Grimm ===
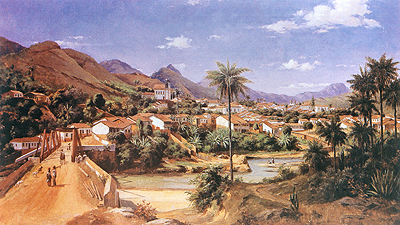
Panorama of Sabará (study for the curtains at the opera house, 1885)

He briefly returned to Germany from 1880 to 1881, following the death of his father, then took off travelling again; this time eastward, to Greece, Turkey, Palestine and Egypt. After a stay in Corsica, he returned to Brazil. Shortly after his arrival, he and his old friend Driendl were hired to create decorations at the Liceu Literário Português which was destroyed by fire in 1932. He then participated in an exhibition presented by the Sociedade Propagadora das Belas Artes, where he displayed the works he had painted after his earlier travels. He received the Gold Medal and much public praise, which resulted in his appointment to a vacant chair at the Imperial Academy of Fine Arts, obtained for him with the recommendation of Emperor Pedro II. One of the first things he did there was introduce the practice of plein-air painting.

Continuous disagreements with the Academy's leadership over his teaching methodology led to his resignation in 1884. Some of his students left with him and formed what came to be known as the "Grupo Grimm". It included many artists who would later become very well-known, such as Giovanni Battista Castagneto and Antônio Parreiras. The group had their first exhibition later that year at the Exposição Geral de Belas Artes, and several of them came away with Gold Medals.

Their association lasted only slightly more than a year, then broke up when Grimm was once again struck with wanderlust and moved to Minas Gerais, where he had worked during his first stay in the country. One of his initial projects there involved painting the curtains for the opera house in Sabará. This was followed by a tour of the coffee plantations, where he painted the life and work there as well as the architectural features he had depicted earlier.

During this time, he was diagnosed with tuberculosis. In June 1887, already ravaged by the disease, he called together his friends to say goodbye. He stayed for a short time with his brother in Wengen then, following his doctor's advice, went to Merano. Then, seeking a climate that was even more favorable, he went to Palermo. He died at the hospital there and was buried nearby.
