= Antônio Parreiras =

Brazilian painter and designer (1860–1937)

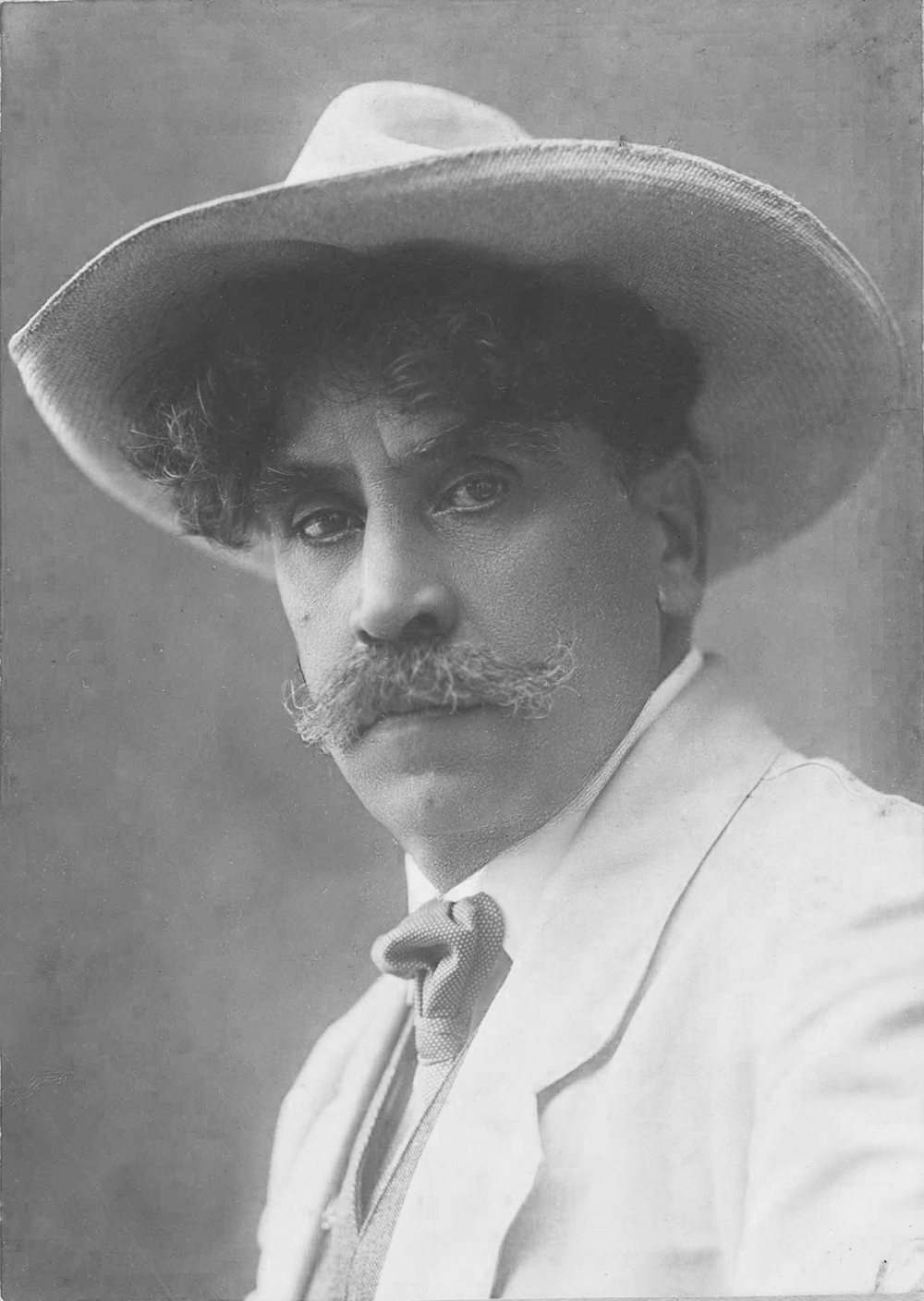
- Antônio Parreiras (date unknown, published 1920)
- Born: 20 January 1860; Niterói
- Died: 17 October 1937 (aged 77); Niterói
- Education: Escola Nacional de Belas Artes
- Notable work: O Primeiro Passo para a Independência da Bahia

Antônio Diogo da Silva Parreiras (20 January 1860 – 17 October 1937) was a Brazilian painter, designer, and illustrator. He is the Patron of the 8th chair of the Brazilian Academy of Fine Arts.

== Biography ==
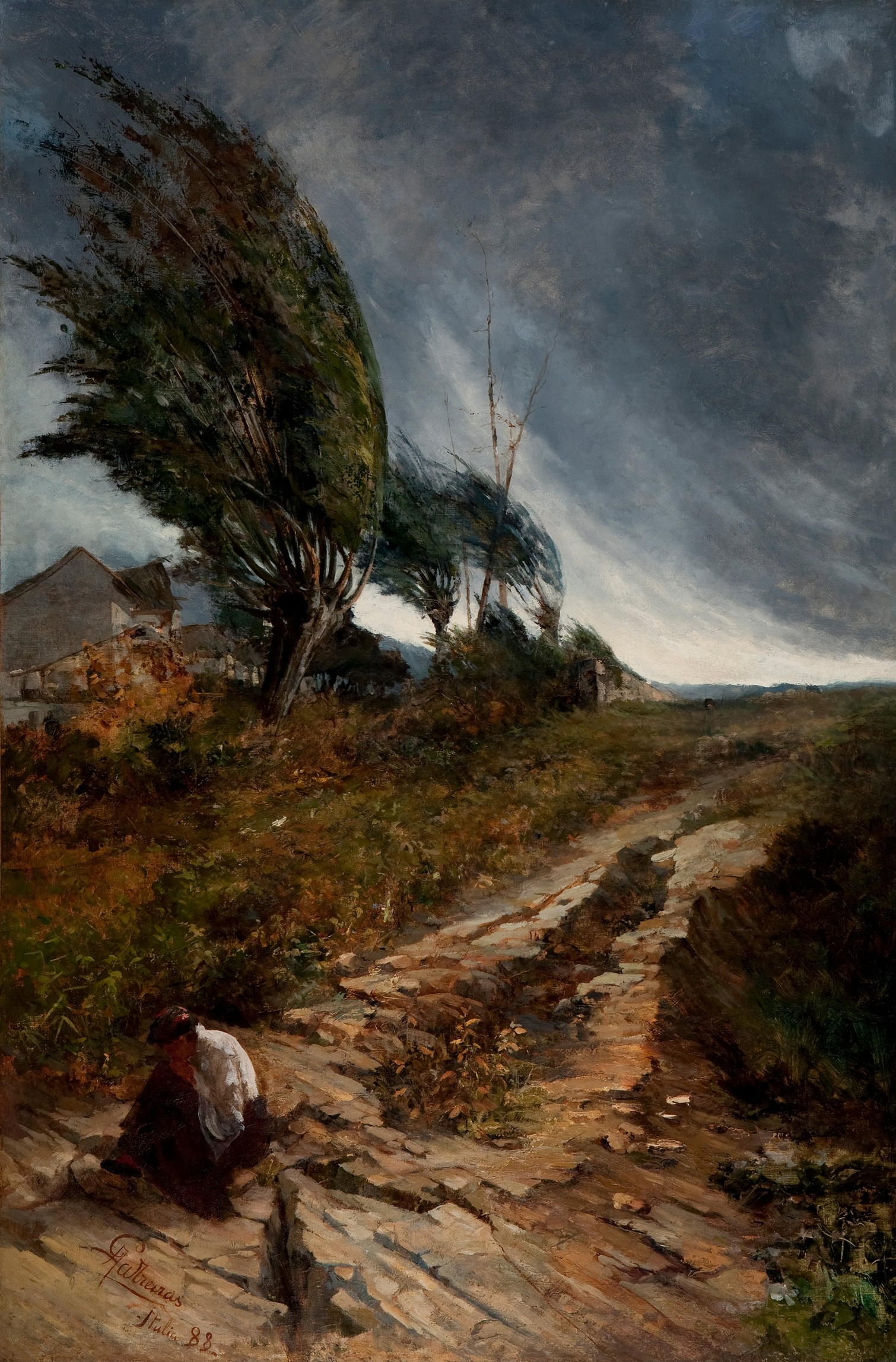
The Windstorm (1888), one of his most often reproduced paintings

He was one of nine children and his father was a goldsmith. In 1882, he enrolled at the Academia Imperial de Belas Artes in Rio de Janeiro, but left two years later to attend the free painting classes being offered by the German immigrant artist Georg Grimm. In 1885, when Grimm left to work in the countryside, Parreiras became an autodidact. A year later, one of his works was purchased by Emperor Pedro II.

This allowed him to resume his formal studies and travel to Europe in 1888, entering the Accademia di Belle Arti di Venezia where his teacher was Filippo Carcano. Upon his return to Brazil two years later, he participated in the "Exposição Gerais de Belas Artes". Later that same year, he became a Professor of landscape painting at the Escola Nacional de Belas Artes (ENBA) and, following the example set by Grimm, introduced his students to plein-air painting. Following disagreements with ENBA over changes in the curriculum, he set up his own school called the " Escola do Ar Livre".

He was soon doing much of his work in the forests outside Teresópolis. He also received numerous commissions to paint historical scenes and, after 1899, did decorations for the government in public buildings, such as the "Allegory of Apollo and the Goddesses of the Hours", which he created for the Palácio da Liberdade in Belo Horizonte. His female nudes are also considered to be especially well done. From 1906 to 1919, he maintained a second studio in Paris and exhibited at the Salon. He was also named a delegate of the Société Nationale des Beaux-Arts in 1911.

In 1925 he was chosen as Brazil's best artist by the readers of Fon-Fon, a magazine created by art critic Gonzaga Duque. The following year, he published his autobiography and was inducted into the "Academia Fluminense de Letras". In 1933, he participated in his last exhibitions; the "Jubileu Artístico" in São Paulo and Niteroi. Four years after his death, his former studio became the Museu Antônio Parreiras.

== Other selected paintings ==
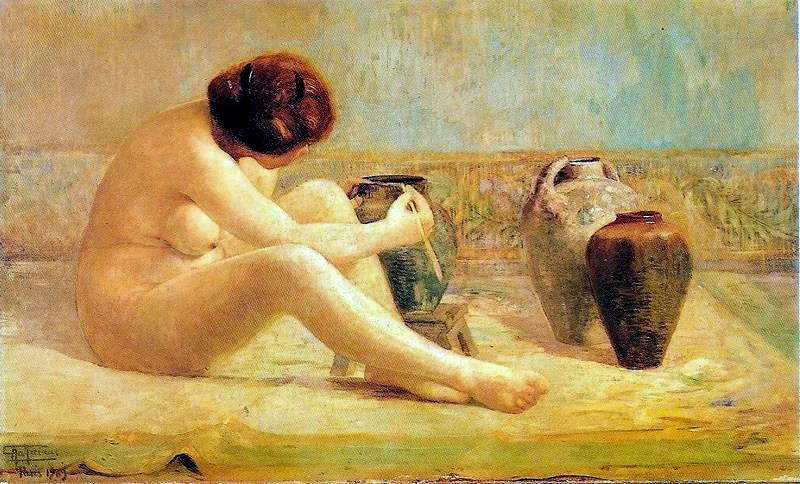
Fantasia (1909)

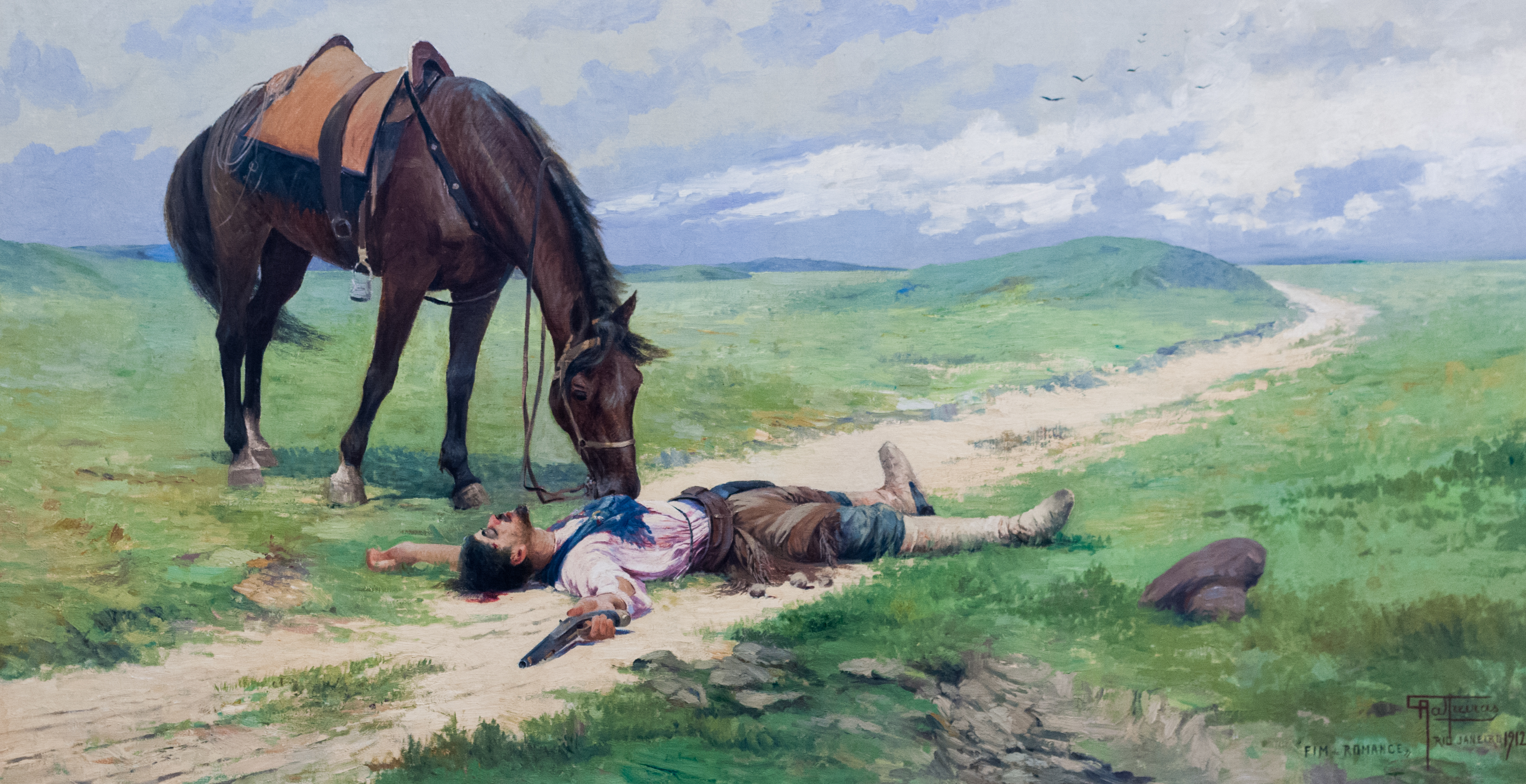
The End of Romance (1915)

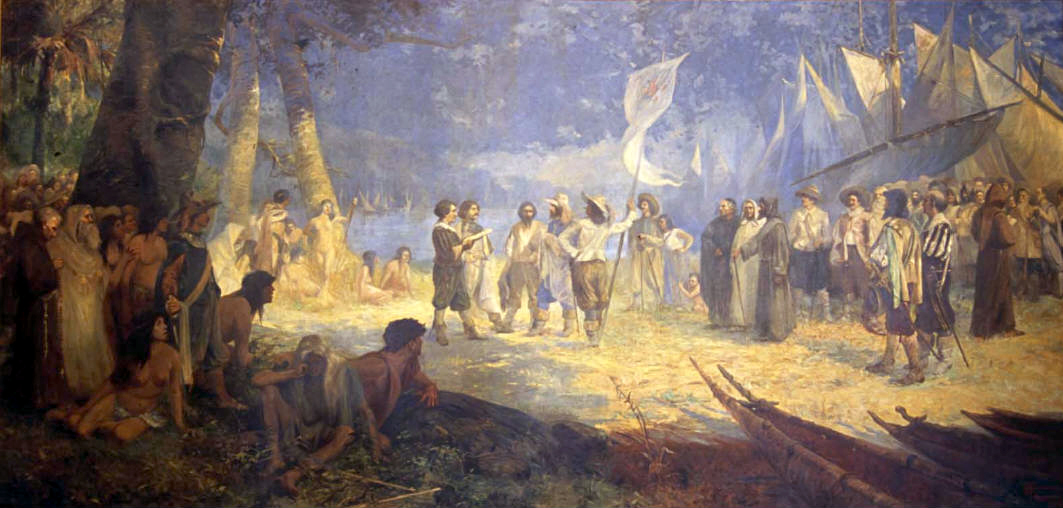
Conquest of the Amazon (1907)

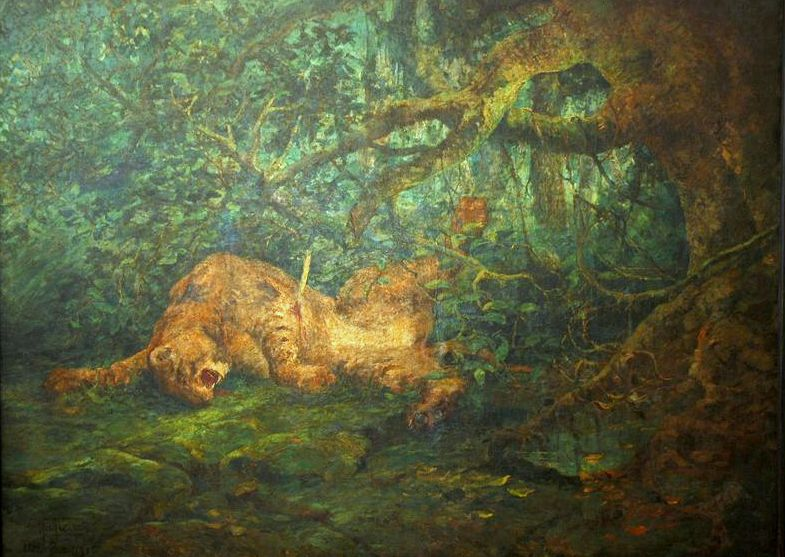
Agony (1915)

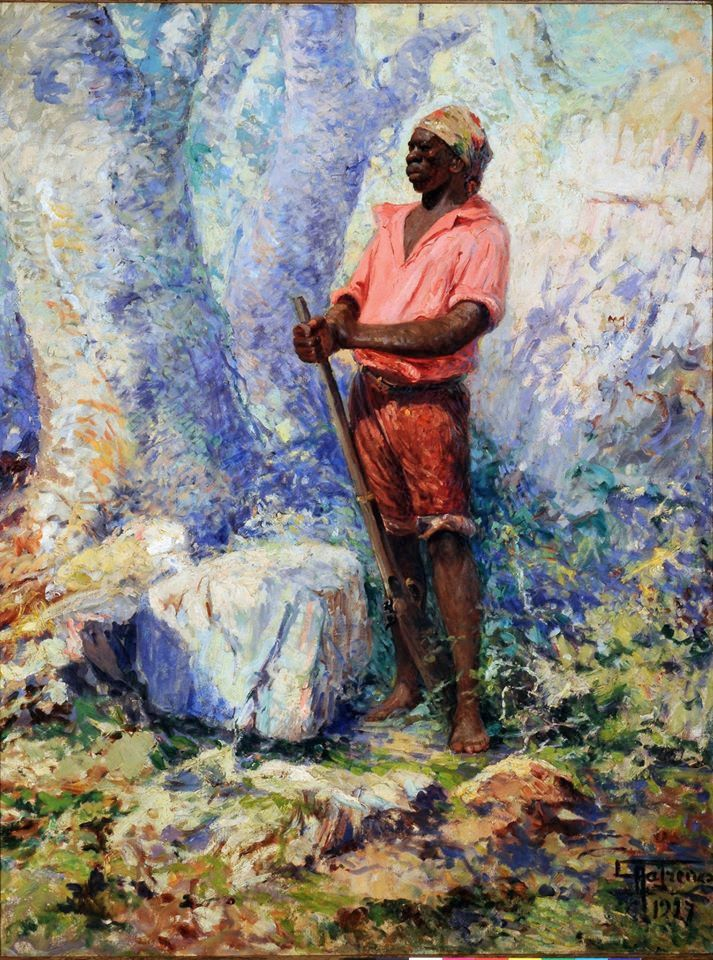
Zumbi (1927)

== See also ==
- Belém Museum of Art
