= Emerico Lobo de Mesquita =

José Joaquim Emerico Lobo de Mesquita
- Born: October 12, 1746; Serro, Brazil
- Died: April 1805; Rio de Janeiro, Brazil
- Occupations: composer, music teacher, conductor, organist

José Joaquim Emerico Lobo de Mesquita (12 October 1746 – April 1805) was a Brazilian composer, music teacher, conductor and organist.

== Life ==
Emerico was born at Vila do Príncipe (now Serro), in Minas Gerais State, Brazil. His parents, José Lobo de Mesquita and Joaquina Emerenciana, gave him a liberal education. He received his first music lessons (organ and music theory) from Father Manuel da Costa Dantas, who was an organist and choirmaster at the church Nossa Senhora da Conceição in Serro. Soon after 1776, he went to Arraial do Tijuco (now Diamantina) to become an organist and conductor at the cathedral Santo Antônio of Diamantina. On 17 January 1789, he entered the religious order Ordem Terceira de Nossa Senhora do Carmo. He founded a music school in this city and was appointed teacher of the art of music. In 1798, he worked in Vila Rica (now Ouro Preto) for the city mayor, and was also organist and choirmaster at the church Nossa Senhora do Pilar. He had a quarrel with the mayor and left for Rio de Janeiro, where he became organist of the Ordem Terceira do Carmo until his death, in April 1805.

Lobo de Mesquita was an important representative of the so-called Escola de Compositores da Capitania das Minas do Ouro (Composers' School of the Gold Mines Region). He was known for his virtuoso organ playing and art of improvisation.

== Compositions ==
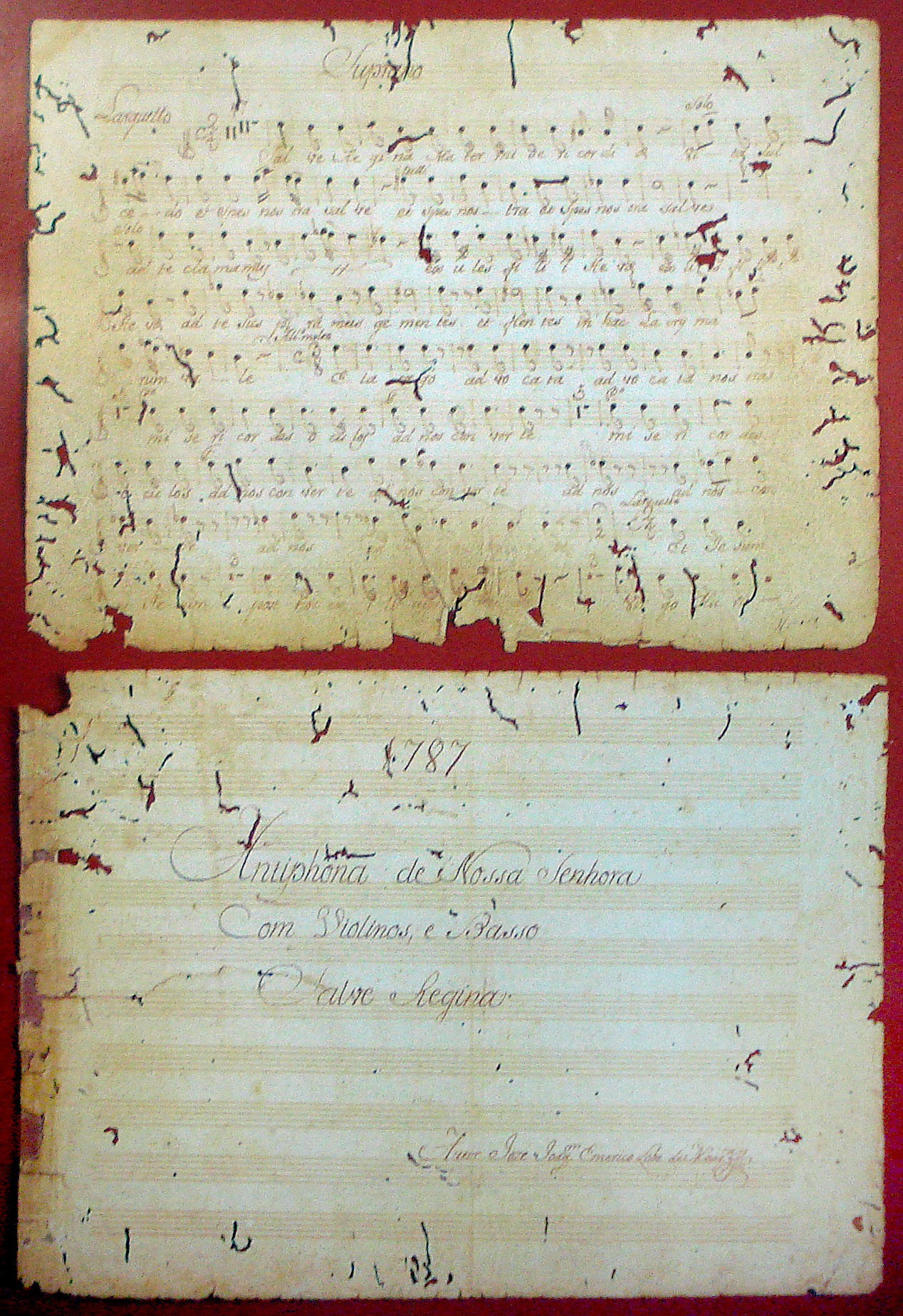
Salve Regina autographed manuscript

=== Sacred music ===
- 1778 Missa para Quarta-Feira de Cinzas, for soloists, mixed choir, cello and organ
- 1779 Regina caeli laetare
- 1780 Missa em fá nº 2, for 4 voices and strings
- 1782 Missa em mi bemol nº 1, for soloists, mixed choir and strings
  1. Kyrie eleison
  2. Christe eleison
  3. Et in terra pax
  4. Laudamus te
  5. Gratias
  6. Domine Deus
  7. Qui tollis
  8. Suscipe
  9. Qui sedes
  10. Quoniam
  11. Cum Sancto Spiritu
- 1782 Dominica in Palmis
- 1782 Ofício e Missa para Domingo de Ramos
- 1783 Tercio, for 4 voices and strings
- 1783 Tractus para o Sábado Santo
  1. Cantemus Domino
  2. Vinea facta est
  3. Attende cælum
  4. Sicut cervus
- 1783 Vésperas de Sábado Santo
- 1787 Antiphona de Nossa Senhora
- 1787 Salve Regina
- Antífonas para Quarta e Quinta-feira Santas
- Antífonas para Quarta, Quinta e Sexta-feira Santas
- Ária ao Pregador - Ave Regina
- Ave Regina coelorum
- Beata Mater
- Credo em dó, for 4 voices and strings
- Credo em fá
- Christus factus est e Ofertório
- Diffusa est gratia, concert for soloists, mixed choir and strings
- Domingo da Ressurreição
- Heu Domine, para a procissão do Enterro do Senhor
- Heus, para a Procissão do Enterro do Senhor
- In honorem Beatae Mariae (Ladainha)
- In pacem in idipsum
- Ladainha alternada
- Ladainha de Nossa Senhora do Carmo
- Ladainha do Senhor Bom Jesus de Matosinhos
- Laudate Dominum, para o Sábado de Aleluia
- Matinas de Natal
- Magnificat
- Magnificat alternado
- Memento a quatro, em sol menor
- Missa concertada e Credo
- Missa de Sábado Santo e Magnificat
- Missa de Santa Cecília
- Missa de Réquiem
- Novena das Mercês
- Novena de Nossa Senhora da Conceição
- Novena de Nossa Senhora do Rosário
- Novena de São Francisco de Assis
- Novena de São José
- Ofício das violetas
- Officium defunctorum
- Ofício e Missa de Defuntos
- Ofício de Semana Santa, for 4 voices and strings
- Ofício de defuntos ("Ofício das violetas"), for 4 voices and strings
- Ofício de defuntos nº 2, for soloists, mixed choir, cello and organ
- Paixão, Bradados e Adoração da Cruz, para Sexta-feira Santa
- Procissão de Ramos - Cum appropinquaret
- Responsório de Santo Antônio - Si quaeris miracula
- Salmo nº 112 - Laudate Pueri
- Setenário de Nossa Senhora das Dores
- Sequência Stabat Mater
- Te Deum, for 4 voices and strings
- Te Deum, em lá menor
- Te Deum em ré

=== Works for organ ===
- Difusa est Gratia Tércio
- Domine, tu mihi lavas pedes

== Bibliography ==
- Jozef Robijns, Miep Zijlstra: Algemene muziek enciclopedie, Haarlem: De Haan, (1979)-1984, ISBN 978-90-228-4930-9
- Vasco Mariz: História da Música no Brasil, 6ª edição ampliada e atualizada; Rio de Janeiro : Editora Nova Fronteira, 2005. 550 p., ISBN 85-209-1763-1
- Vasco Mariz: História da Música no Brasil, Rio de Janeiro: Editora Civilização Brasileira, 1994. ISBN 978-85-200-0193-6
- Vasco Mariz: História da Música no Brasil (Coleção Retratos do Brasil), Rio de Janeiro: Editora Civilizaçāo Brasileira, 1981. 331 p.,
- Miguel Fischer, Martha Furman Schleifer, John M. Furman: Latin American classical composers - A biographical dictionary, Lanham, Md: Scarecrow Press, Inc., 1996, 407 p., ISBN 978-0-8108-3185-8
- Hildred Roach: Black American music : past and present, 2nd Revised edition, Malabar, Florida: Krieger Publishing Company, 1992, 390 p., ISBN 978-0-89464-580-8
- Hildred Roach: Black American music. Past and present, Vol. II, Malabar, Florida: Robert E. Krieger, 1985, ISBN 978-0-89874-815-4
- Ary Vasconcelos: Raízes da música popular brasileira (1500-1889), São Paulo: Livraria Martins Editora, 1991, 324 p., ISBN 85-85297-11-5
- Ary Vasconcelos: Raízes da música popular brasileira (1500-1889), São Paulo: Livraria Martins Editora, 1977. 362 p.
- Heitor Geraldo Magella Combat: Um "Magnificat" de J.J. Emerico Lobo de Mesquita (1746-1805). Pesquisa sobre cópias encontradas em Cássia-M.G., em 1960, II. Encontro Nacional de Pesquisa em Música. Belo Horizonte 1986. S. 67-87.
- Marcos Antônio Marcondes: Enciclopédia da música brasileira: erudita, folclórica e popular, São Paulo: Art Editora, 1977
- Francisco Curt Lange: Os compositores na Capitania Geral das Minas Gerais, Marília, 1965, 111 p.
- Maria Luíza de Queiroz Amâncio dos Santos: Suplemento biográfico dos músicos que influíram em nossa cultura musical do XVI ao XIX século, in: Origem e evolução da música em Portugal e sua influência no Brasil, Comissão Brasileira dos Centenários de Portugal, 1942, 343 p.
