= Brazilian academic art =

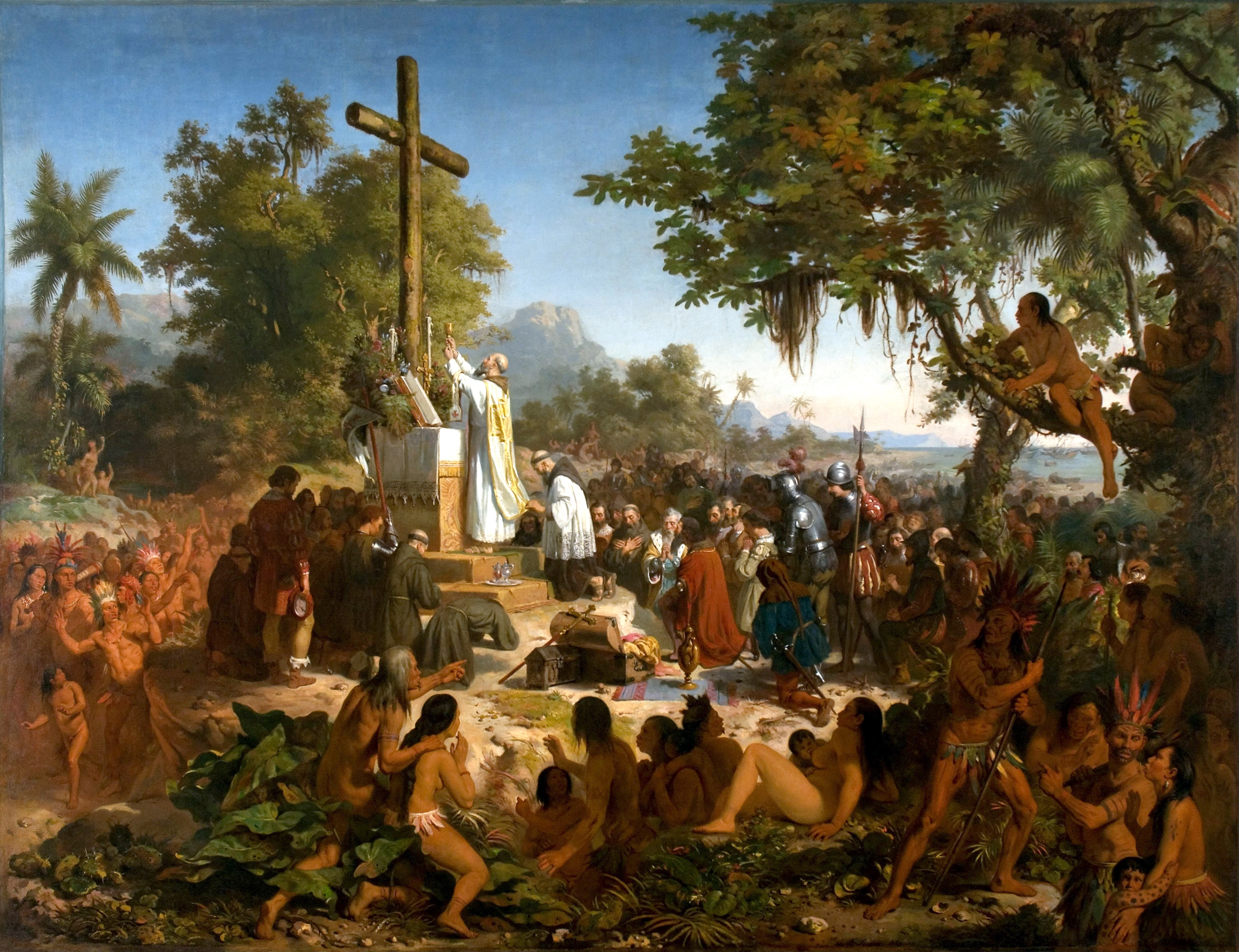
Victor Meirelles: The First Mass in Brazil, 1861, National Museum of Fine Arts

Brazilian academic art was the institutionalized expression of the entire art system that prevailed in Brazil from the early 19th century until the early 20th century, based on the principles of European art academies. It originated with the Royal School of Sciences, Arts and Crafts founded by John VI in 1816, encouraged by the French Artistic Mission, flourished under the Imperial Academy of Fine Arts and the patronage of Dom Pedro II, and concluded with the incorporation of its republican successor, the National School of Fine Arts, into the Federal University of Rio de Janeiro in 1931.

Academicism, in its strictest sense, refers to a structured artistic training program at the post-secondary level, comparable to contemporary university education. In Brazil, this system was introduced during the period of Neoclassicism, a style it significantly helped to disseminate, and later absorbed Romantic, Realist, Symbolist, and other aesthetics that characterized the turn of the 19th to the 20th century, while filtering out elements that did not align with the Academy’s formality.

The close connection between Brazilian academic art and the established power broadened the term’s meaning, making national Academicism not only a teaching system but also a philosophical movement and a political act. It served as a laboratory for formulating significant symbols of national identity and a platform for their dissemination, contributing to making its period of influence one of the richest, most complex, and dynamic in the history of Brazilian art. Its substantial legacy in art remains significant to this day. Although the term Academicism is most commonly applied in Brazilian Art History to the period outlined above, the academic teaching system survived the challenges of Modernism and 20th-century avant-garde movements, albeit transformed, integrating into the environment of modern university art schools, which today produce and theorize art at a high level and are direct descendants of the School founded by John VI and the French.

== The European academic model and the Brazilian context ==
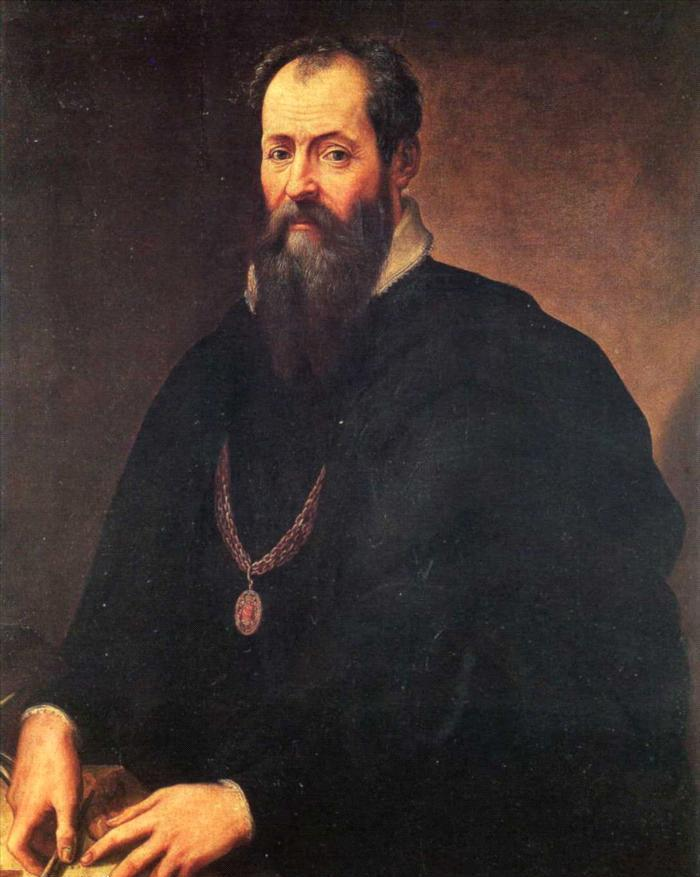
Giorgio Vasari: Self-portrait

Art academies emerged in the late Renaissance. Previously, artistic production occurred through artisan guilds and collective workshops, known as guilds, which often functioned as professional associations where learning was essentially informal. There were no regular classes or a systematized methodology. Seeking to organize this system and elevate the status of art from a skilled craft to a liberal profession, the Accademia del Disegno was founded in Florence in 1563, under the encouragement of Vasari and the patronage of Cosimo de’ Medici. Initially offering only theoretical lectures and anatomy classes, and in practice not differing greatly from other guilds, the Accademia del Disegno soon became a respected educational institution, responsible for training painters, sculptors, and architects, and serving as a governmental advisory body for all matters related to the city’s public works. In 1593, the Accademia di San Luca was established in Rome with a more structured organization and a consistent class schedule. Over time, the academic education system became highly standardized, based on practical and theoretical principles, including observational drawing, copying established models, geometry, anatomy, and perspective, as well as history and philosophy. Adopting the idea that art could be taught comprehensively and that talent alone was insufficient without disciplined and methodical training, the notion of individual originality was problematized, but art was distinguished from craft by placing the artist in a higher intellectual and professional sphere. For academics, the starting point was tradition, believing that adopting the same theoretical and technical principles observed in the works of established masters would enable achieving the same level of quality.

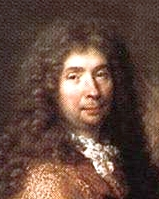
Charles Le Brun

Following the Italian example, in 1648, the Royal Academy of Painting and Sculpture was founded in Paris with the same goal of teaching art as a liberal profession. With financial support from the government of Louis XIV and under the direction of Le Brun, the French Academy developed a robust aesthetic orthodoxy and a philosophy aligned with the state’s propagandistic policies, controlling nearly all art produced in France and exerting significant influence throughout Europe, particularly during Neoclassicism. From this source, Brazilian Academicism emerged. Thus, "Academicism" is not so much a specific style, as academics existed since the 16th century, spanning successive styles—Renaissance, Mannerism, Baroque, Neoclassicism, etc.—but rather a teaching system guided by traditional and formalized pedagogical and aesthetic criteria. The term academic artist strictly refers to someone who entered and was trained in any of the art academies.

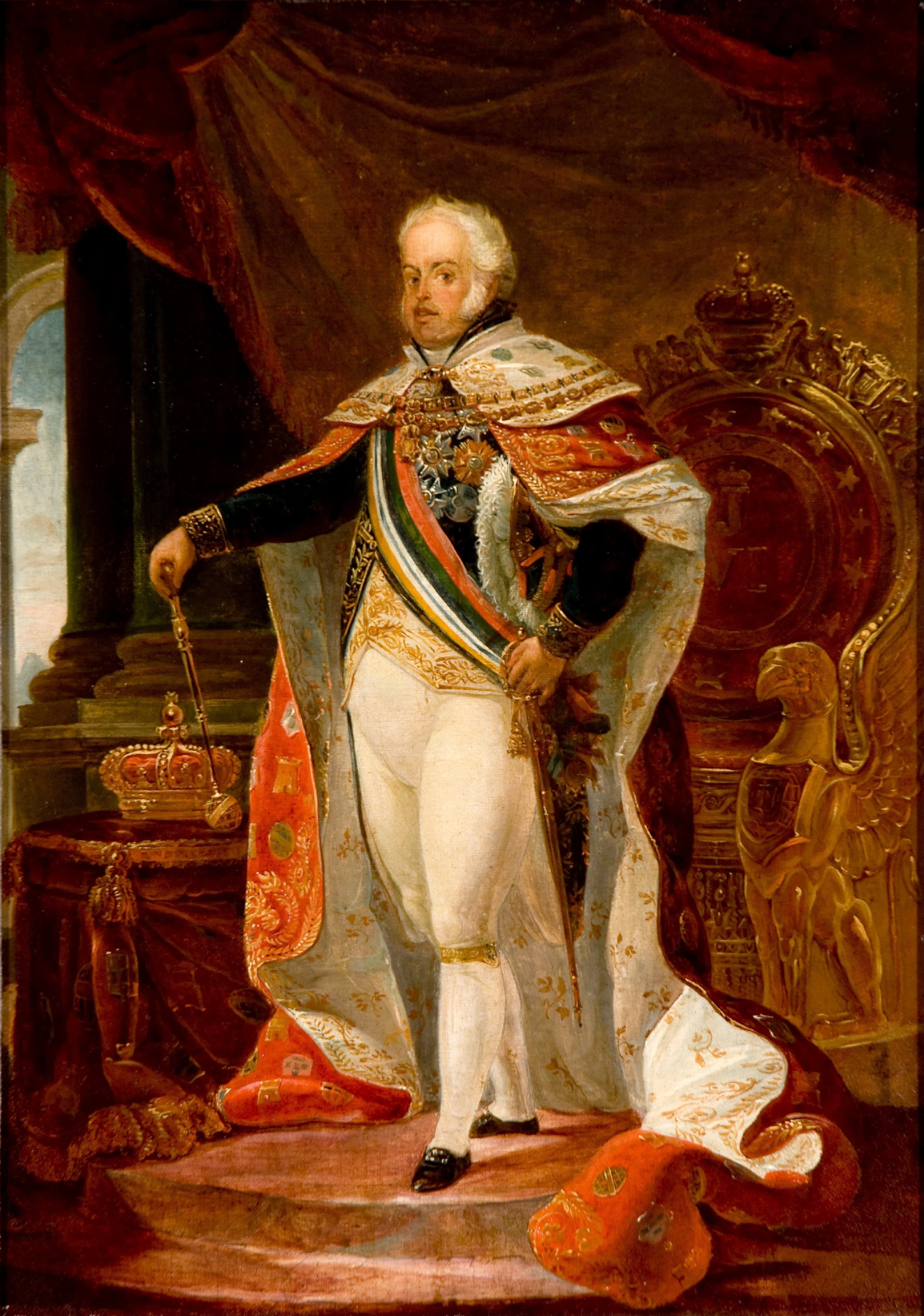
Debret: John VI of Portugal, 1816, MNBA

Until the early 19th century, art education in Brazil was largely informal, occurring in artists’ workshops with their disciples, much like European guilds. The state subsidized only a modest school, the Royal School of Drawing and Figure, founded in 1800 in Rio de Janeiro and directed by Manuel Dias de Oliveira. The transfer of the Portuguese court to Brazil in 1808 brought profound cultural, social, and institutional changes to the country, then a colony with an extractive and agrarian economy. Institutions, public services, and general administration were reorganized, and there was a need to align Brazil with the more advanced cultural currents developing in Europe at the time. Simultaneously, there was a severe shortage of trained professionals to meet the growing demands for artisans and masters in various technical specialties, such as architecture, urban planning, and engineering, which, in the tradition of the time, overlapped and were often taught in art courses, valuable for the industrialization and modernization of the colony, soon elevated to the status of United Kingdom with Portugal. Thus, the establishment of an art academy in Brazil addressed various practical and cultural needs.

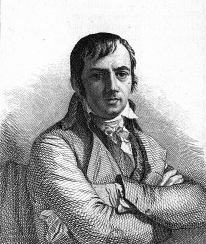
Joachim Lebreton

In this rapidly transforming scenario, the French Artistic Mission arrived in 1816, proposing the creation of an art school inspired by the respected French Academy model. Its project involved establishing graduate courses for training both future artists and technicians in auxiliary activities such as modeling, interior design, carpentry, and others. Joachim Lebreton, the Mission’s leader and project idealizer, systematized the process, evaluation and approval criteria, class schedule, and curriculum, suggested ways to utilize graduates publicly, and planned the expansion of official collections with their works, also specifying the human and material resources needed for the School’s proper functioning. Pragmatically recognizing that great art would persist even in a world transformed by the French Revolution, merely shifting from monarchies to the wealthy bourgeoisie, Lebreton proposed a project rooted in a significantly ancient tradition but eminently practical and proven effective over time, unprecedented in Brazil and even in Portugal. Immediately embraced by John VI, this proposal led to the founding of the Royal School of Sciences, Arts and Crafts. This created the initial conditions for the emergence of a new art system in Brazil, inextricably linked to the academy’s operation as an institution. However, in its early years, the School faced serious difficulties and took at least ten years to become established and fully operational, leading to its reopening on November 5, 1826, in the presence of Emperor Dom Pedro I, as the Imperial Academy of Fine Arts.

=== Beginnings: Lebreton’s Academy ===
Academicism represented a revolution in Brazilian art teaching methods, constituting the vanguard of its time. Afonso Taunay summarized its significance by stating that "to the empiricism or automatism of the current artistic and professional learning processes, it substituted a methodology. The anti-didactic era ended, and the didactic era began.... In painting—the ancient, mythology, and history replaced the almost exclusively sacred work of the colonial and late viceregal ‘saint-makers’". Regarding the method, teaching would develop in the following stages:

- General drawing and copying models from masters, for all students;
- Drawing of figures and nature, and elements of modeling for sculptors;
- Academic painting with live models for painters; sculpture with live models for sculptors, and study in the ateliers of master engravers and designers for students of these specialties.

The same three-stage structure, divided into theoretical and practical parts, would be used for architecture:

- In theory:
  - History of architecture through the study of ancient works;
  - Construction and perspective;
  - Stereotomy.
- In practice:
  - Drawing;
  - Copying models and studying dimensions;
  - Composition.

At the same time, Lebreton envisioned the education of auxiliary artisans with the introduction of technical courses. His plan was extensively detailed, but it is known that its guidelines were not fully implemented in the initial establishment of the Imperial Academy. Lebreton soon died and was succeeded by Henrique da Silva, a staunch opponent of the French, who eliminated technical courses, leading Debret to lament the direction things were taking, causing "the Academy’s teaching to succumb to the errors and vices of the Ancien Régime".

=== Stability ===
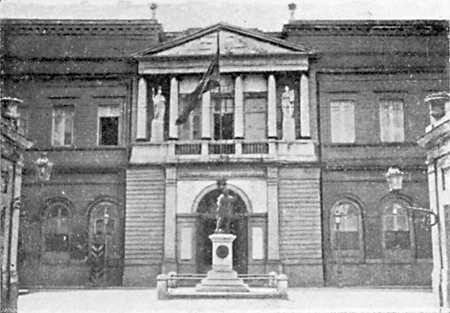
The Imperial Academy building, designed by Grandjean de Montigny

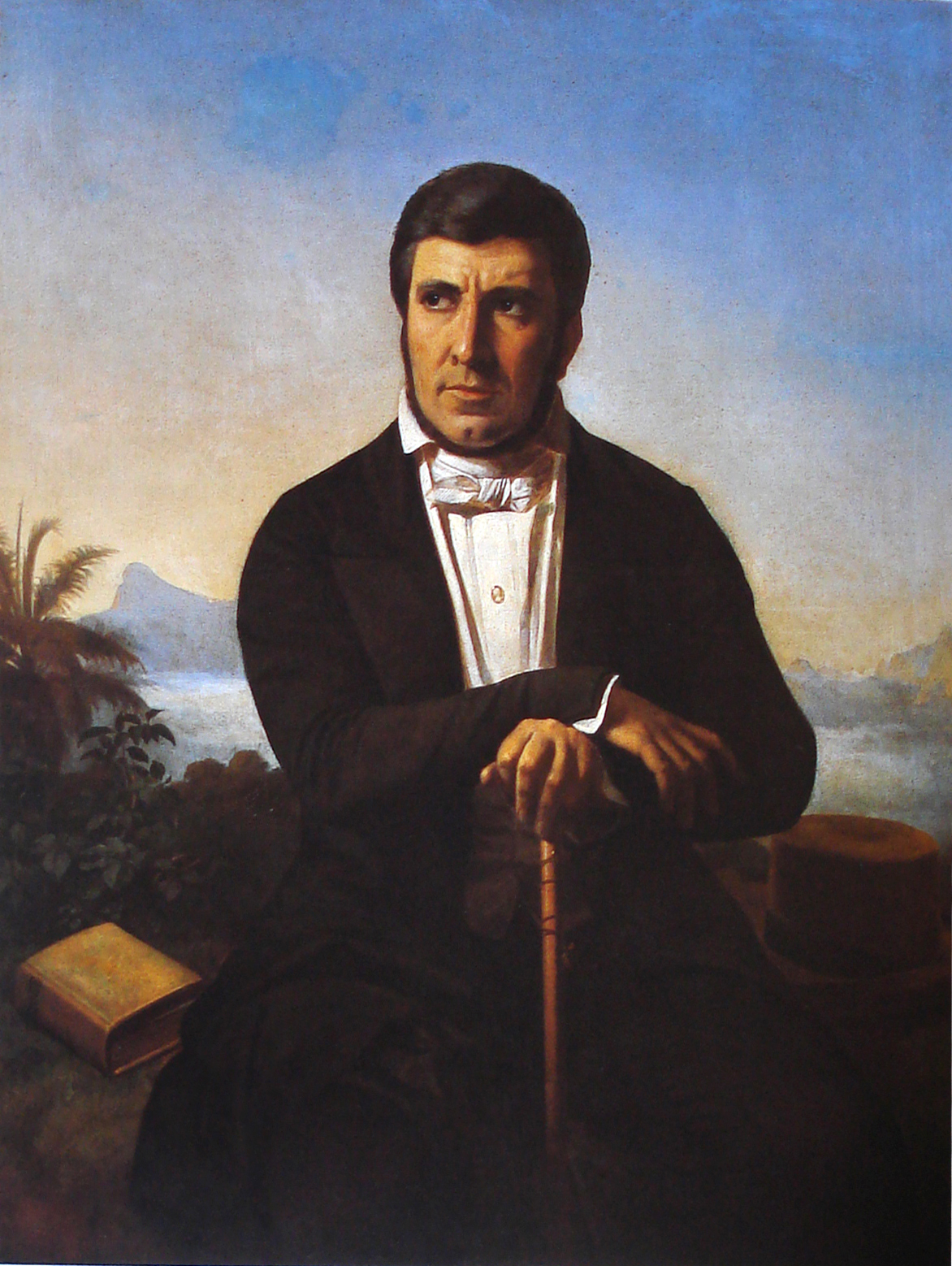
Ferdinand Krumholz: Portrait of Manuel de Araújo Porto-Alegre, 1848, MNBA

The study of Academicism in Brazil is tied to the history of the Imperial Academy, the central hub for disseminating the new teaching and art production system that became dominant throughout Brazil, serving as a model for similar courses elsewhere. Lebreton’s formula was comprehensive but could never be fully implemented. The Lino Coutinho Reform of 1831 essentially reaffirmed the school’s dual role as a center for training artists and artisans, as envisioned by the Frenchman, after a partially operational start. This reform guided the management of Félix Taunay, son of Nicolas, who had returned to France disillusioned with the delays and intrigues surrounding the project. Félix organized the Academy’s library, translated foreign theoretical reference sources, established improvement awards through scholarships, and organized the General Exhibitions, though he also did not support technical courses.

With the political and social stability of the Second Reign, and with the constant support of the new emperor D. Pedro II, the Imperial Academy began a cycle of prosperity, but it was never a peaceful place and always suffered from various infrastructure deficiencies. There were repeated complaints about the low general education level of students and their allegedly weak and scarce production, and the administrative and aesthetic-pedagogical disputes, both internal and external, are now well documented, as expected for a proposal aimed at founding an entirely new art system and suppressing deeply rooted older practices. Despite setbacks and achievements, the Imperial Academy was the center of attention, prospered, and became increasingly prominent in the Rio de Janeiro and, by extension, Brazilian art scene, as it played a decisive role in directing the course of national art. Over the years, the institution grew and sought to refine its practices, restructuring or improving the curriculum several times and establishing travel awards with scholarships for studying abroad. In the second half of the century, the academic system reached its peak, with the administrative structure and teaching of the Imperial Academy stabilizing, a succession of notable students and masters attending classes, and the art scene benefiting from the growing and dynamic participation of foreign artists, many of whom came with complete training from European academies and contributed by teaching, such as François-René Moreaux and Georg Grimm, or were trained at the Imperial Academy itself and later became notable figures, such as Augusto Müller and Giovanni Battista Castagneto.

By this time, a series of new criticisms demanded an update of the school. Manuel de Araújo Porto-Alegre assumed directorship in 1854, proposing a new reform in the curriculum and teaching methods, known as the Pedreira Reform. His inaugural speech demonstrates his awareness of Brazil’s cultural and infrastructural limitations and his attempt to restructure the art production system by solidifying its foundation:

"I come not with unfounded desires nor with the vanity of showcasing public exhibitions in a young country where wealth and aristocracy have not yet called upon the fine arts to adorn their coats of arms and their generosity. We all know that art exhibitions only shine in countries where statues and original paintings are purchased, and where architects continuously plan buildings that are constructed in public squares. Everyone knows that only Their Majesties buy art objects at exhibitions... Our mission will be of a more modest but more useful and necessary order for the present: ... before the artist, the good artisan must be prepared, just as before the artisan, the necessary craftsman must already exist".

At the same time, he had ambitious goals for the training of artists. In a solemn session in September 1855, he proposed the "30 artistic points to be developed by the members of the Academy", many of a philosophical rather than merely administrative nature, indicating that the system as a whole was well-established and capable of self-reflection. Araújo was dynamic, held modern ideas, and revived Lebreton’s neglected principles, such as the focus on technical courses, creating new courses—geometric drawing, industrial drawing, theory of shadows and perspective, applied mathematics, ornamental sculpture, and history and theory of the arts. He defended teachers in various disputes, expanded the Academy’s building to accommodate the Art Gallery, emphasized the importance of artists’ general education and their contribution to forming a progressive nation, and secured an extension in the duration of scholarships. He also tirelessly advocated for the development of a formal vocabulary that reflected the reality and distinctive characteristics of Brazilian nature and people, rather than a mere transposition of programmed European solutions. His program and criticisms of fellow teachers sparked strong opposition in conservative sectors, making his tenure brief—he resigned in 1857—but his innovations guided the Imperial Academy’s operations until the Republic. He was later praised even by Gonzaga Duque, a well-known critic of the Academy.

== Artistic education ==
The academic system relied on rigorous technical-formal principles for creating and judging a work, requiring deep knowledge of anatomy, perspective, and specific techniques for each artistic discipline. These were systematically taught and periodically tested through juried evaluations with test pieces, works created specifically to demonstrate the student’s progress. The process took several years to complete, much like the modern academic system in the sense of a university, training professionals at a higher education level. According to Cybele Fernandes,

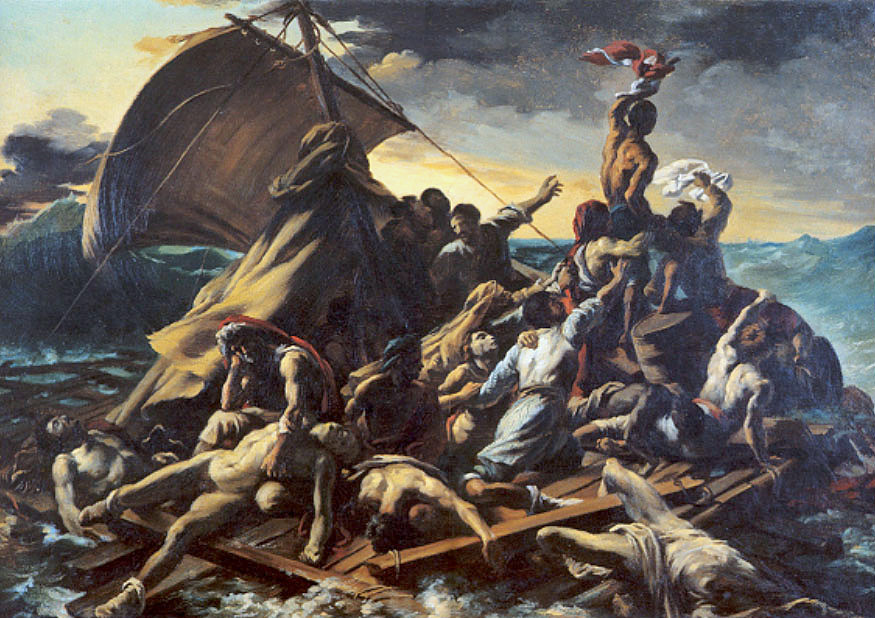
Théodore Géricault: The Raft of the Medusa, copy made by Victor Meirelles as a student in Europe, Victor Meirelles Museum

"The neoclassical tradition endorsed the analytical method, with the teacher as an attentive observer and guide. Without neglecting the student’s creative freedom, the master was to guide them in valuing the need for rules, ideal beauty, grace, compositional harmony, and good taste. In this sense, knowledge of sacred history, classical mythology, and symbols was essential for creating allegorical compositions and for the student’s general education."

The theoretical framework guiding academic education owed much to the notion of interdependence among the arts and with the humanities, where literature and rhetoric played a significant role. In the French model, part of the teaching involved using a work as the subject of a lecture, with a preceptor discussing its technical qualities and flaws, stylistic lineage, and meanings and references within the broader cultural universe. For example, many painting treatises were based on works about rhetoric, as this art sought to capture the audience’s attention and persuade them of the advocated viewpoint. A good orator used a range of figures of speech, effective gestures, carefully chosen facial expressions, and sometimes even relied on their attire, employing all resources to create a mental visualization for the audience with a theatrical dramatization character. Much of this verbal and performative repertoire was directly transposed to the visual arts, giving rise to a standardized iconography that became the basic elements of visual language, just as words are to spoken discourse, easily understood by all and automatically conveying a conventional pre-established meaning for each character painted or sculpted in a certain way.

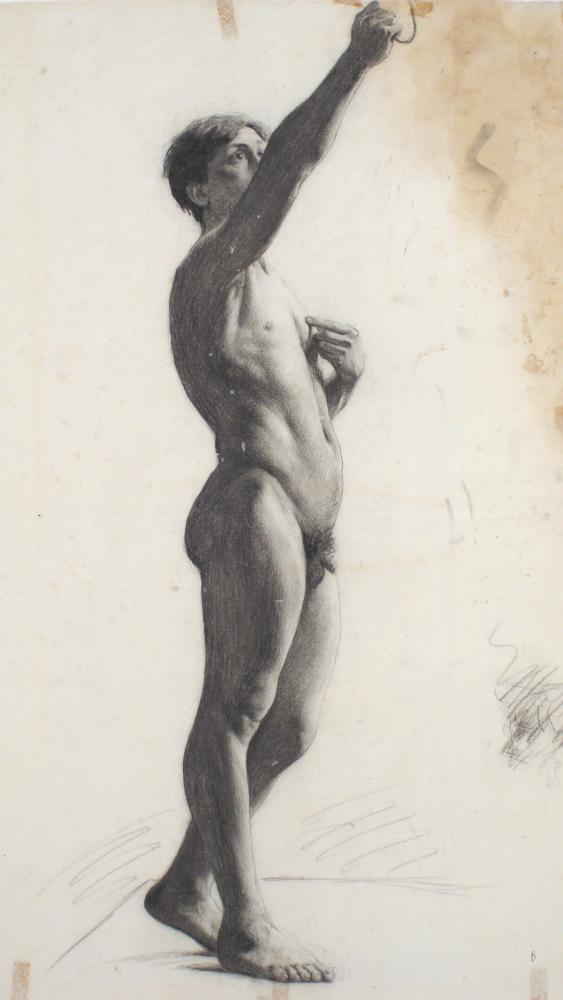
Pedro Weingärtner: Study, 1878, Pinacoteca Barão de Santo Ângelo

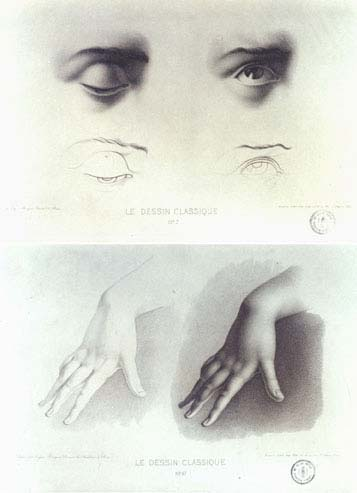
Study of eyes and hands, engraving, 19th century. One of the many imported graphic models used in educational settings for students, Dom João VI Museum

The exhaustive study of the human body and complete mastery of its representation in all positions and expressions were prerequisites for an academic artist’s success. Painters, for instance, besides convincingly and accurately depicting the human body, needed to create the illusion of a real space where their characters moved, and achieving this verisimilitude in an oil painting—the typical academic painting technique—was a long and complex process requiring significant preparation in scientific and cultural subjects beyond artistic talent. For sculptors and architects, there were specific preparations, including additional technical knowledge and sciences, such as casting and engineering, respectively.

Drawing was fundamental to mastering any of the aforementioned arts; without it, nothing was possible. There were courses in geometric drawing, ornamental drawing, statue drawing, natural elements, architectural elements, and finally, life drawing, enabling students to represent the complex scenes, groups, and panoramas expected of them in the future in painting, engraving, and sculpture. To aid learning, various collections of auxiliary materials were available: drawings and prints by European masters, molds of human body parts, drawings of nudes in detail, in various positions, and copies of famous paintings or statues, as copying both ancient and modern consecrated works was an important part of the academic teaching methodology. As Victor Meirelles stated when he was a professor of historical painting, in his report presenting his class program:

"Students attending the first year of this course should begin the study of painting by copying plaster busts and groups, then practicing the study of still life, studies that will greatly contribute not only to students understanding the effects of chiaroscuro and perspective but also to the arrangement and distribution of different objects that make up the composition, also practicing, in this way, the study of color."

Finally, there was a good specialized bibliography available on various art topics—anatomy and proportion treatises, painting and sculpture techniques, etc., although the poor general education of many students, unfamiliar with foreign languages, hindered deeper engagement with the offered material. Aware of these difficulties, Félix Émile Taunay, director of the AIBA from 1834 to 1854, translated some sources and wrote a Portuguese anatomy treatise in 1837, Epitome of Anatomy Relevant to the Fine Arts, followed by a compendium of the physiology of passions, and some general considerations on proportions, with the divisions of the human body; offered to the students of the Imperial Academy of Fine Arts in Rio de Janeiro, containing engravings of faces expressing various emotions, an iconography tracing back to Charles Le Brun, painter to Louis XIV. As a professor of life drawing, João Zeferino da Costa compiled a simplified manual for internal use, titled Mechanisms and Proportions of the Human Figure, where he gathered information from numerous European treatises and presented it in clear, accessible language. The existence of so many rules for composition and drawing did not prevent masters and students from understanding that these were basic technical tools, from which the artist’s imagination and creativity should build to bring life and interest to the final work, ensuring it did not become mechanical. This is evident in a passage from the manual, which also expresses the era’s ideals of beauty:

"Regarding the measurement rules we will present, we must note that their purpose is not to establish a single type for drawing the human figure, nor to reduce the artist’s genius and imaginative freedom to mathematical terms, which would be a great mistake. My aim is solely to provide the artist with an approximate limit, so to speak, of proportional harmony in a figure, as it must be noted that no two individuals have exactly matching characteristics and measurements, as measurements generally vary more or less among individuals in terms of height, age, sex, temperament, and especially among different races, etc. In essence, the objective is to provide the artist with a scientific, average, and reasonably precise reference point for understanding the well-proportioned human form, preventing exaggeration or caricature, as anything formed without proportions cannot present beauty and grace to the discerning viewer, such as overly thin or thick, overly long or short spines. Clearly, dwarfs, giants, hunchbacks, and the deformed are not beautiful, despite being equally human. It is pertinent to note that, as these rules are established exclusively for well-proportioned individuals, when the artist must depict individuals whose structure does not conform to these rules, they will have no choice but to rely on their knowledge, seeking to establish the specific relationships of the individual being copied, even if they deviate from the rules of beauty, and likewise for any object to be copied under identical conditions."

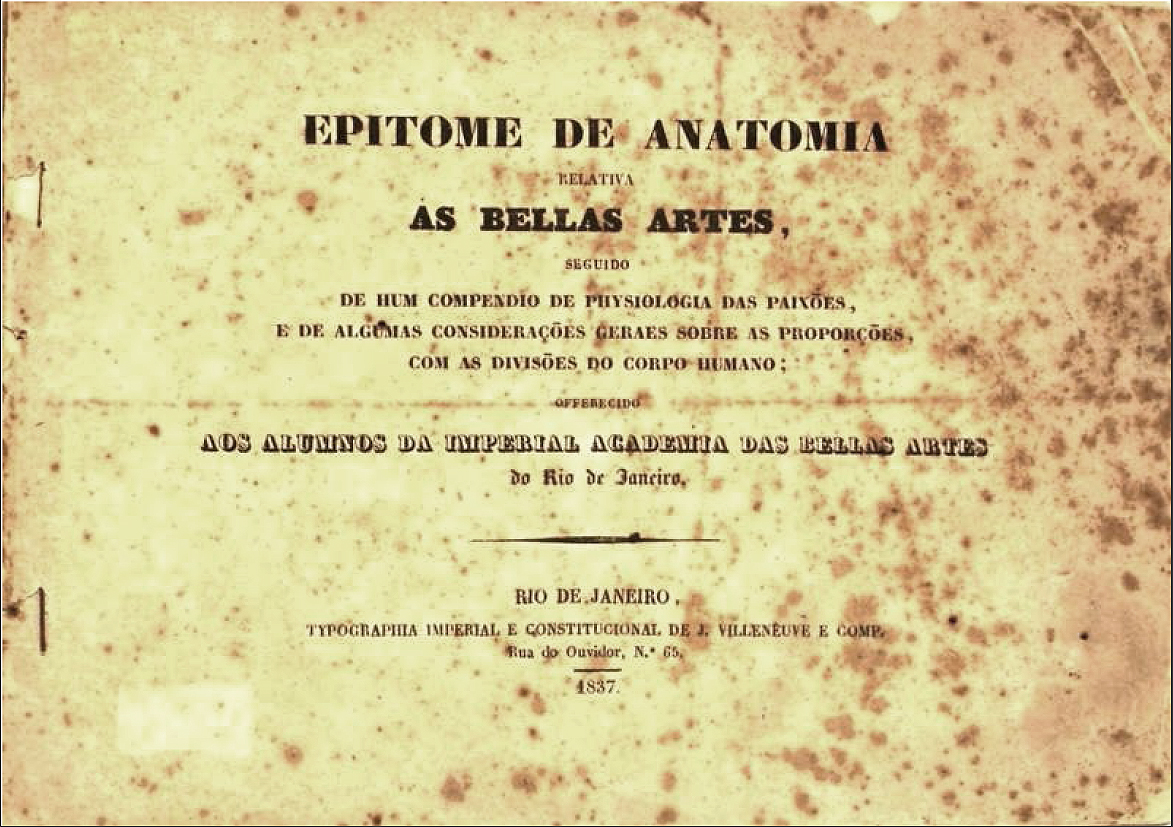
Cover of Félix-Émile Taunay’s Epitome of Anatomy Relevant to the Fine Arts, 1837, Dom João VI Museum

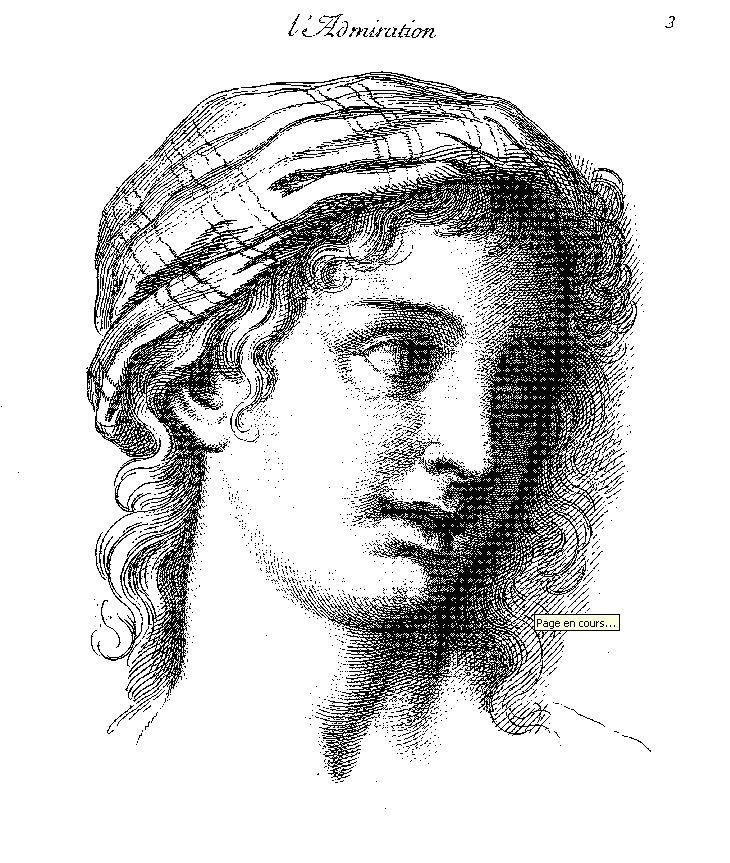
Charles Le Brun: Admiration, part of a series of studies on the expression of passions, referenced in Taunay’s treatise

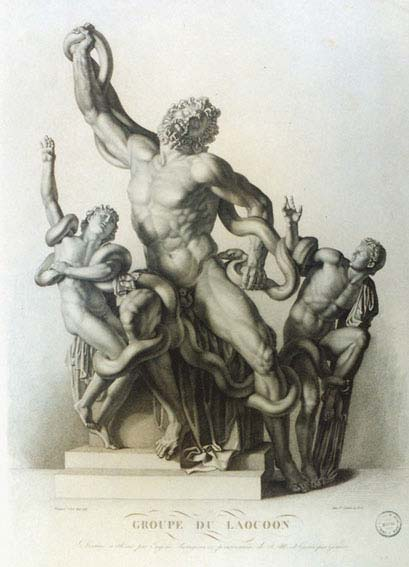
Engraving reproducing the Laocoön Group, 19th century, Dom João VI Museum

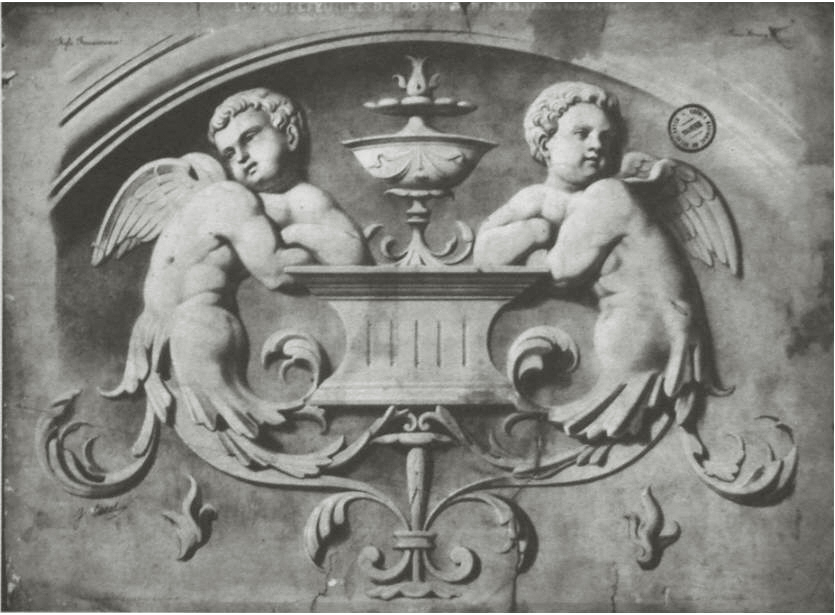
Print with an ornamental model for students of the Ornamental Sculpture course, Dom João VI Museum

=== Technical education ===
Technical trades were always essential auxiliaries to high-level art production. A bronze piece requires skilled founders; a painting, well-prepared canvas and pigments; a building, competent masons and skilled decorators, a fact understood since the founding of the Royal School. This group of artisans was also useful for the country’s industrialization and modernization. The Mission members themselves were, to some extent, familiar with several of these “minor arts,” as some technical knowledge was considered part of a comprehensive academic education and necessary for perfect integration between the creative artist and the various artisans recruited for major works such as public monuments or buildings.

However, these small, traditional branches were initially overlooked for economic reasons. They were reintroduced in the middle of the century due to the influence of European industrialization. Their curriculum then included geometry, trigonometry, mechanics, optics, perspective, and theory of shadows, in addition to life drawing. As supplementary teaching material, the Academy also offered models for copying—plaster and terracotta molds and prints of ornamental motifs. Due to the solid professional preparation they provided, these technical courses enabled workers to enter various industrial fields and were in high demand, especially the night shift, leading to the establishment of similar schools elsewhere in the country to meet growing regional demands: the São Paulo School of Arts and Crafts, the Emperor’s workshop-schools at Quinta da Boa Vista (1868) and Santa Cruz (1885), the Industrial School of the National Industry Auxiliary Society (1871), and the Polytechnic School (1893).

=== Advanced training ===
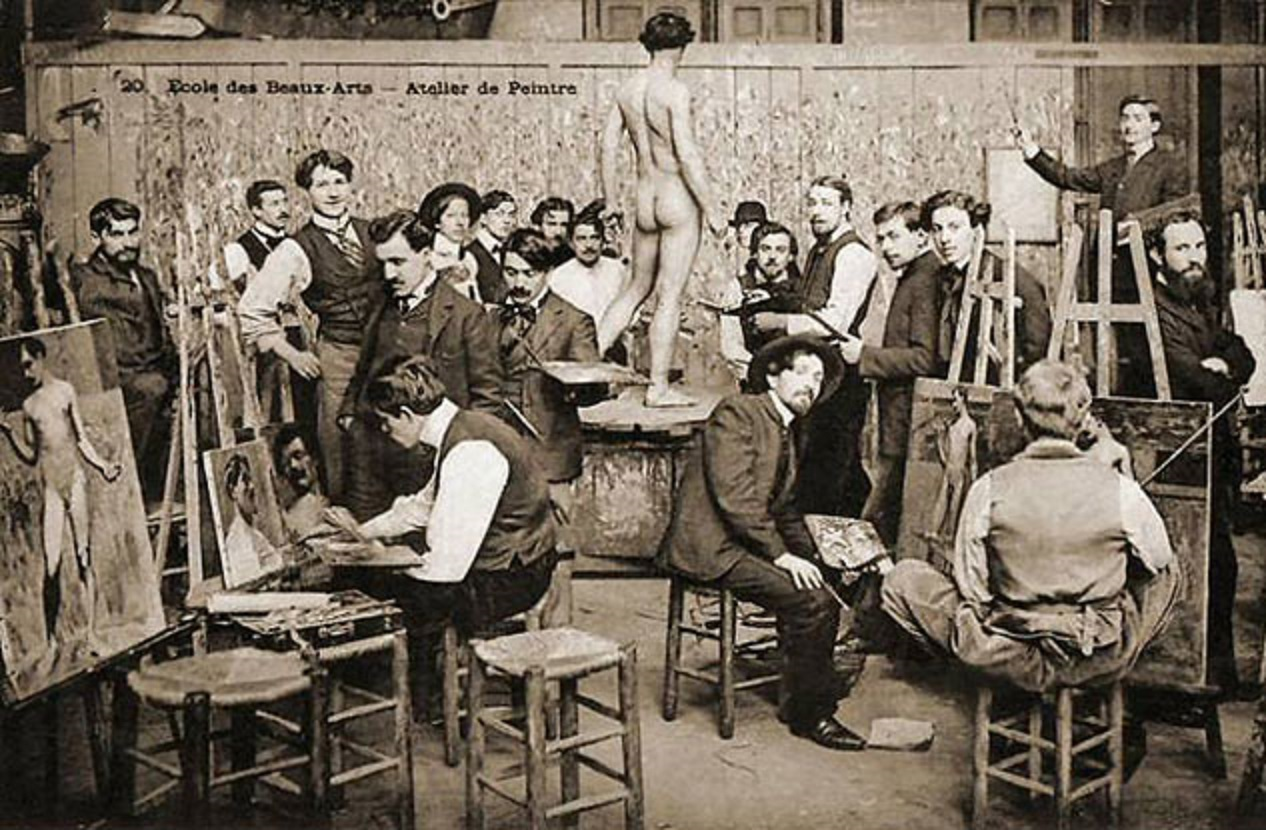
A life drawing class at the École des Beaux-Arts in Paris

Following the French Academy’s example, Brazil also instituted, starting in 1845, travel awards abroad for advanced technical training and broadening the cultural horizons of the most outstanding students, an experience considered fundamental to completing the academic education process. In Europe, particularly in France and Italy, artists had direct contact with the best tradition’s masters and the masterpieces of revered classics. During the imperial period, students sought admission to the École nationale supérieure des Beaux-Arts in Paris and the Accademia di San Luca in Rome, or studied as disciples of a master with a private atelier, provided they belonged to a reputable Academy. By the century’s end and into the Republic, the Academy of Fine Arts in Spain, the Académie Colarossi, the Académie de la Grande Chaumière, and the Académie Julian, perhaps the most sought after by Brazilians, became preferred. The artist was expected to learn from these models and emulate their principles in their own works, as expected by imperial patrons in Brazil. To monitor their progress, scholarship recipients were required to periodically send works to Brazil for evaluation by juries. A passage from a letter by Araújo Porto-Alegre, director of the Imperial Academy, to Victor Meirelles, then a government scholarship recipient, regarding the composition of the painting Decapitation of St. John the Baptist, illustrates the level of detail in teaching and, consequently, criticism:

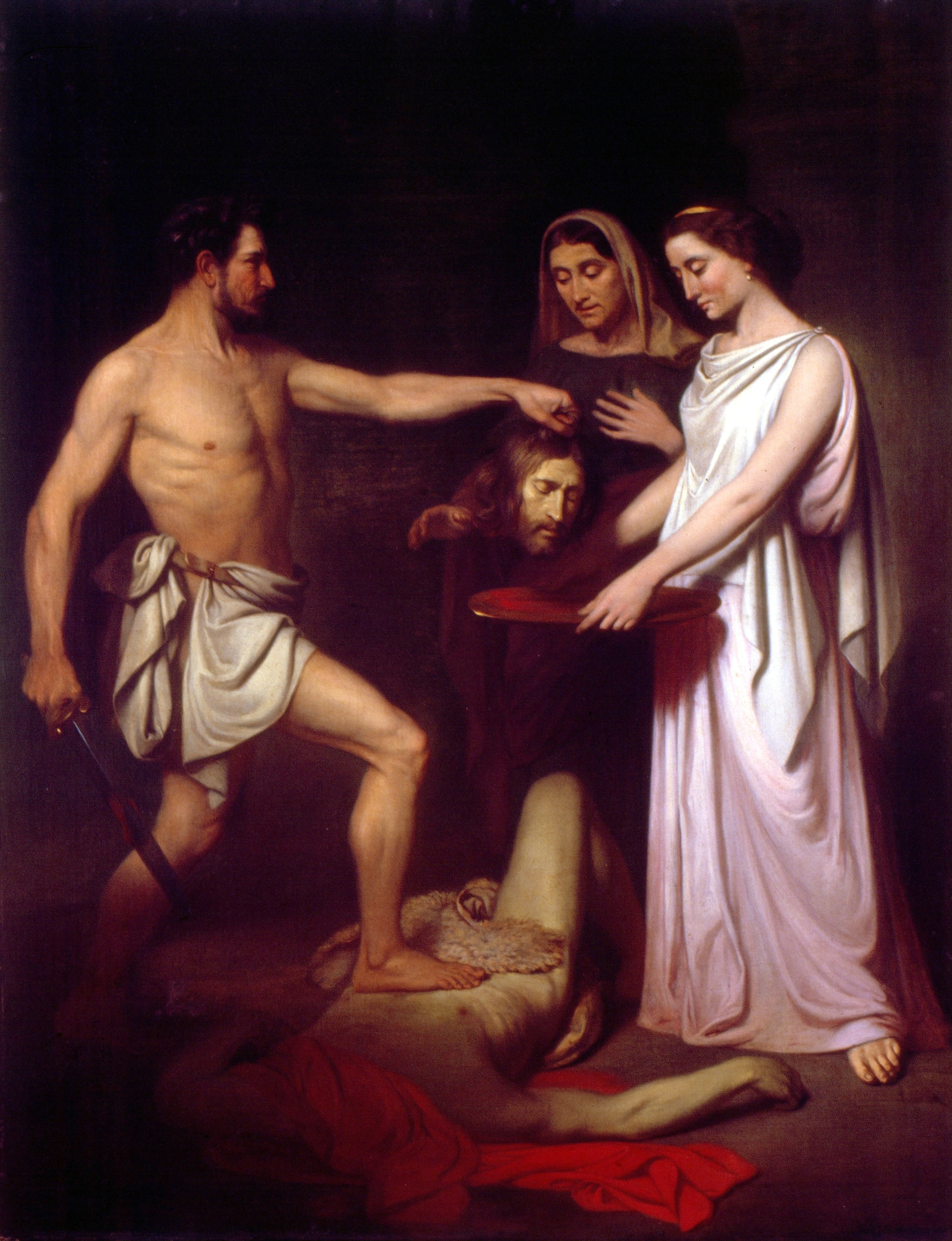
Victor Meirelles: Decapitation of St. John the Baptist, 1855, MNBA, a work sent from Europe for evaluation

"Before composing, consider the overall action, then each of your characters: study them morally and physiologically so that each, on its own, can form a harmonious and truthful whole. (...) Study the theory of shadows and perspective well, as without these foundations, you will struggle greatly: they will provide a perfect understanding of light modifications, planes, and reliefs; copy scenographic drawings, as this study includes the backgrounds of panels, etc., etc."

Elsewhere, he analyzes unsatisfactory aspects:

"The executioner’s figure has a good head; the neck, thorax, and abdomen are tolerably modeled and better colored, as they lack dirty tones, but it seems to me there is a slight myological flaw in the intercostal region. The right arm, regarding the forearm, is not bad, but it lacks energy in accentuation and clarity in musculature: the deltoid should be more fibrous, as should the triceps brachii be more defined; as for the forearm, wrist, and hand, these were not studied with as much care as the thorax and abdomen. [...] The legs seem short and somewhat inert in the way the musculature is accentuated: what is perfectly modeled is the outer part of the popliteal region and, above all, the posterior insertion of the thigh’s triceps."

As seen, a work created under this system could not be the result of fleeting inspiration or impulse but rather of a methodical accumulation of planned and considered actions, where the artist’s hand, the gestural and expressive individuality so valued today, left few or no evident traces, which would have been considered bad taste or ineptitude, in pursuit of the standardized, ideal, timeless, and collective perfection that was the Academy’s goal and philosophical program.

=== Styles, genres, and ideologies ===
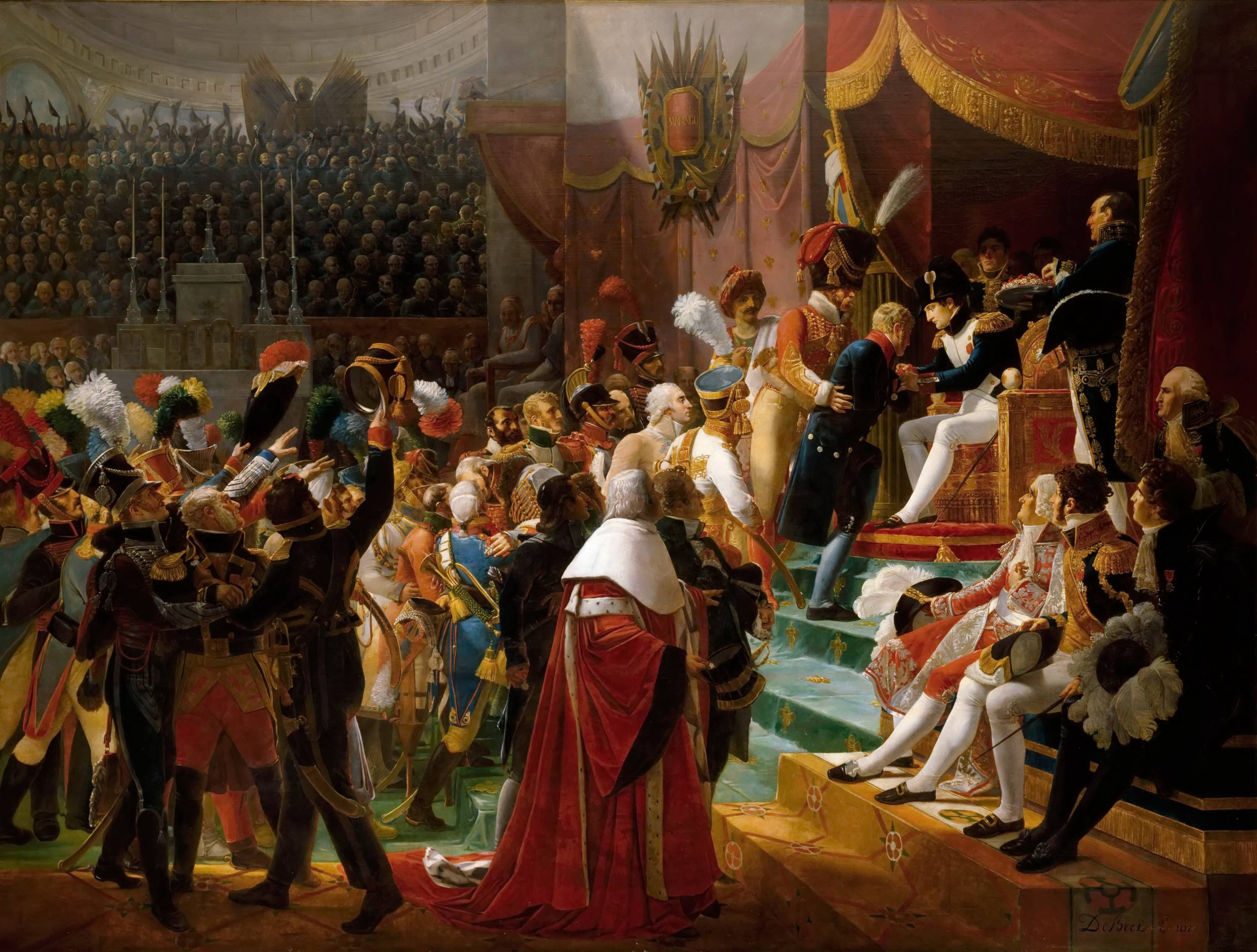
Debret: First distribution of the decorations of the Legion of Honor, July 14, 1804, 1812, a work composed in France, illustrating the Neoclassical spirit brought to Brazil

Pedro Américo: Independence or Death, 1888, Museu do Ipiranga, one of the icons of Brazilian academic painting

In terms of style, national Academicism was born under the influence of Neoclassicism, inspired by painters such as Jacques-Louis David, the leading figure of the French Neoclassical school and master of Jean-Baptiste Debret, a member of the French Mission. Neoclassicism provided the basic formal guidelines for the methodology implemented in Brazil for constructing the masterpiece—rigor in composition, clear drawing, precise anatomy, and an ethical and civic appeal. However, pure Neoclassicism bore little fruit in Brazil, hindered by the precarious operating conditions of the Imperial Academy in its early days, and by the time it stabilized, the general trend had shifted toward Romanticism, where Brazilian academic art reached its zenith. Romanticism was an aesthetic and philosophical current that fueled various nationalist movements in Europe, and in Brazil, it had a similar impact. It arrived with some delay but at the precise moment when the country was engaged in a declaredly modernizing and nationalist process after recent independence from Portugal, aiming to present a progressive and civilized face to the world. Its absorption by the AIBA was highly selective, giving it a palatial, optimistic, and austere character, free from the emotional excesses of European Romanticism and the morbid tendencies of the Byronic current. Thus, the government encouraged the production of idealistic and laudatory art of the State and its achievements toward civilization, reconstructing historical scenes and creating a powerful symbolic imaginary that endures to this day. This art, essentially intended for a social function, besides demonstrating the enlightenment of the elites and aiding in public education, served as an ideological tool and a calling card for Brazil’s integration into an international capitalist order. By the century’s end, Romantic Academicism began giving way to the introduction of Realist elements, but as Lilia Moritz Schwarcz notes, this was limited to the depiction of anatomical details, objects, and nature, with idealistic Romanticism continuing to dominate in concept, purpose, and atmosphere.

Painting was always the most vibrant and flourishing artistic field during Brazilian Academicism, producing names such as Victor Meirelles, Pedro Américo, Rodolfo Amoedo, and Almeida Júnior, with contributions from many independent or AIBA-affiliated foreigners. The most prestigious genre was historical painting, reserved for the most talented, requiring extensive general culture and perfect technical mastery. It appealed to morality, virtue, and patriotism, inviting viewers to reflect on the ethics the artist wished to convey and aiming to exert a positive educational influence on the public. Landscape, official portraiture, and religious scenes/portraits also flourished. Toward the century’s end, natural landscape, still life, and domestic scene genres gained significant popularity, foreshadowing the bourgeois renewals of the coming century, with characteristically regional figures in a realist style, as seen in the work of Pedro Weingärtner with the gauchos and immigrants of Rio Grande do Sul and Almeida Júnior with the caipiras and caboclos of São Paulo.

In sculpture, some figures stand out: Francisco Chaves Pinheiro, a prolific but understudied long-time AIBA sculpture professor, Almeida Reis, excluded from the Academy for not conforming to its standards but author of consistent and expressive works, and above all Rodolfo Bernardelli, who overshadowed all others in his generation and later directed the Imperial Academy’s successor. Generally, in sculpture, classical models were treated with slightly more freedom, though themes remained elevated, drawn from ancient myths and allegories. Wood was abandoned in favor of marble and bronze, which required more laborious and time-consuming work but were considered nobler materials. Sculpture had a significant market in the construction of various monuments and the decoration of public buildings, associated with its “lesser” counterpart, ornamental reliefs. Architecture remained secondary, but the intense activity of the Frenchman Grandjean de Montigny from the outset, followed by some of his students, such as Joaquim Cândido Guilhobel and José Maria Jacinto Rebelo, transformed the urban landscape of the period. The Imperial Academy building, designed by Grandjean, was perhaps the official prototype of Neoclassical architecture in Brazil.

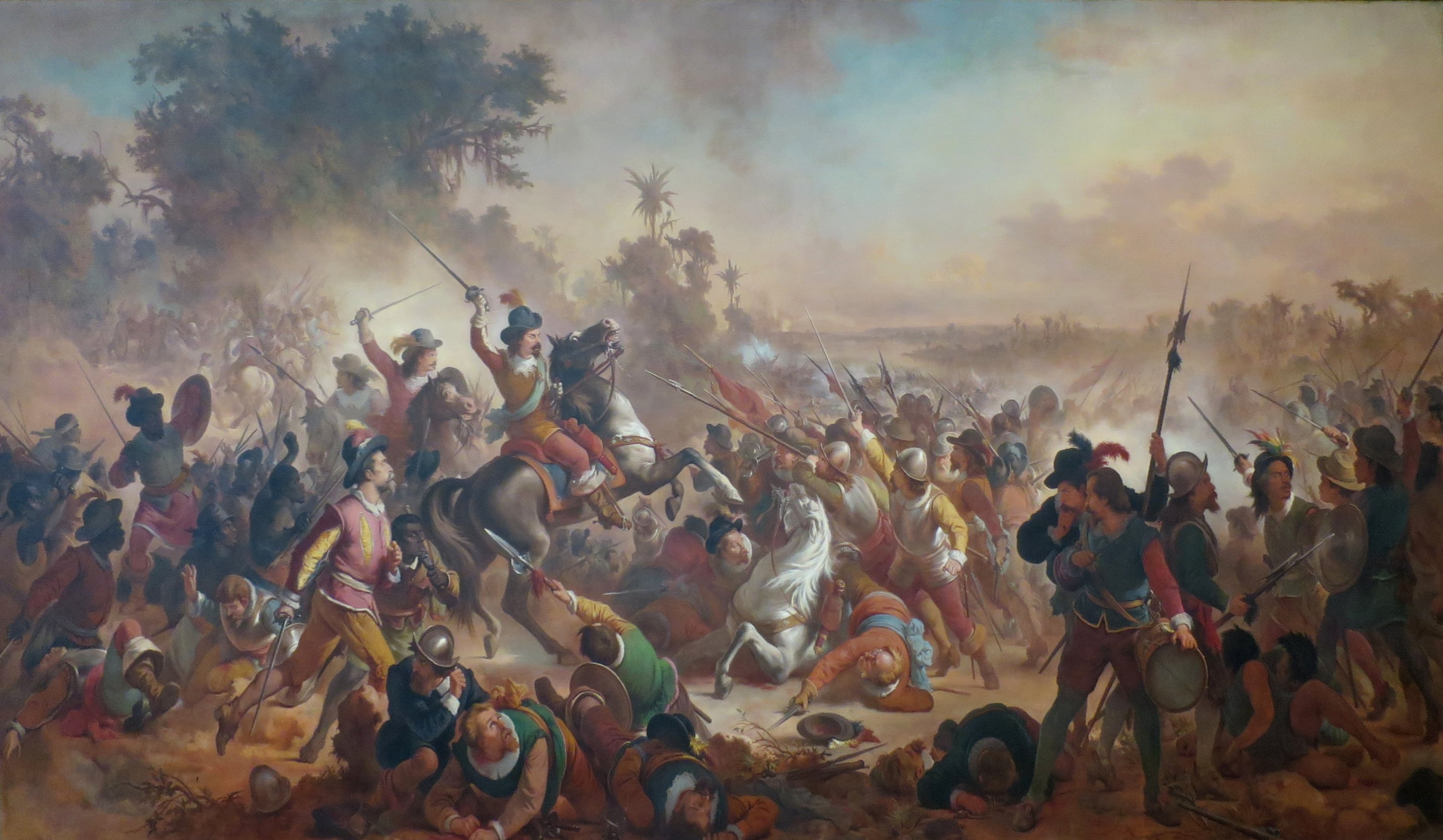
Victor Meirelles: The Battle of Guararapes, 1879, MNBA

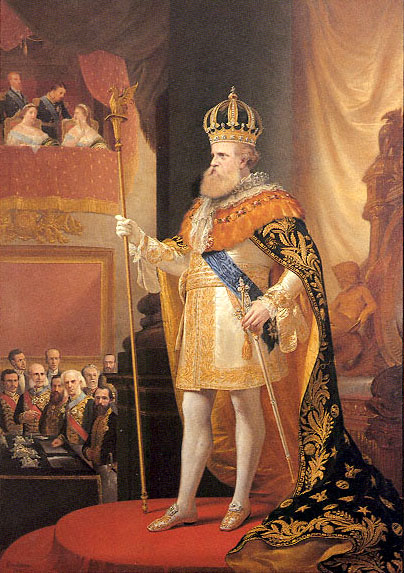
Pedro Américo: Speech from the Throne, 1872, Imperial Museum of Brazil

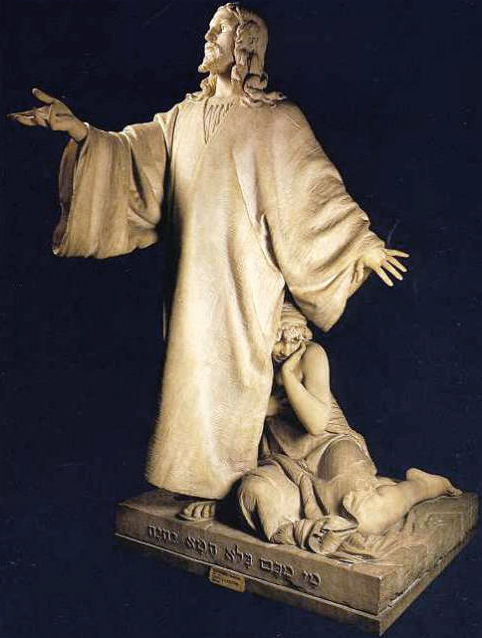
Rodolpho Bernardelli: Christ and the Adulteress, 1881, MNBA

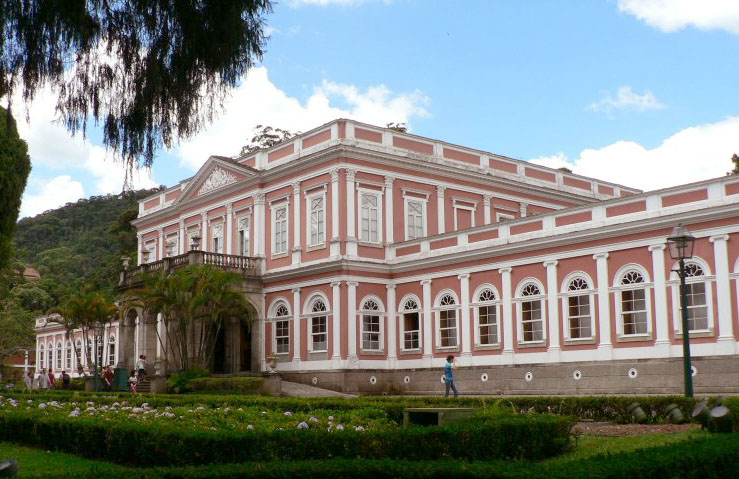
Júlio Frederico Koeler, Joaquim Cândido Guilhobel, and José Maria Jacinto Rebelo: Imperial Palace of Petrópolis
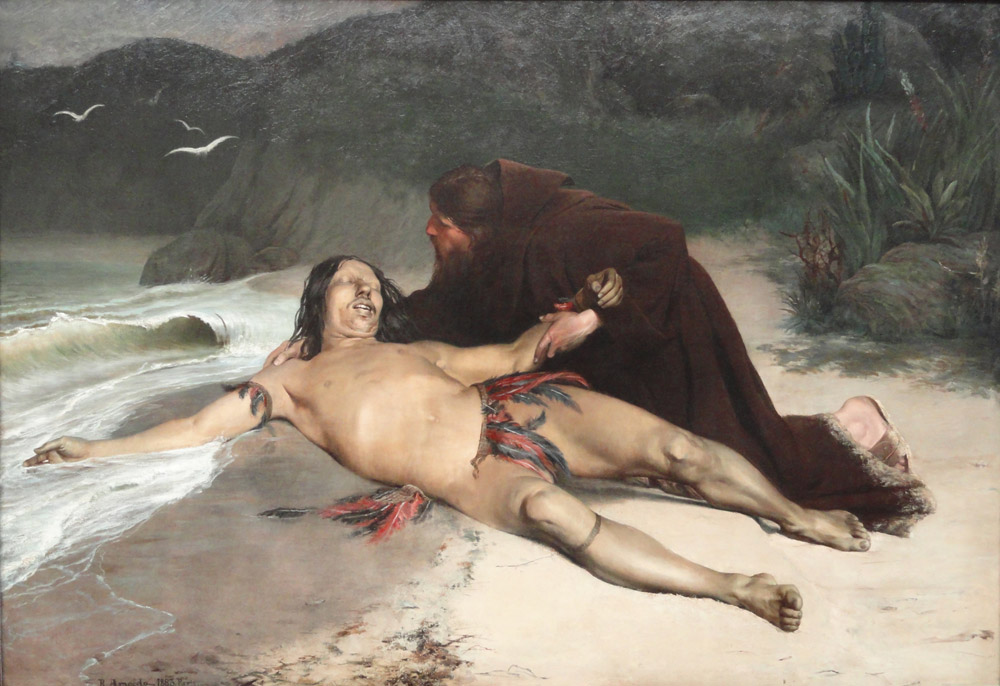
Rodolfo Amoedo: The Last Tamoio, 1883, MNBA

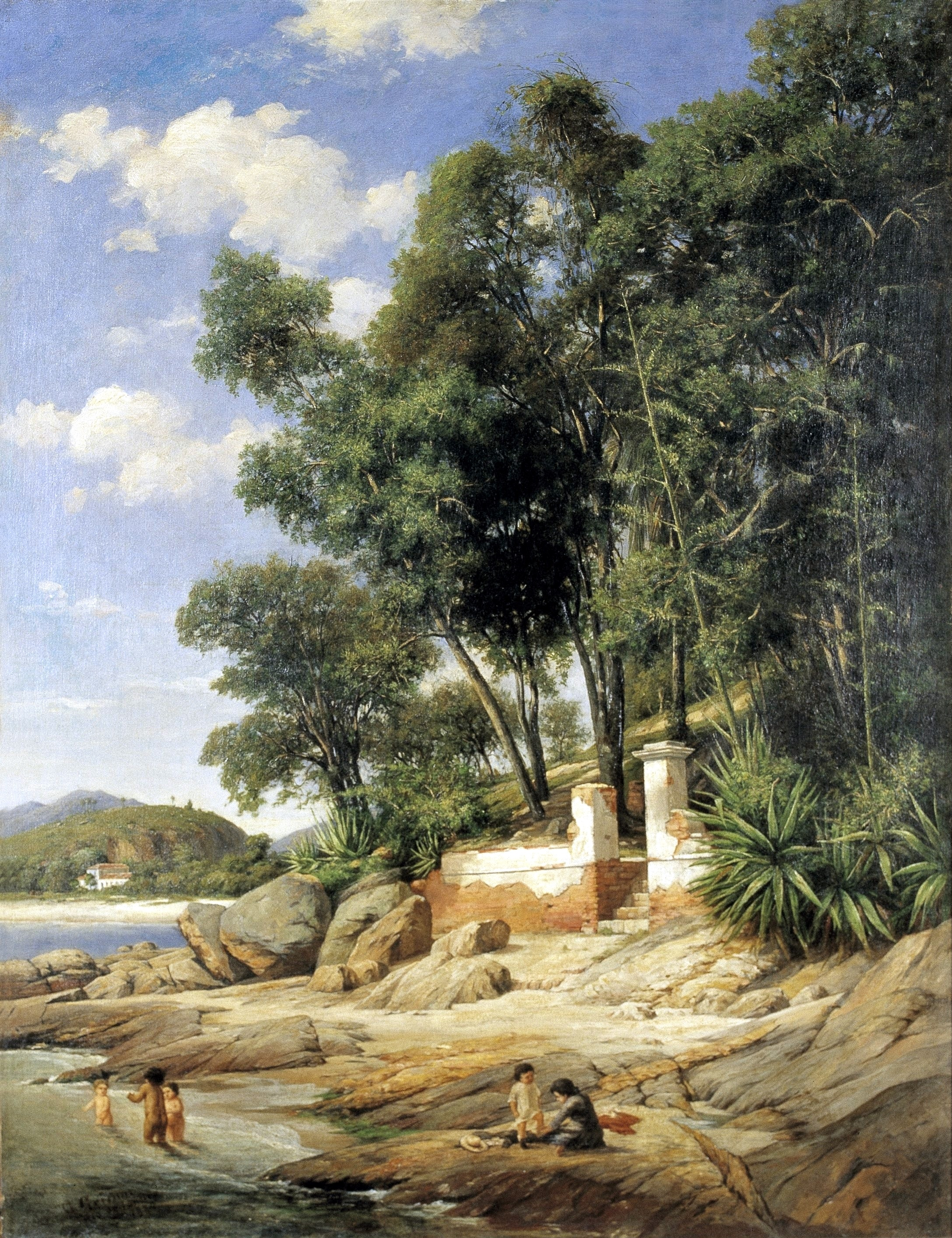
Georg Grimm: View of Cavalão, 1884, MNBA

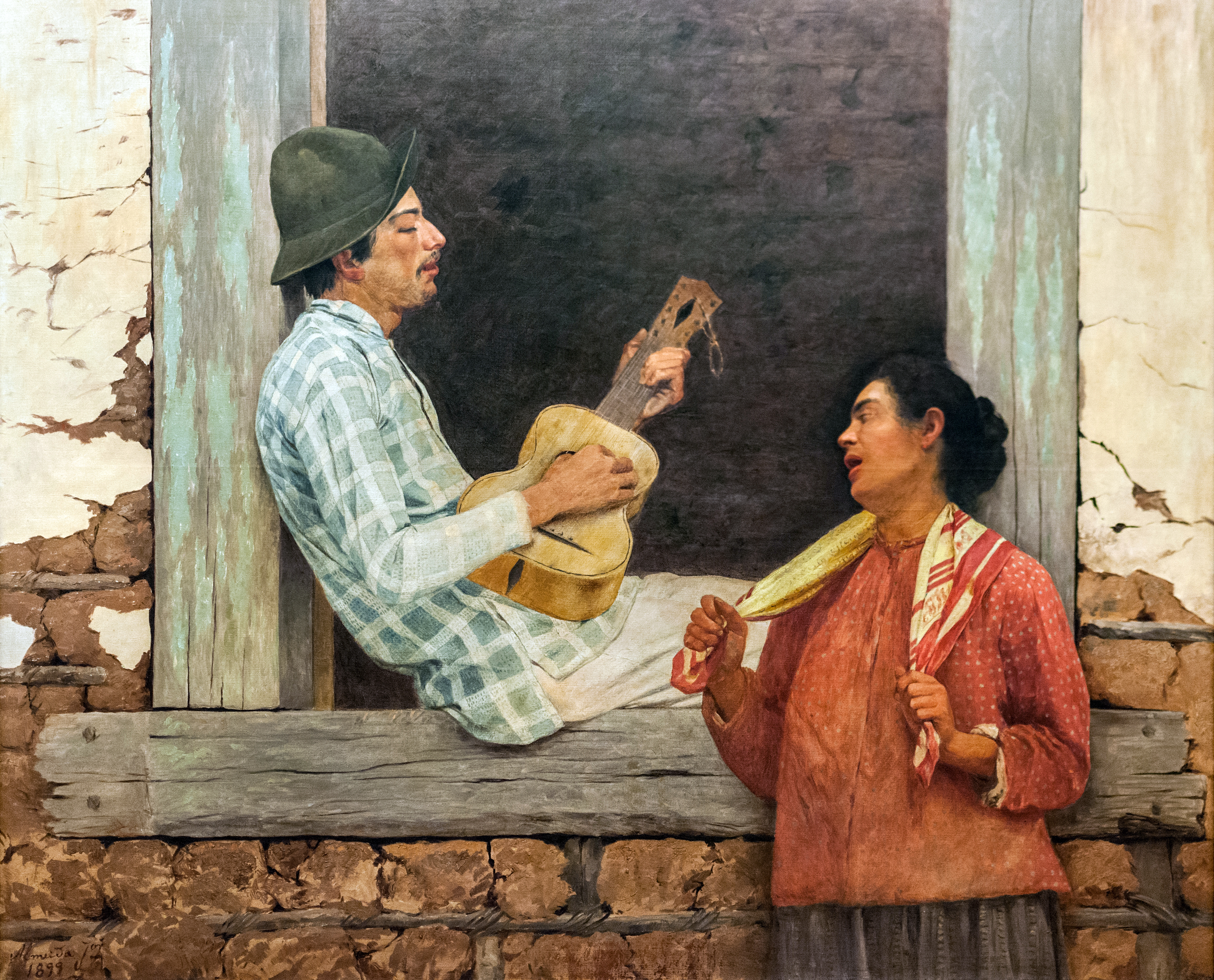
Almeida Júnior: The Guitar Player, 1899, Pinacoteca do Estado de São Paulo

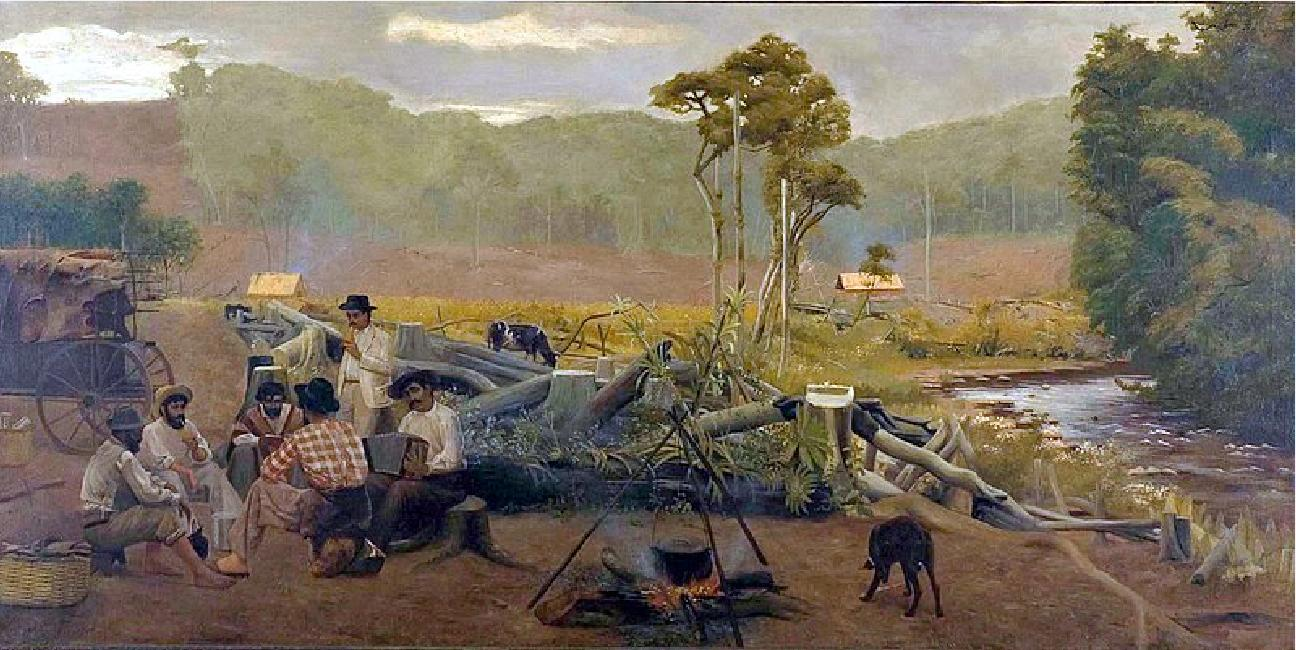
Pedro Weingärtner: Gaucho Carters Drinking Chimarrão, 1911, Pinacoteca Aldo Locatelli

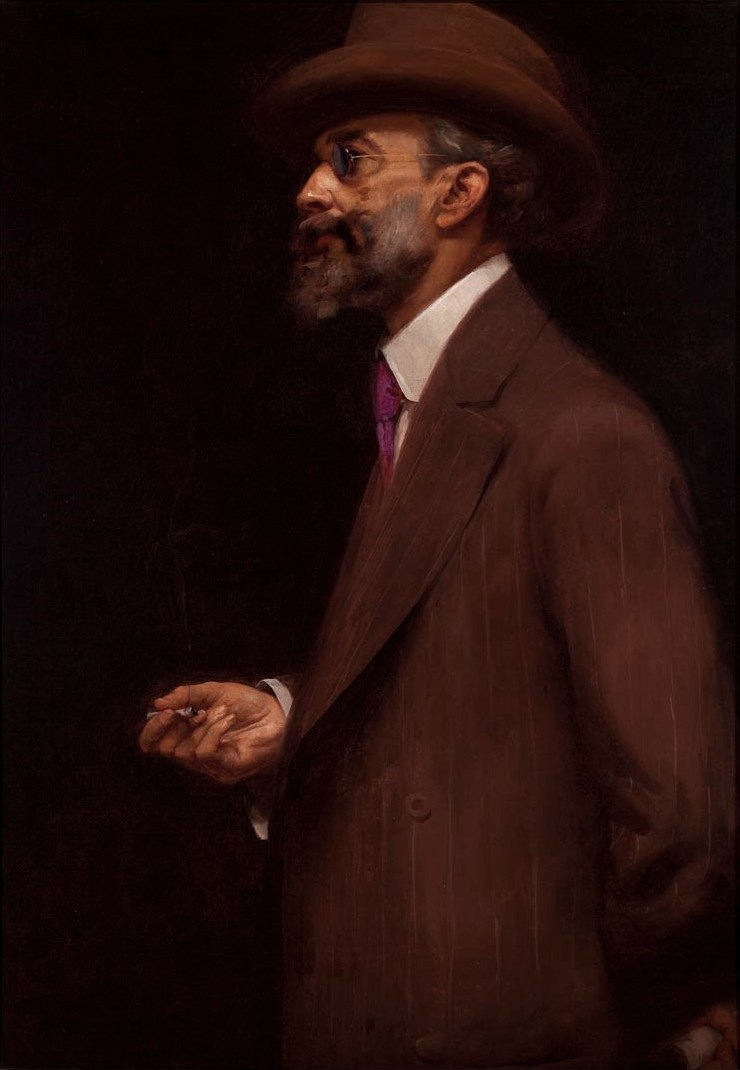
Eliseu Visconti: Portrait of Gonzaga Duque, 1912, MNBA

=== Notable academic artists ===
The list below is far from complete but gives an idea of the strong predominance of painting over other arts—all those listed, unless otherwise noted, were painters:

Jean-Baptiste Debret, Grandjean de Montigny (architect), Nicolas-Antoine Taunay, Félix Taunay, Simplício Rodrigues de Sá, Agostinho da Motta, Henrique José da Silva, Francisco Chaves Pinheiro (sculptor), Manuel de Araújo Porto-Alegre, Afonso Falcoz, Georg Grimm, Henri Nicolas Vinet, José Octavio Corrêa Lima (sculptor), Victor Meirelles, Rodolfo Amoedo, Cândido Caetano de Almeida Reis (sculptor), Henrique Bernardelli, Rodolfo Bernardelli (sculptor and painter), Pedro Américo, Eliseu Visconti, João Zeferino da Costa, Arthur Timótheo da Costa, Oscar Pereira da Silva, Belmiro de Almeida, Almeida Júnior, Décio Villares (sculptor and painter), Pedro Weingärtner, Georgina de Albuquerque, Carlos Chambelland, Pedro Alexandrino, Giovanni Battista Castagneto, Helios Seelinger.

=== Music ===
Music, included in Lebreton’s program, was not initially offered by the AIBA, and Academicism in Brazilian musical arts flourished in another institution, the Rio de Janeiro Conservatory, founded by Francisco Manuel da Silva in 1841. However, this school had a more subdued activity, despite state subsidies, and only began operating effectively in 1848 with six teachers. In 1855, it left its original headquarters and was installed in the AIBA building, which took over its administration. That year, competitions for selecting teachers were organized, and travel awards for studying abroad were established. Despite the Conservatory’s existence and a few other dilettante associations and clubs, musical life in Brazil during the Second Empire was, according to Vasco Mariz, extremely poor in creativity, even though public concerts and recitals were not rare, and domestic music practice was widespread. The repertoire, however, consisted mainly of European composers’ works and minor pieces by native authors, such as modinhas and dances, with the sole significant exception of Carlos Gomes’s operas, which were of far superior quality to the national average, enjoyed great popularity in Brazil, and brought the country’s name to the global musical scene of his time. Only in the Republic did other more qualified and creative composers emerge, beginning to formulate a nationalist musical idiom, including Henrique Oswald, Leopoldo Miguez, and Alberto Nepomuceno. At this point, the Conservatory was replaced by the National Institute of Music, with Leopoldo Miguez as director, who initiated studies to improve teaching. Under Nepomuceno’s management, the Institute gained a new headquarters, reformed its curriculum and internal regulations, implemented competitions for hiring teaching staff, and decentralized leadership. In 1923, the Institute’s first orchestra was formed, conducted by Francisco Braga. Under Luciano Gallet’s administration, a new curriculum reform began, but the Federal University of Rio de Janeiro then absorbed the Institute, transforming it into its School of Music.

- Carlos Gomes: Alvorada. Symphonic Orchestra of the Fluminense Federal University

Alvorada

== The market for academic art ==
The close association of the Imperial Academy with the established power meant that the main consumer market for academic art was the State and the imperial family, as acknowledged by Araújo Porto-Alegre in 1854. The most significant works of national Academicism were produced for this sphere, but the growing number of Academy graduates struggled to sustain their artistic careers due to the scarcity of opportunities and commissions. Students of technical courses could find employment in the emerging industry and in engineering and decoration activities, some draftsmen secured jobs with the Army, some engravers at the Mint, and architects in the Public Works Department, but for many others, there was no choice but to adopt other professions. However, between 1870 and 1880, there was an expansion in the circulation of works among the nobility and wealthy bourgeoisie, driven by the popularization of depoliticized themes such as landscapes, genre scenes, portraits, and still lifes, and the opening of the first commercial art gallery in 1875 in Rio. Another stimulus was the growing specialization of art criticism, led by Gonzaga Duque, and its dissemination in widely circulated magazines and newspapers, contributing to the education of broader public segments. In this movement toward true popularization of official and academic art, the 1879 Salon became a landmark. It featured two major works, The Battle of Avaí by Pedro Américo and The Battle of Guararapes by Victor Meirelles. The public success was overwhelming, attracting virtually the entire population of Rio de Janeiro and sparking a public debate about art that remained active for months.

== End of the cycle ==
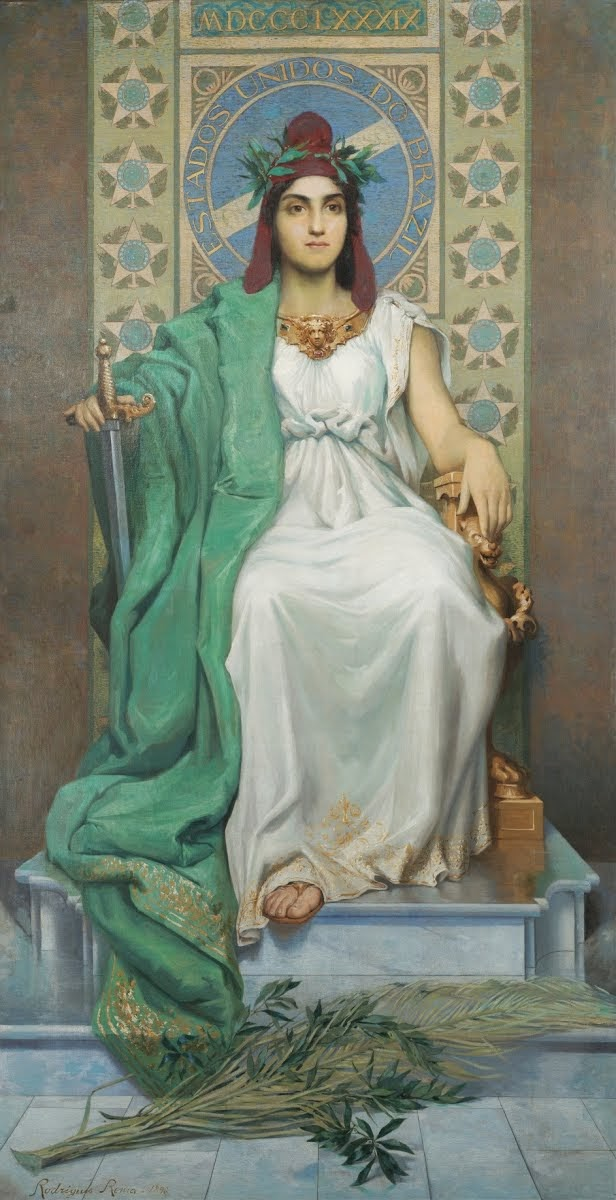
Manuel Lopes Rodrigues: Allegory of the Republic, 1896, Bahia Museum of Art

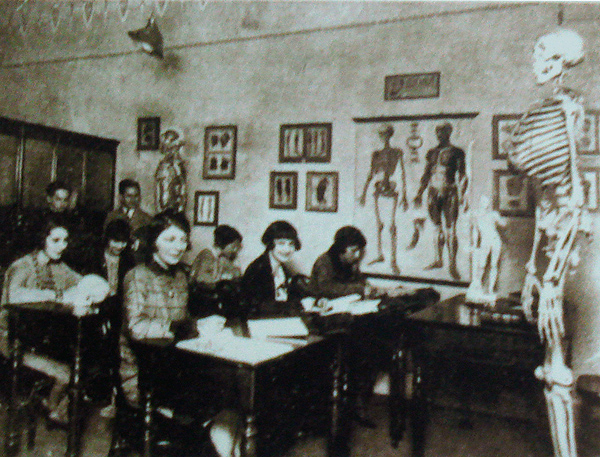
Anatomy class at the Institute of Arts of UFRGS, 1928

In Europe, the academic system began to be questioned with the rise of the Romantic movement, which prioritized individual creativity and independent genius unbound by external controls. Until the mid-19th century, most artists were absorbed by the academies, but thereafter, increasingly important talents faced rejection by the official system, primarily supported by the conservative bourgeoisie. With the growing prestige of Impressionists from 1874, whose principles differed, the old system began to collapse.

In Brazil, the process was similar. Criticisms of the academic system emerged from its inception and persisted throughout its history. After the controversies faced by Lebreton, Silva, Taunay, and Porto-Alegre, in the 1870s, criticism intensified with the appearance of Revista Illustrada, directed by Angelo Agostini, which initiated discussions about national identity and supported alternative art practices, such as those advocated by Georg Grimm and his group. Gonzaga Duque was another influential critic of the time, attacking the Academy’s detachment from Brazil’s cultural reality and the lack of originality among faithful followers of ancient masters, accusing them of being mere copyists without genius. A passage from his writing reveals the changing cultural environment of the late century:

"The painter" (Belmiro de Almeida, whom he supported) "by disregarding historical subjects to focus on a domestic subject, abundantly proves that he understands the desideratum of modern societies and knows that the concern of today’s philosophers is humanity represented by that unique force inaccessible to the iconoclastic blows of ridiculousness, the firmest, highest, and most admirable of institutions—the family."

Regarding the Academy’s Art Gallery, the school’s official collection, he said:

"The Art Gallery is there (...) How pitiful! How helpless! (...) Borrowed or slavishly imitated conceptions, sloppy, weak, useless execution; everything there is bad, worthless, or dull; it does not affirm talent, nor does it demonstrate knowledge."

With the proclamation of the Republic, the old Imperial Academy was converted into the National School of Fine Arts, with Rodolfo Bernardelli as director. Bernardelli was a sculpture professor and a highly respected artist among many influential intellectuals. However, as a controversial figure managing amid accusations of bias and incompetence, problems escalated, with classes being closed, the dismissal of prominent figures such as Victor Meirelles, the withdrawal of several students, and motions by professors against the leadership, considered harmful. Under these pressures, Bernardelli left the post in 1915. The school survived a few more years, relaxing its technical demands and being invigorated by the increasing participation of women and the rapid emergence of successive aesthetic trends, such as Symbolism, Impressionism, Expressionism, and Art Nouveau.

When Brazil’s higher education was restructured, the School was absorbed by the UFRJ in 1931, marking the end of one system and the beginning of another dominated by Modernism, whose principles confronted predictability and routine in artistic practice and the official School’s methodical discipline, proposing paths with different values. Despite the criticisms, the traditional Academy model inspired the establishment of similar art schools across Brazil, such as the Rio de Janeiro School of Arts and Crafts (1856), the São Paulo School of Arts and Crafts (1873), the Nóbrega School of Arts and Crafts in Pernambuco (1880), and the Fine Arts Schools maintained by regional universities, such as the Arts Institute of the Federal University of Rio Grande do Sul (1908), proving its efficiency and capacity for adaptation and renewal.

== Appreciation ==
It has become commonplace to characterize Academicism as an authoritarian and retrograde school. Since the rise of the modern avant-garde at the end of the 19th century, there have been increasing criticisms of its methods and ideals, and the success of Modernism throughout much of the 20th century naturally led to the dismissal of the immediate past as outdated, in an indiscriminate and biased praise of everything anti-authoritarian and breaking established canons of previous centuries, viewing history as a process of continuous evolution culminating in modernity. Today, this perspective is widely considered an anachronism, though it persists in many scholarly circles and even in popular opinion. However, this attitude prevents recognizing and understanding values important to the culture that gave rise to them—necessarily different from those of today—and the valid and creative forms of dialogue with the past established by academics. The most recent critical trend questions the formulation of qualitative or teleological comparison criteria between periods. This trend emphasizes that a fairer appreciation requires one to attempt to understand the spirit of that period and see things as the people of that period did.

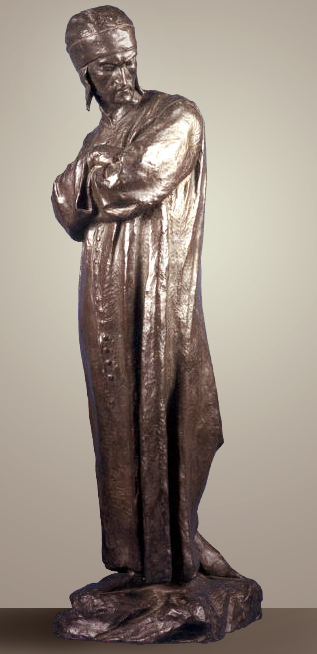
Almeida Reis: Dante Returning from Exile, 1889, MNBA. Almeida Reis lost his scholarship because his style did not conform to official canons.

Perhaps the main criticism still leveled at Academicism, inherited from the modernist view, is its alleged rigidity in concepts and ideals. Oswald de Andrade stated: "We bear ill will toward Academicism because it stifles all youthful aspirations and all powerful initiatives. To overcome it, we destroy it." The modernist rejection was complete, often using violently mocking and humiliating jargon, describing Academicism as a conformist and conservative school for excluding anything that did not fit the rules passed down through generations of masters, presumed to be perennial and immutable. There is some truth to this, as Brazilian Academicism was largely a government-controlled movement that served an official purpose, particularly during Dom Pedro II’s reign. Due to this control, some artists flourished on the margins of the school or abandoned it in search of environments and groups more aligned with their independent and inquisitive nature, sometimes paying a high price in terms of misunderstanding and lack of opportunities for this nonconformism. Modernly, the term Academicism has been used pejoratively by anti-intellectual movements, also for its elitist character, requiring vast scholarly knowledge accessible to few.

Another objection to Brazilian Academicism targets its origin and introduction, viewing the French Mission’s work as a violent intervention in the natural evolution of national styles, as Brazil until then lived in an atmosphere still strongly marked by Baroque traits that had recently reached maturity with Aleijadinho and Mestre Ataíde, whose artistic legacy was abruptly dissolved, without the possibility of organic continuation, with the official introduction of the new method, which brought with it a new aesthetic. Others, however, such as Ronald de Carvalho—a promoter of the Modern Art Week of 1922—saw the Mission as a healthy renewal of national arts, pulling Brazil out of the stagnation of a movement exhausted in Europe decades earlier, bringing to the country "good teachers and good doctrine."

Nevertheless, the discipline imposed by the Academy was a decisive factor in enabling many talents to find their own voice and express values—expressed with great style and consummate artistry—that were determinant in a certain era of national history. Finding expression in academics, those values shaped much of present Brazilian culture and the nation’s self-conception, through the construction of a repertoire of historical scenes, portraits, landscapes, and regional human types, still with immense visual appeal and evocative power, fixed in Brazil’s collective memory through their widespread dissemination in school textbooks.

Nor was the Brazilian Academy a mere transposition of a European model to a different soil, nor was it as rigid in its concepts as its detractors claim, as history records its adaptations to periodic crises and native circumstances, a flexibility that allowed it to survive for a century amid the challenges of consolidating a new, poor, and modernizing country—a process it significantly helped promote. The testimonies left in the art of its graduates also contradict this, largely following the stylistic evolution from Neoclassicism to the new schools of the 20th century, in fact being avant-garde in several respects within the art produced in Brazil at the time, both in terms of working methods and stylistic approaches. Rafael Denis argues that Brazilian academic art cannot be understood from either a unilateral perspective of imperialist imposition or a purely nationalistic viewpoint. All processes of cultural value transfer involve substantial, unpredictable, and meaningful changes that require accommodations on both sides. Furthermore, the emphasis on impersonality, professionalism, and the pursuit of timeless and collective perfection, in which the individual glory of the creator is overshadowed by his efficiency as a creator of positive symbols for a state presumed to be enlightened and benevolent and for a people that desired to be happy, is particularly relevant. The concept of unity and education merits consideration as a pivotal and optimistic social aspect of this educational project, which has been the subject of extensive discussion.

=== The continuity of a successful model ===
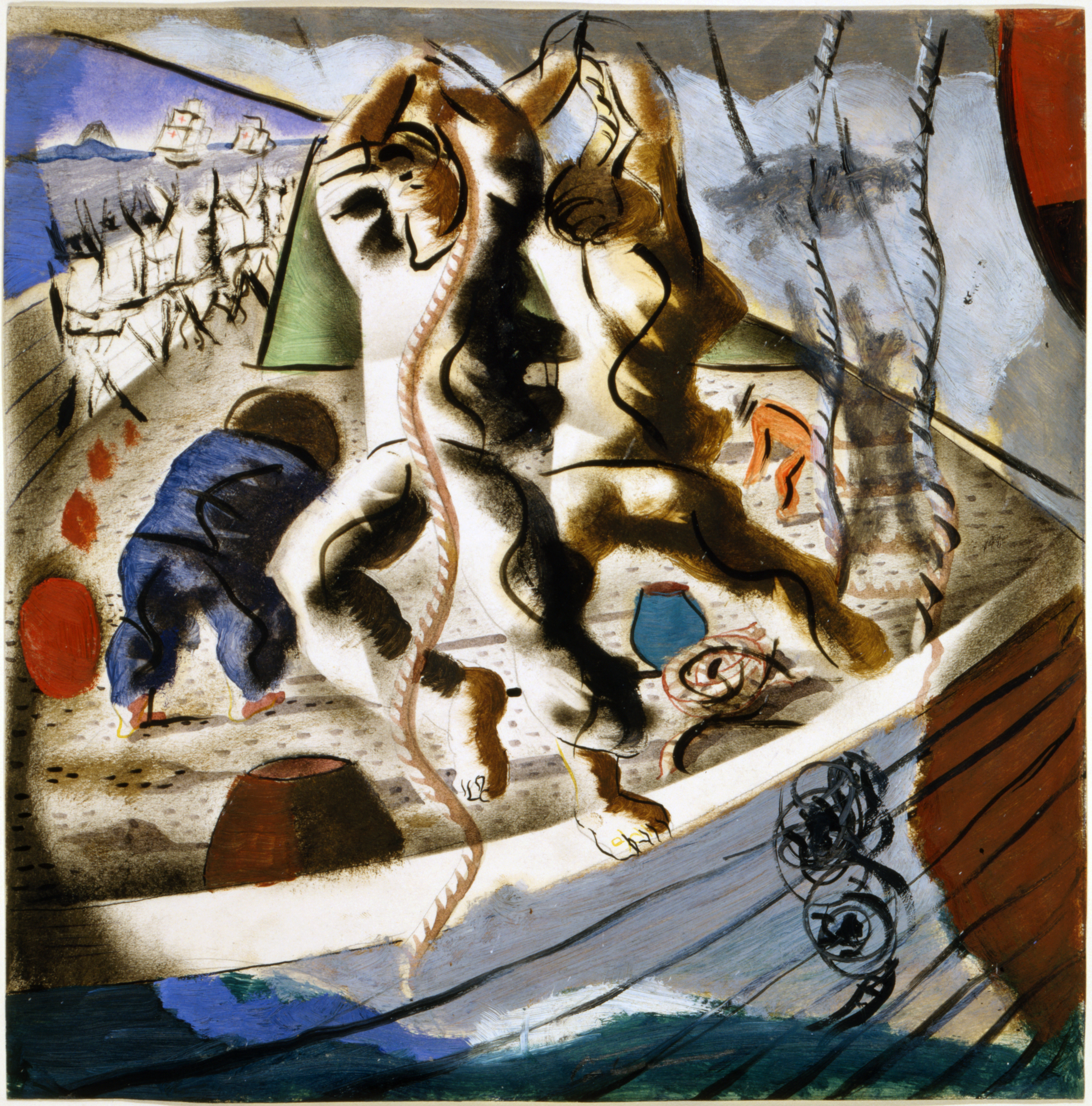
The Discovery of the Land, 1941. Mural painting by Portinari in the Library of Congress building, Washington, D.C.

The academic tradition inaugurated by John VI and his French collaborators did not entirely die out. Even after the National School’s absorption into the UFRJ, the academic model persisted—transformed into the modern Brazilian university with its art courses. Neither Modernism and its critiques of the system nor the successive iconoclastic avant-garde movements were able to undermine the universal prestige associated with training in a reputable higher education institution, as occurred in Europe. In that region, the old academies underwent a process of renewal and adaptation to new trends, thereby continuing to function as significant art learning centers.

In the 20th century, the activities of other schools derived from this model in various parts of the country, such as Pernambuco, Bahia, São Paulo, and Rio Grande do Sul, were often fundamental in updating or at least organizing the entire art system in their respective regions. This was the case with the influence of the São Paulo academic Ado Malagoli at the Arts Institute of the Federal University of Rio Grande do Sul and with the Rio Grande do Sul state government, revitalizing art education in both instances. Candido Portinari was another example, a graduate of the National School who adopted an intermediary path between avant-garde and tradition, remaining accessible to the masses by creating poignant images with immediate appeal, while also displaying great plastic richness, an original style, and solid craftsmanship, becoming one of the most influential artistic personalities in Brazil in the mid-20th century. He was highly regarded by the federal government, whose ambitious Brazilianist discourse found an appropriate vehicle in the painter’s historical murals and iconic canvases such as Café. Moreover, even though he did not see himself as an academic artist, Portinari always maintained a strong interest in social issues and education, making several appeals to the government to establish new academic courses and support academic institutions, remaining connected to universities and the federal educational project in various ways. Perhaps not coincidentally, he felt inspired to paint his own version of the scene The First Mass in Brazil, a national historical event previously immortalized by the academic Victor Meirelles. Both Malagoli and Portinari illustrate in recent times the great potential of the connection between public authority and art, which can produce eloquent results when efforts and ideals are aligned and not opposed, and when disciplined, cultured, and talented agents are involved. This connection sustained 20th-century Academicism and has always been one of the pillars of the higher art education system since its foundation in the Academies of old Italy centuries ago.

In the contemporary moment, Brazilian artistic education, following numerous fluctuations and uncertainties, and a series of reform attempts that varied in their success throughout the 20th century, has seemingly solidified its foundations. These reform attempts prioritized spontaneity and emotion over technique and reflection. In recent times, the conventional academic perspective that art is not merely a recreational pursuit or an amateur endeavor, but rather a deliberate process of knowledge construction, with its own history and field of study, has been revived. The vast contemporary production of technical literature and theoretical research, as well as the international recognition achieved by many Brazilian artists trained in higher education institutions, also demonstrate the vitality of Brazilian academic institutions, which are in constant renewal to this day. In this sense, much of the most daring and visionary contemporary Brazilian art is, stricto sensu, and acknowledging the inherent differences between eras, entirely academic.

== Image gallery ==
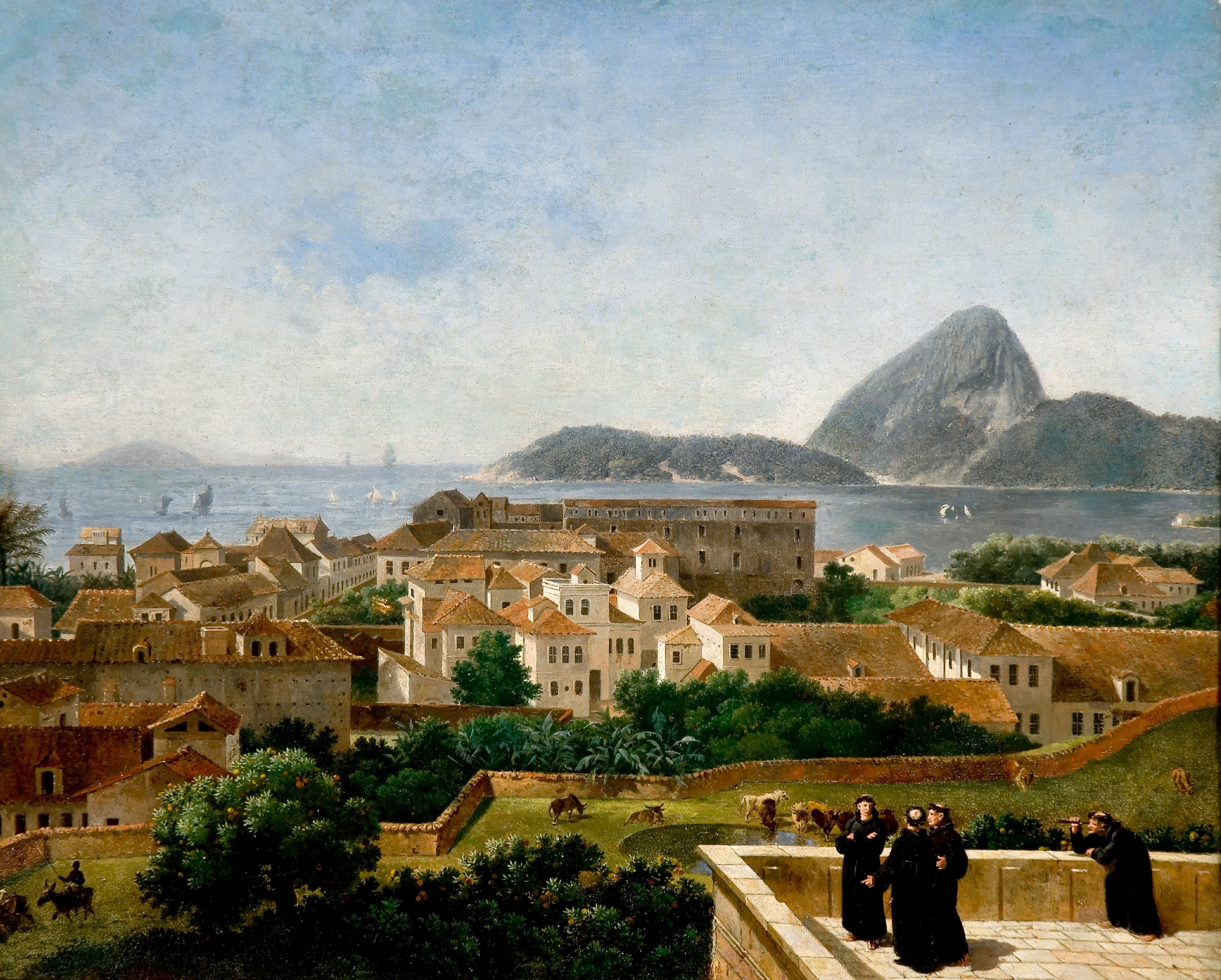
Nicolas-Antoine Taunay: View of Santo Antonio Hill, 1816, MNBA

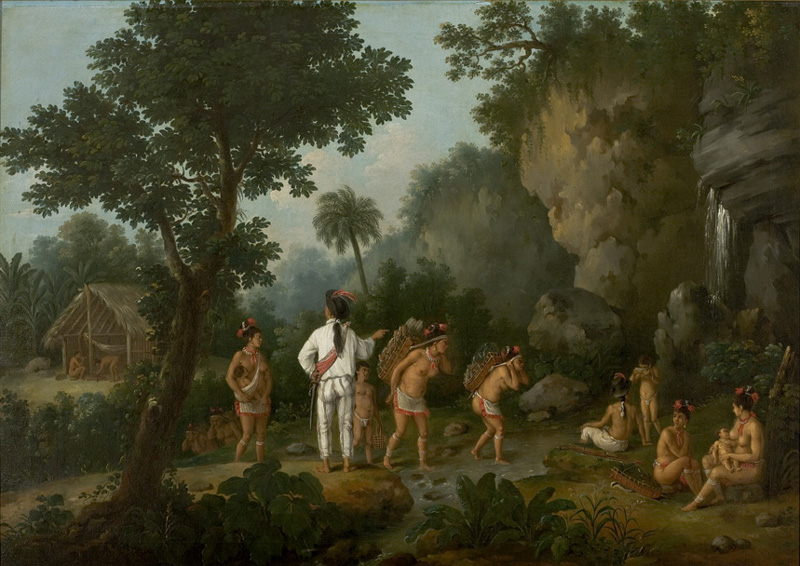
Jean-Baptiste Debret: Slave Hunter, c. 1820, MASP

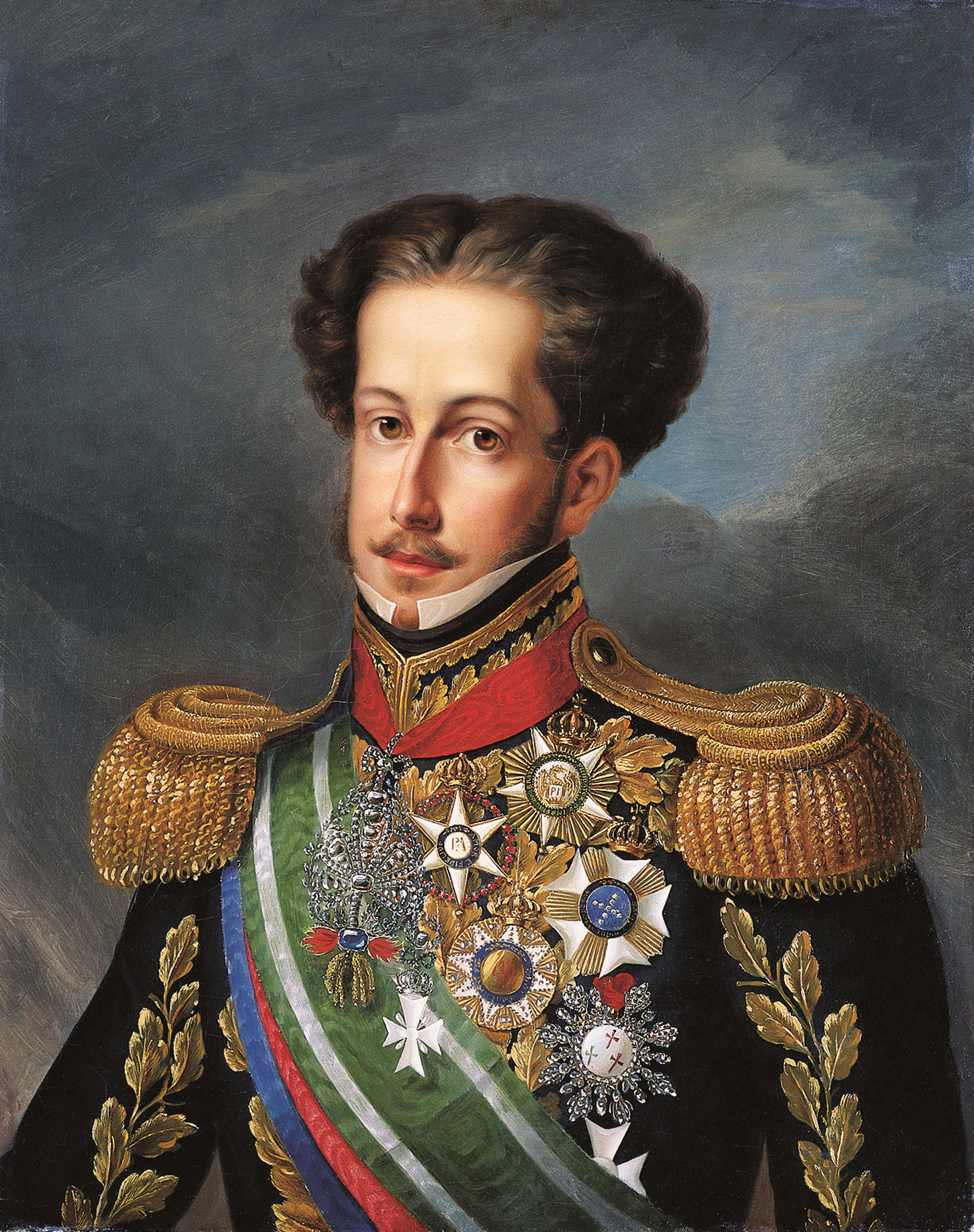
Simplício de Sá: Last Official Portrait of D. Pedro I, 1830, Imperial Museum

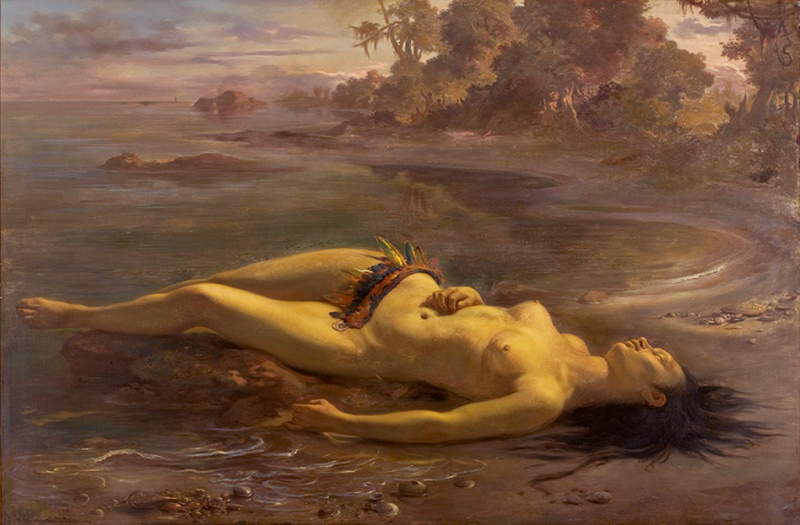
Victor Meirelles: Moema, 1866, MASP
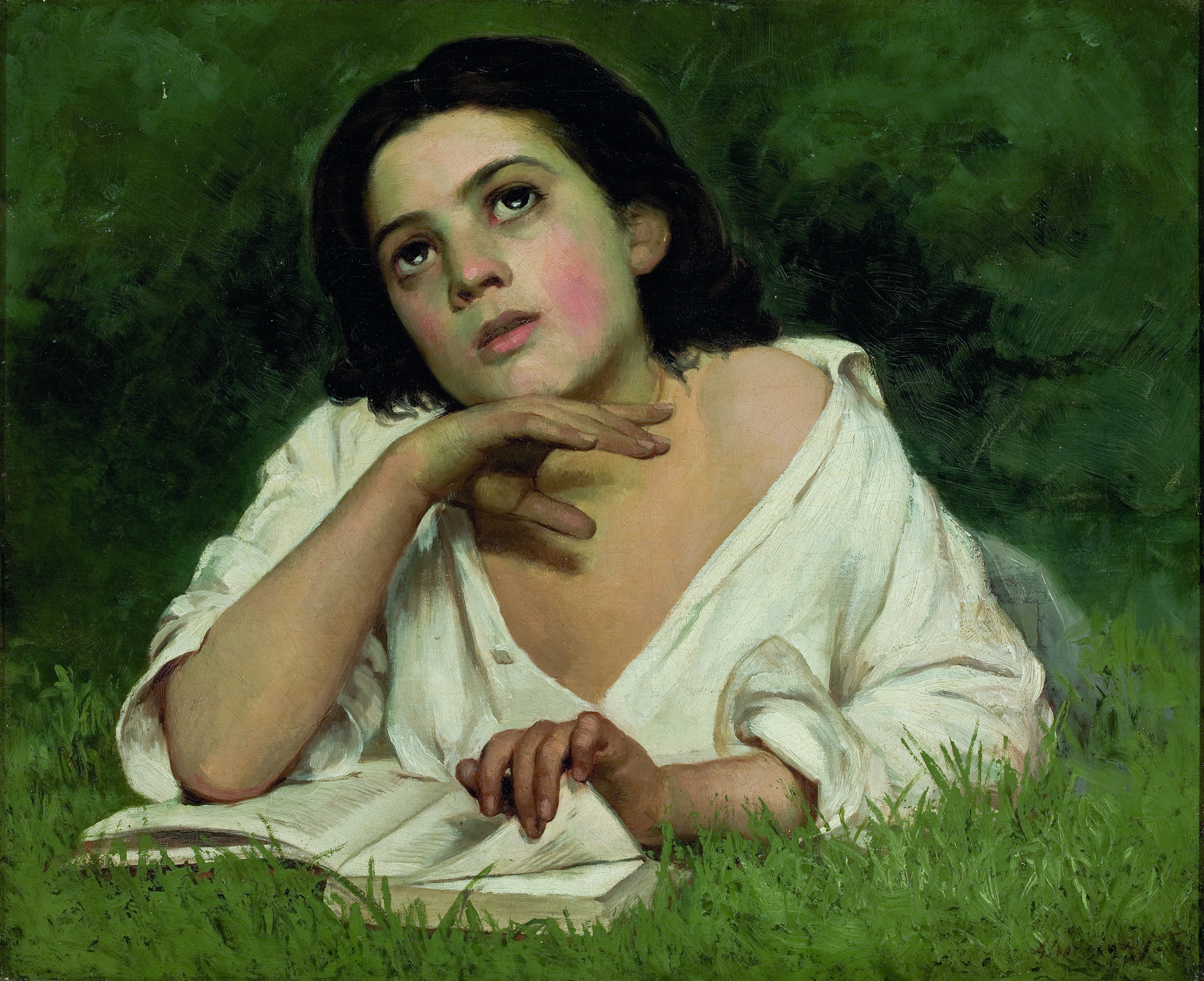
Almeida Júnior: Girl with a Book, MASP

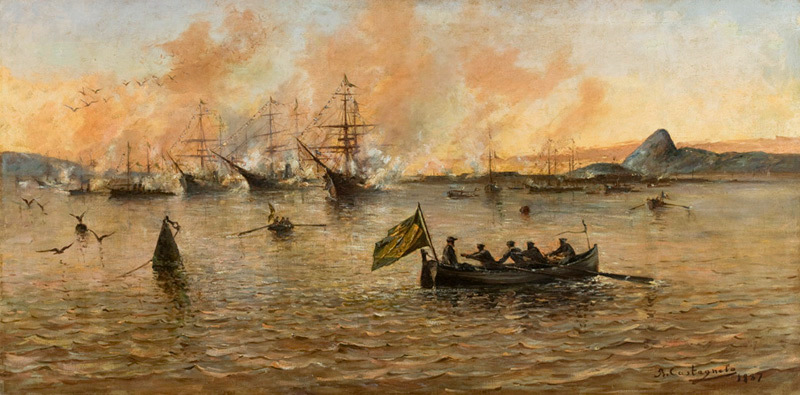
Giovanni Castagneto: Vessels Firing a Salvo in a Day of Great Pomp in Rio de Janeiro Bay, 1887, MASP

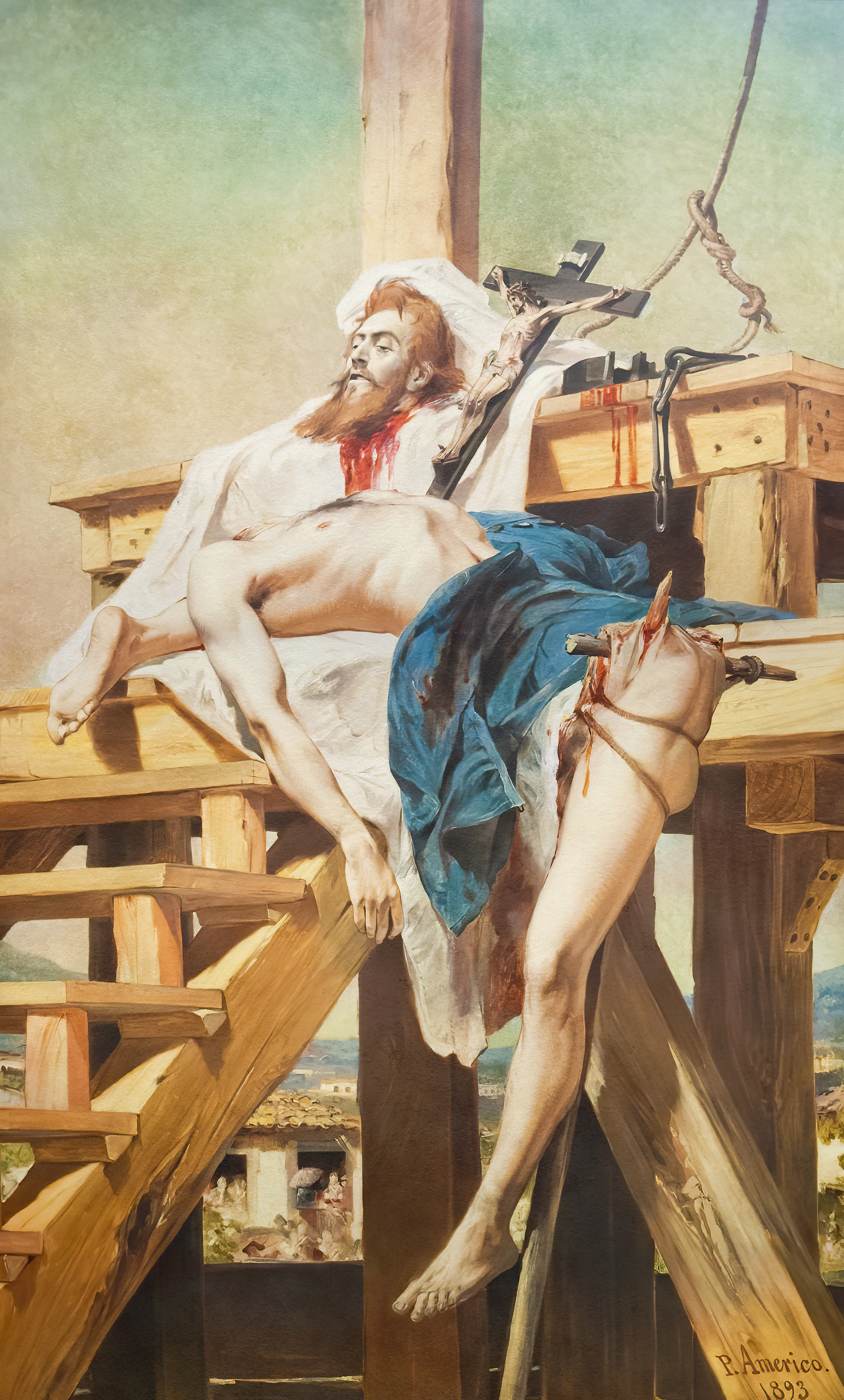
Pedro Américo: Tiradentes Quartered, 1893, Mariano Procópio Museum

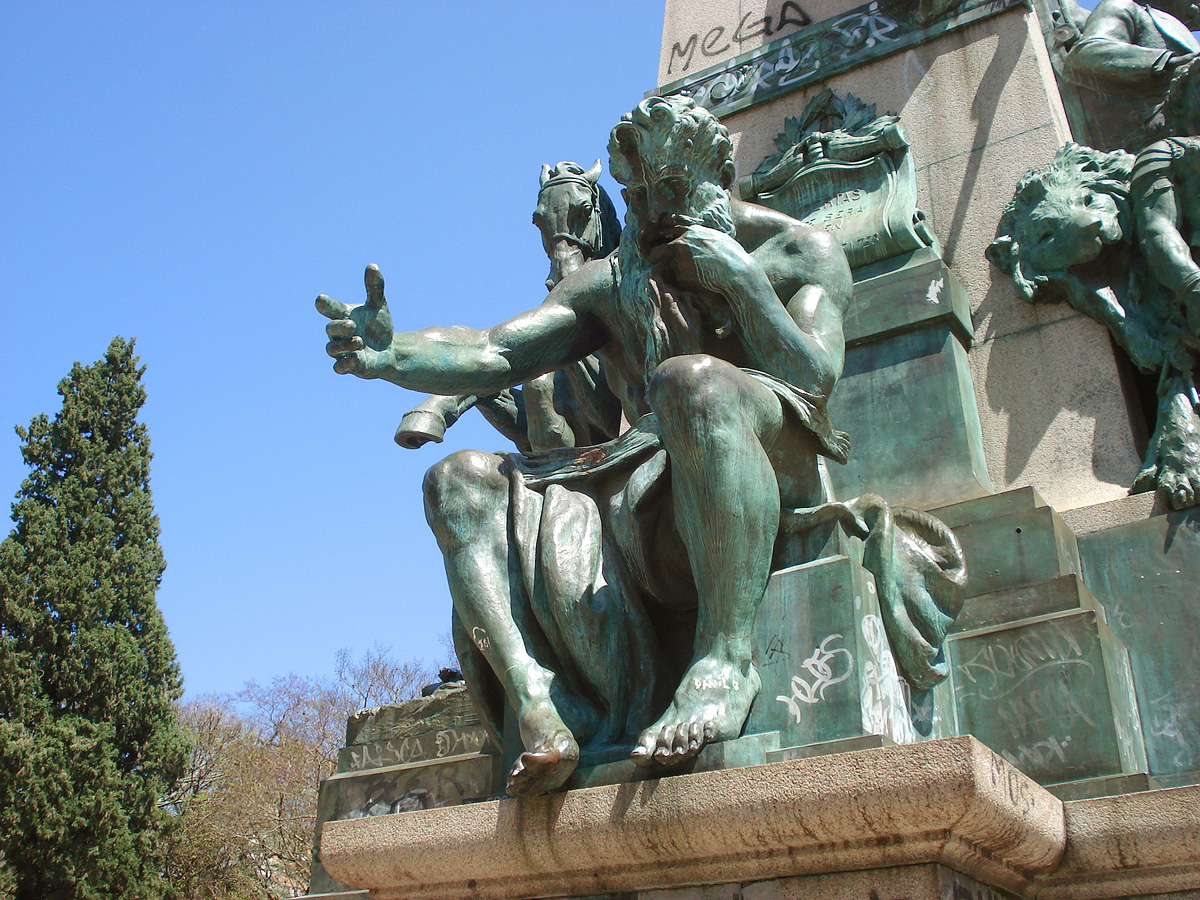
Décio Villares: Júlio de Castilhos Monument, c. 1913, Porto Alegre

== See also ==
- Academy
- Academicism
- Impressionism
- Culture of Brazil
- Art of Brazil
- Education in Brazil
