= Robert Stevenson (musicologist) =

Robert Murrell Stevenson (3 July 1916 in Melrose, New Mexico – 22 December 2012 in Los Angeles) was an American musicologist. He studied at the College of Mines and Metallurgy of the University of Texas at El Paso (BA 1936), the Juilliard School of Music (piano, trombone and composition; graduated 1939), Yale University (MM) and the University of Rochester (PhD in composition 1942); further study took him to Harvard University (STB 1943), Princeton Theological Seminary (ThM 1949) and Oxford University (BLitt 1954). He taught at the University of Texas and at Westminster Choir College in the 1940s. In 1949 he became a faculty member at the University of California at Los Angeles, where he taught until 1987. Stevenson is well known for having studied with Igor Stravinsky when he was young, and for later being a teacher of influential minimalist La Monte Young.

Stevenson was focused on Latin American music, and made it his mission to rediscover the music of New Spain. He contributed significantly to the historical record of Spanish, Portuguese and American music. He wrote extensively on African-American music and the music of the Protestant church within the Americas. In 1978 he became founder-editor of the Inter-American Music Review; now in its thirteenth volume. His works include nearly 30 books, a vast quantity of journal articles, and a large number of encyclopedia entries. He was coordinator of American entries for the Die Musik in Geschichte und Gegenwart supplement and wrote over 300 articles for the New Grove Dictionary of Music and Musicians.

== Works ==
=== Books ===
- Music in Mexico: a historical Survey, New York: Thomas Y. Crowell, 1952 (revised, 1971).
- Patterns of Protestant church music, Duke University Press, 1953.
- La música en la Catedral de Sevilla 1478-1606, Los Angeles, 1954 (Spanish version edited by Sociedad Española de Musicología-SEdeM in 1985).
- Music before the classic era: an introduction guide, Macmillan & Co. Ltd. Editors, 1955.
- Shakespeare´s religious frontier, The Hague: Martinus Nijhoff, 1958.
- Juan Bermudo, The Hague: Martinus Nijhoff, 1960.
- Spanish music in the age of Columbus, The Hague: Martinus Nijhoff, 1958 (revised, 1960).
- The Music of Peru. Aboriginal and Viceroyal Epochs, Pan American Union, Washington, 1959.
- Spanish cathedral music in the Golden Age, University of California Press, 1961 (Spanish version: La música en las catedrales españolas del siglo de oro, translated by María Dolores Cebrián de Miguel and Amalia Correa Liró. Revised by Ismael Fernaández de la Cuesta), Madrid, Alianza Editorial, 1993.
- Music in Aztec (and) Inca Territory, University of California Press, 1961 (revised, 1968).
- Protestant Church Music in America, a short survey of men and movements from 1564 to the present, New York: W.W. Norton & Company, 1966.
- Portuguese music and musicians abroad (to 1650), Lima: Pacific Press, 1966.
- La Música en Quito, Arnahis, editors, 1968.
- Music in El Paso 1919-1939, University of Texas at El Paso, 1970.
- Renaissance and Baroque Musical Sources in the Americas, Washington: General Secretariat, Organization of American States, 1970.
- Foundations of the New World Opera: with a transcription of the earliest extant American opera, 1701, Lima: Pacific Press, 1973. (Spanish version: Torrejón y Velasco, Tomás de, La Purpura de la rosa, estudio preliminar y transcripción de la música, Lima: Instituto Nacional de Cultura, Biblioteca Nacional, 1976).
- Christmas Music from Baroque Mexico, University of California Press, 1974.
- Latin American Colonial Music Anthology, Washington: General Secretariat, Organization of American States, 1975.
- Caribbean Music History a Selective Annotated Bibliography with Musical Supplement, Gemini Graphics editors, 1981.

=== Recording ===
- Justo Sanz and Sebastián Mariné. Robert Stevenson, Obras para Clarinete y piano, Homenaje al compositor, pianista y musicólogo en su 90º aniversario. Real Conservatorio Superior de Música d Madrid, CD-06-II, Madrid, 2005.

== Bibliography ==
- Béhague, Gerard (2001). "Robert M(urrell) Stevenson". In Sadie, Stanley; Tyrrell, John (eds.). The New Grove Dictionary of Music and Musicians (2nd ed.). London: Macmillan Publishers. ISBN 978-1-56159-239-5.
- Susan Campos Fonseca. "Robert Murrell Stevenson’s Music(ethno)logical Enquiry: In Memoriam (1916-2012)." Ethnomusicology Review, Sounding Board (Featured Essays), January 28, 2013.
- Susan Campos Fonseca. "El corpus músico-lógico de Robert Murrell Stevenson (1948-2008)," research work to qualify for the Diploma of Advanced Studies (DEA), directed by Dr. Begoña Lolo, Ph.D. in History and Science of Music, Universidad Autónoma de Madrid (2008), unpublished.
- Susan Campos Fonseca. "Robert Murrell Stevenson desde las reseñas críticas de sus contemporáneos," Revista electrónica de musicología, Vol. XII-Março de 2009, Universidad Federal do Paraná, Brasil, ISSN 1415-952X. http://www.rem.ufpr.br/_REM/REMv12/11/susan_campos_fonseca.htm
- Susan Campos Fonseca. "El legado de Robert Murrell Stevenson en la educación española," OpusMusica 34 (April 2009), ISSN 1885-7450. http://www.opusmusica.com/034/murrell.html
- Susan Campos Fonseca. "Robert M. Stevenson: los inicios de una musicología fronteriza", Música, Real Conservatorio Superior de Música de Madrid, Madrid-2010, pp. 168–188.
- Susan Campos Fonseca. "Robert Murrell Stevenson: Pensamiento músico-lógico y preguntar «músico(etno)lógico» en las Américas", Boletín de Música 25, Casa de las Américas, La Habana-2010, pp. 93–111. http://www.casadelasamericas.com/publicaciones/boletinmusica/actual/revistaboletin.php?pagina=boletin
- Samuel Claro Valdes. "Veinticinco años de la labor iberoamericana del doctor Robert Stevenson." Revista Musical Chilena 139-40 (1977), pp. 122–39.
- Lange F. Curt. "Una nueva revista, un nuevo vocero musicológico de las Américas", Heterofonía, XII/2, 65 (1979), pp. 4–6.
- Ismael Fernández de la Cuesta. "Robert Stevenson: la Sabiduría de la sencillez," Música, Real Conservatorio Superior de Música de Madrid 1 (1994), pp. 12–14.
- Ismael Fernández de la Cuesta. "Biblioteca y Archivo del Profesor Robert Stevenson." Música, Real Conservatorio Superior de Música de Madrid 4-6 (1997–99), p. 105.
- Ismael Fernández de la Cuesta. "Stevenson, Robert Murrell." Diccionario de la Música Española e Hispanoamericana (Madrid: Sociedad General de Autores y Editores, 1999–2002), Vol. 9, pp. 66–70.
- Beatriz Magalhaes-Castro. "Haydn’s Iberian world connections: New perspectives on Robert Stevenson’s contributions to Latin American music studies." Ictus - Periódico do PPGMUS/UFBA, 6 (2005). http://www.ictus.ufba.br/index.php/ictus/article/view/57
- Vasco Mariz. "Robert Stevenson aos 90 anos." Brasiliana 22 (2006), pp. 29 – 30.
- Luis Merino. "Contribución Seminal de Robert Stevenson a la Musicología Histórica del Nuevo Mundo." Revista Musical Chilena XXXIX 164 (1985), pp. 55–79.
- Michael B. O'Connor and Walter Clark, eds. Treasures of the Golden Age: Essays in Honor of Robert M. Stevenson, Hillsdale, NY: Pendragon Press, 2012.
- Soto A. Perez and Miranda P. Perez. "Robert Stevenson y la música mexicana: bibliografía selecta." Heterofonía 114-115 (1996), pp. 64–69
- Silva E. Pulido. "Robert Stevenson, mexicanista." IAMR X/2 (1989), pp. 93–100.
- J. A. Robles Cahero. "Una labor de medio siglo en la investigación musical: entrevista con Robert Stevenson." Heterofonía 114-115 (1996), pp. 48–63.
- Nicholas Slonimsky. "Stevenson, Robert (Murrell)." Baker's Biographical Dictionary of Musicians, ed. Laura Kuhn. New York: Schirmer Books, 2001, pp. 1785–86.
- Robert Stevenson. "STEVENSON Robert (Murrell)." International Who´s Who in Classical Music, 2006, p. 763.
- "El legado de Stevenson, al Conservatorio de Madrid." Ritmo 656 Año LXV (1994), pp. 5, 18–22.
- "A Tribute to Robert M. Stevenson" (Third Annual Study Session of the International Hispanic Music Study Group, American Musicological Society, 1995). IHMSG Newsletter 2/2 (1996). http://www.dartmouth.edu/~hispanic/v2n2.html
- "Catálogo de las composiciones de Robert Stevenson en la Biblioteca del Real Conservatorio Superior de Música de Madrid." Música, Real Conservatorio Superior de Música de Madrid 7-9 (2000–2002), pp. 187–253.
- "Robert Stevenson." AMS Newsletter 32/1 (2002), pp. 6–7.
