= Vasco Mariz =

Brazilian writer and diplomat (1921–2017)

- Born: January 22, 1921; Rio de Janeiro, Brazil
- Died: June 16, 2017 (aged 96); Rio de Janeiro, Brazil
- Education: Brazilian Conservatory of Music

Vasco Mariz (Rio de Janeiro, January 22, 1921 — June 16, 2017) was a Brazilian historian, musicologist, writer and diplomat.

== Biography ==
He received his musical training at the Brazilian Conservatory of Music and graduated in law from the Federal University of Rio de Janeiro in 1943, and two years later he began his diplomatic career. Completing a further course in Diplomatic History in 1947, he was soon appointed vice-consul in Porto, later serving in various roles and positions in Rosario, Naples, Washington, D.C., New York City, Rome, until reaching the rank of minister in 1967, promoted by merit, and ambassador in 1971, appointed to represent Brazil in Ecuador and successively in Israel, Peru and East Germany, retiring in 1987.

In his career as a diplomat, before becoming ambassador, he played the role of Brazilian delegate to several important international organizations – such as the UN, FAO, the OAS, GATT, UNESCO – and on several occasions such representations had clear cultural purposes, developing in the area of history, folklore, art and music. He was head of the cultural department at Itamaraty Palace.

He was a member emeritus of the Brazilian Historic and Geographic Institute, the PEN CLUB do Brasil and the Brazilian Academy of Music (president in 1991), member of the Technical Council of the National Confederation of Commerce and other national and foreign institutions such as the Inter-American Musician (former president). He was also an advisor to the National Museum of Fine Arts.

He died at the age of 96 at the Hospital Samaritano in Rio de Janeiro from pneumonia.

== Published books ==
Until 2010, Vasco published 58 books, including nine outside of Brazil: two in the United States and one in France, the Soviet Union, Italy, Portugal, Argentina, Peru and Colombia, including:

- A canção de câmara no Brasil (6th edition, 2002)
- Heitor Villa-Lobos, o homem e a obra (12th edition, 2004), published in Brazil and the U.S., France, Soviet Union, Italy and Colombia
- Dicionário Biográfico Musical (3rd edition, 1991)
- A canção popular brasileira (7th edition, 2002)
- História da Música no Brasil (8th edition, 2012)
- Três Musicólogos Brasileiros (1983), written about Mário de Andrade, Renato Almeida and Luiz Heitor Corrêa de Azevedo
- Cláudio Santoro (1994)
- Antônio Houaiss, uma vida (organiser, 1995)
- Francisco Mignone: O homem e a Obra (organiser, 1997)
- 1,500 entries for the Grande Dicionário da Língua Portuguesa, by Antonio Houaiss (1998)
- Música clássica brasileira (2002)
- Ribeiro Couto, 30 anos de saudade (organiser, 1991)
- Ribeiro Couto – Maricota, Baianinha e outras mulheres (anthology, organiser, 2001)
- Ribeiro Couto no seu centenário (1998)
- Villegagnon e a França Antártica (1999, 2002, 2005, co-authored by Lucien Provençal)
- Vida musical (4th series, 1997)
- Mini-enciclopédia internacional – Dicionário Carlos Aulete Essencial (2009)
- Ensaios históricos (2004)
- Brasil/França – relações históricas no período colonial (organiser, 2006)
- Os Franceses no Maranhão: La Ravardière e a França Equinocial (co-authored by Lucien Provençal, 2007 & 2011)
- A música no Rio de Janeiro no tempo de D.João VI (2008)
- Temas da política internacional (memoir, 2008)
- Cartas de Villegagnon e textos correlatos (organization and footnotes, 2009)
- Depois da Glória (2012)
- Nos bastidores da diplomacia (2013)
- Os franceses na Guanabara (2015)
- Pelos caminhos da história (2015)
- Ribeiro Couto: 50 anos de saudades (2015)
- Retratos do Império (2016)
- Retratos da Republica (2017)

== Distinções ==
- Prêmio José Veríssimo of the Academia Brasileira de Letras (1983)
- Tribute to Vasco Mariz, article by Robert Stevenson in music magazine Inter-American Music Review, Los Angeles, (volume 13, No. 2)
- Grande Prêmio da Crítica (2000) of the Associação Paulista dos Críticos de Arte (APCA), for his work in musicology.
- Prêmio Clio de História da Academia Paulista de História (2007)
- Personalidade Musical de 2009 concedido pela Associação Paulista de Críticos de Arte (APCA)
- Prêmio Ars Latina, of Romania (2010)
- The PEN Clube do Brasil awarded his book After Glory the award for best of the year in the Essays category (2013)
- Elected to the Academia Carioca de Letras (2016)
