= Zepherin Ferrez =

French-Brazilian artist

Zéphyrin Ferrez
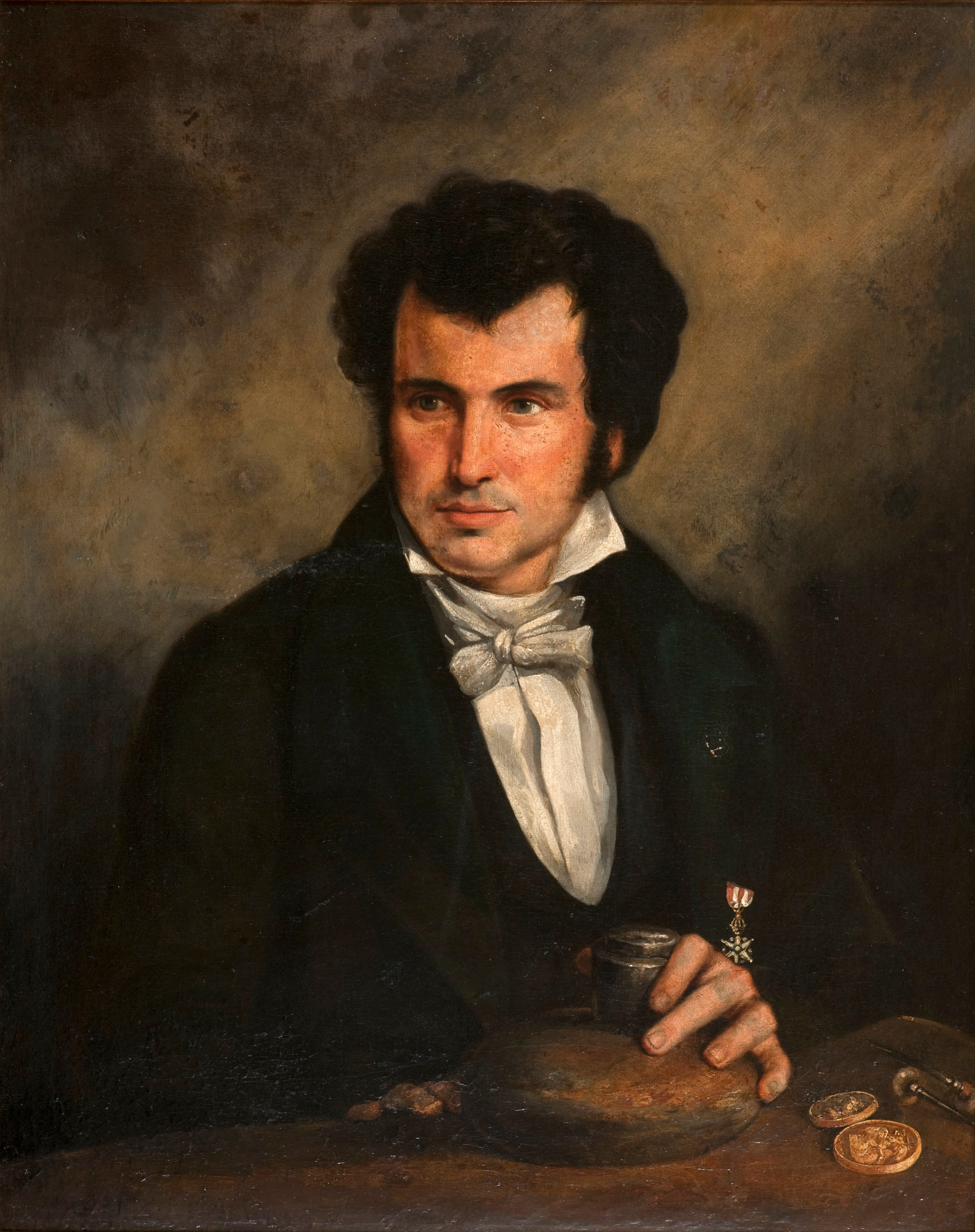
- Portrait by Augusto Müller, 1830s
- Born: 31 July 1797; Saint-Laurent, France
- Died: 22 July 1851 (aged 53); Rio de Janeiro, Brazil
- Occupations: Sculptor and engraver

Zéphyrin Ferrez (or Zepherin Ferrez; 31 July 1797 – 22 July 1851) was a French sculptor and engraver who spent much of his career in Rio de Janeiro, Brazil. He is the Patron of the 7th chair of the Brazilian Academy of Fine Arts.

== Early years ==
Zepherin Ferrez was born in Saint-Laurent, France in 1797. In 1810 he began his training in printmaking and sculpture in Paris with Philippe-Laurent Roland (1746–1816) and Pierre-Nicolas Beauvallet (1750–1818).

== Career ==
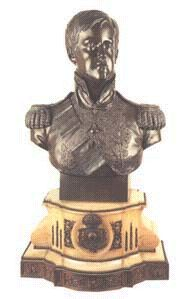
Pedro II of Brazil by Ferrez (1839)

Zéphyrin Ferrez was a member of the Missão Artística Francesa (French Artistic Mission) organized by Joachim Lebreton which brought a group of artists to Brazil, arriving on 25 March 1816. These included his brother, the sculptor Marc Ferrez (1788–1850), the painter Jean-Baptiste Debret (1768–1848), the sculptor Auguste Marie Taunay and his brother the painter Nicolas Antoine Taunay (1755–1830), the engraver Charles-Simon Pradier (1786–1847) and the architect Auguste-Henri-Victor Grandjean de Montigny (1776–1850). They were to form the nucleus of a royal art academy in Brazil.

The arrival of the French group caused some controversy among the local Portuguese intelligentsia, who were concerned at the excessive influence being given to the French in developing the cultural life of Brazil. In turn, the French were unhappy with political appointments such as the appointment of Henrique José da Silva as head of the school in place of Lebreton. This was the reason why Tauney's brother, Nicolas Antoine Taunay, returned to France.

In 1817 Zéphyrin Ferrez worked with Auguste Marie Taunay, Debret and Grandjean de Montigny on decorating Rio de Janeiro for the festivities surrounding the arrival of the Princess Maria Leopoldina of Austria (1797–1826). Zéphyrin and Marc Ferrez sculpted and decorated the bassinet offered to Pedro I of Brazil (1798–1834) on the occasion of the birth of his first daughter, Princess Maria da Glória. Based on this work he was admitted to the artistic circle of the Imperial Academy of Fine Arts (Brazil). In 1820 he engraved the Senatus Fluminense medal in honor of the acclamation of King John VI of Portugal, who had been enthroned in 1818. That year he obtained a permanent position as professor on medal engraving at the Academy. In 1826 the brothers Ferrez made a set of bas-reliefs and clay sculptures for the facade of the Academy building.

Zéphyrin Ferrez died in Rio de Janeiro in 1851. His son, Marc Ferrez (1843–1923), became a well-known photographer.

== Work ==
Zéphyrin Ferrez undertook various works with his brother Marc Ferrez, including decorating the facade of the Academy building. This included the bas-reliefs of Phébé on her chair of light and the Genius of Art. He sculpted the scrolls and Ionic capitals of the entrance to the Academy, now in the Botanical Garden. Ferroz was one of the first medal engravers in Brazil, and made various medals commemorating events in the country. As a sculptor he made two bronze busts of Pedro II, and a bronze statue of Pedro I. His students included Manuel de Lima, Chaves Pinheiro (1822–1884) and José da Silva Santos.
