= Marc Ferrez (sculptor) =

French sculptor and engraver

- Born: 14 October 1788; Saint-Claude, France
- Died: 1 April 1850 (aged 61); Rio de Janeiro, Brazil
- Occupation: Sculptor
- Known for: Bust of Pedro I of Brazil (1826)

Marc Ferrez (14 October 1788 – 1 April 1850) was a French sculptor and engraver who spent a large part of his career in Rio de Janeiro, Brazil.

== Early years ==
Marc Ferrez was born on 14 October 1788 in Saint-Laurent, in the arrondissement of Saint-Claude, Jura, France. He was the eldest of three brothers born in that town. Auguste Ferrez was born in 1795 and Zéphirin Ferrez in 1797. Their parents were a carpenter and a seamstress. In 1809 he entered the École des Beaux-Arts in Paris where he studied under the sculptor Philippe-Laurent Roland (1746–1816) and the engraver Pierre-Nicolas Beauvallet (1750–1818). His brother Zepherin Ferrez (1797–1851) was also a sculptor and engraver, and also studied at the École des Beaux-Arts. The two brothers spent six months in New York City in 1816–17.

== Brazil ==
In 1817 the Ferrez brothers moved to Rio de Janeiro where they joined the Missão Artística Francesa (French Artistic Mission) organized by Joachim Lebreton. Lebreton had brought a group of artists to Brazil, arriving on 25 March 1816. These included the painter Jean-Baptiste Debret (1768–1848), the sculptor Auguste Marie Taunay (1768–1824) and his brother the painter Nicolas Antoine Taunay (1755–1830), the engraver Charles-Simon Pradier (1786–1847)) and the architect Auguste-Henri-Victor Grandjean de Montigny (1776–1850). They were to form the nucleus of a royal art academy in Brazil.

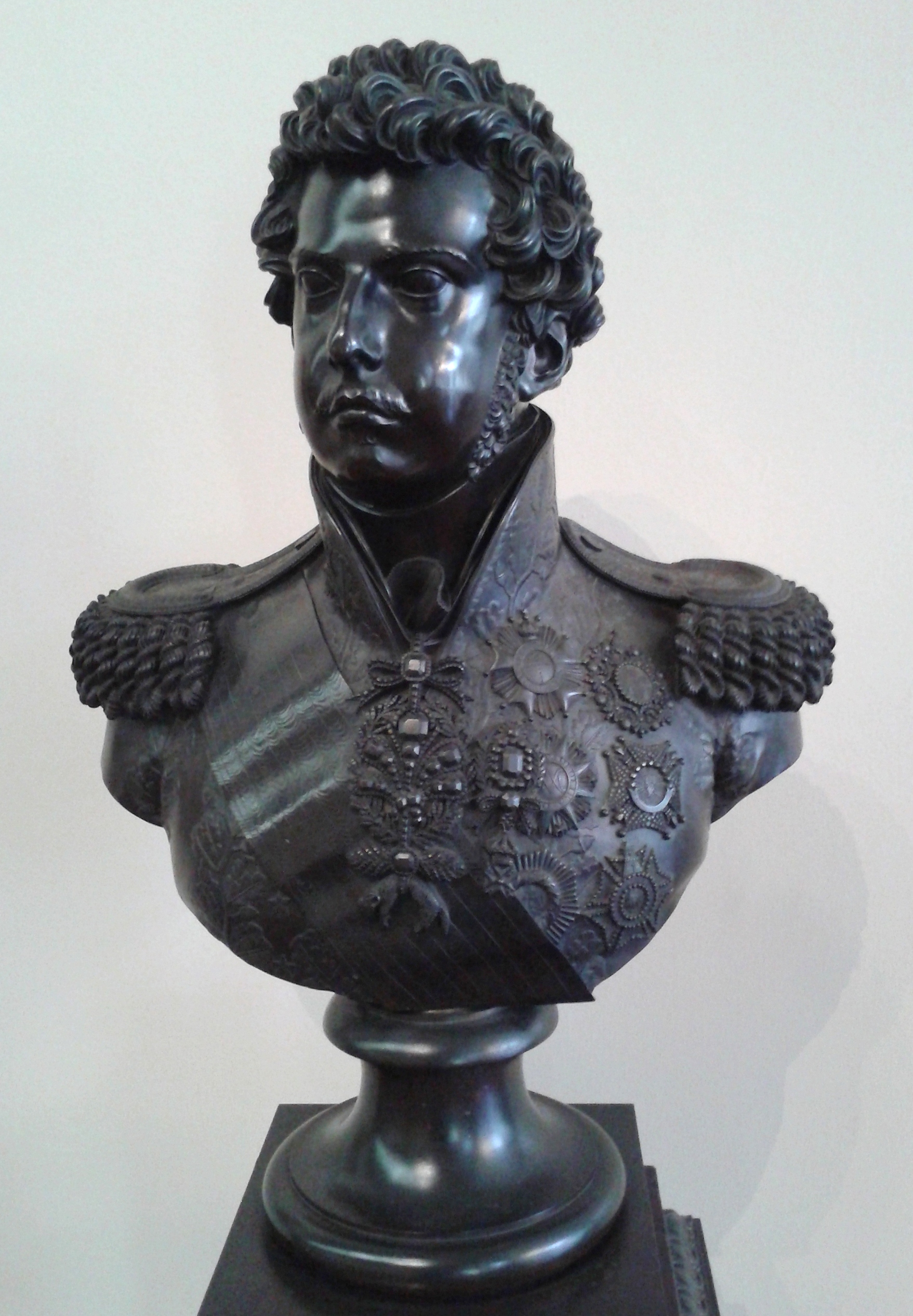
Bust of Pedro I of Brazil (original by Marc Ferrez).

The Ferrez brothers worked with Auguste Marie Taunay, Debret and the architect Grandjean de Montigny on the decorations for the monuments erected on the occasion of the arrival of Princess Maria Leopoldina of Austria (1797–1826) and her marriage with the Emperor Pedro I of Brazil (1798–1834). In 1820 Marc Ferrez was appointed a permanent lecturer at the Imperial Academy of Fine Arts. After Auguste–Marie Taunay died in 1824, Marc Ferrez became deputy professor of sculpture. When Joaquim Alão died in 1837, he became full professor. In 1842 Marc Ferrez made the sculptural decorations of the rooms of Dona Teresa Cristina on the frigate Constitution, which brought her to Brazil.

Marc Ferrez died in Rio de Janeiro on 1 April 1850, aged 61. Francisco Manuel Chaves Pinheiro (1822–1884) was one of his best-known pupils. His nephew, Zepherin's son, also called Marc Ferrez, became a celebrated photographer.

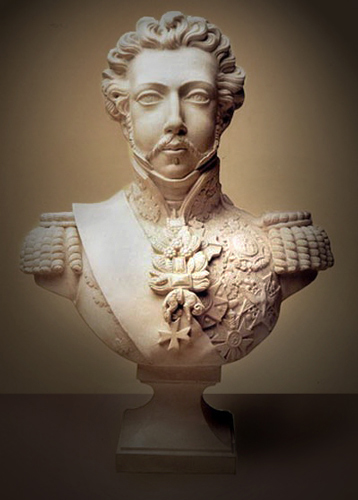
Bust of Pedro I of Brazil, by an unknown sculptor after the original by Marc Ferrez

== Work ==
Marc Ferrez made copies of antiques, monumental decorations and classical busts. His copies of statues and plaster bas reliefs were not exceptional but were skillfully executed. Typically they were made from classical Greek models. Most of his monumental work in terracotta has been destroyed, broken while being moved from one place to another. He is now best known for his highly realistic and technically excellent busts. Due to the absence of marble and high price of bronze, he made almost all his portraits in plaster and painted them to give the illusion of metal. The only known bronze bust is one of Pedro I (1826).

Some of his works included:

- A sculpted wood cradle created with his brother, offered to the Emperor Pedro I when the princess Maria da Glória was born in 1818.
- Statues of Apollo and Minerva for the facade of the Academy
- Bust of Pedro I of Brazil (1826)
- Bust of a Lady of the First Reign (1829)
- Bust of Martim Francisco Ribeiro de Andrada (1829)
- Bust of José Bonifácio de Andrada (1839)

== Sources ==
- Boghici, Jean (1990). "MARC FERREZ". Mission artistique française et les peintres voyageurs. Instituto Cultural Brasil-Franc̜a : Fundac̜ão Casa Franc̜a-Brasil, Secretaria de Cultura do Estado do Rio de Janeiro.
- Bruand, Yves (1974). "Fondation de l'enseignement académique et néo-classicisme au Brésil : Marc et Zéphirin Ferrez, sculpteurs français fixés à Rio de Janeiro". Cahiers du monde hispanique et luso-brésilien. 23 (23): 101–120. doi:10.3406/carav.1974.1952.
- Ferrez, Marc (1788–1850). 26 September 2013. ISBN 978-85-85291-50-1.
- Franco, Afonso Arinos de Melo (1975). O Palacete Do Caminho Novo: Solar Da Marquesa de Santos. Fontana.
- Gesualdo, Vicente (1990). Historia de la Fotografía en América: Desde Alaska Hasta Tierra Del Fuego en el Siglo XIX. Editorial Sui Generis. ISBN 978-950-740-000-1.
- Instituto Moreira Salles (2005). O Brasil de Marc Ferrez. Instituto Moreira Salles. ISBN 978-85-86707-13-1.
- Turner, Jane (2000). Encyclopedia of Latin American and Caribbean Art. Macmillan Reference. ISBN 978-0-333-76466-4.
- Williams, Daryle (2001-07-12). Culture Wars in Brazil: The First Vargas Regime, 1930–1945. Duke University Press. ISBN 0-8223-2719-8.
