= Marc Ferrez =

Marc Ferrez may refer to:

- Marc Ferrez (photographer) (1843–1923), son of Zéphyrin Ferrez
- Marc Ferrez (sculptor) (1788–1850), sculptor, brother of Zéphyrin Ferrez
