= Taunay =

Taunay is a surname. Notable people with the surname include:

- Adrien Taunay the Younger (1803–1828), French painter and draftsman
- Afonso d'Escragnolle Taunay (1876–1958), Brazilian writer, politician and noble
- Alfredo d'Escragnolle Taunay, Viscount of Taunay (1843–1899), Brazilian writer, musician, military engineer, historian, politician, etc.
- Auguste Marie Taunay (1768–1824), French sculptor
- Félix Taunay, Baron of Taunay (1795–1881), French Brazilian painter
- Nicolas-Antoine Taunay (1755–1830), French painter
