= Charles-Simon Pradier =

Swiss engraver (1783–1847)

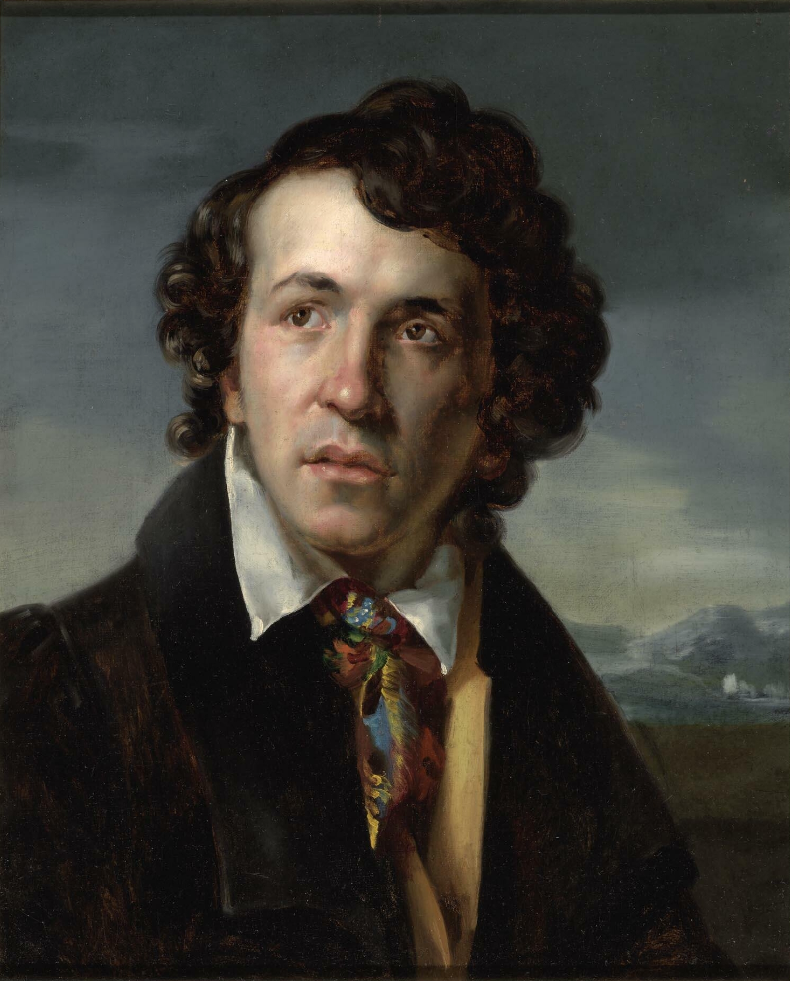
Portrait at the Bibliothèque de Genève

Charles-Simon Pradier (25 May 1783 – 21 July 1847) was a Swiss engraver who also worked in France and Brazil. He was recognized as one of the leading engravers of his day. He collaborated with Jean Auguste Dominique Ingres on several works.

== Life ==
Pradier was born on 25 May 1783 in Geneva, in the Republic of Geneva, into a family descended from Huguenot refugees from the Languedoc. His brother was the sculptor Jean-Jacques Pradier (1790–1852), better known as James Pradier. Pradier was a pupil of Auguste Gaspard Louis Desnoyers, who was in turn a pupil of Pierre Alexandre Tardieu (1756–1844). He was to become one of the most distinguished engravers of his day. Pradier became a member of the Drawing Committee of the Société des Arts in 1812, but was not active in it since he usually lived in Geneva.

Pradier was a member of the Missão Artística Francesa organized by Joachim Lebreton which brought a number of artists to Brazil, arriving on 25 March 1816. These included the painters Jean-Baptiste Debret (1768–1848) and Nicolas-Antoine Taunay (1755–1830), the sculptor Auguste Marie Taunay (1768–1824), the brothers Marc Ferrez (1788–1850) and Zepherin Ferrez (1797–1851) and the architect Grandjean de Montigny (1776–1850). They were to form the nucleus of a royal art academy in Brazil. Pradier left Brazil in 1818 and returned to Paris. He claimed that in Brazil there was no appropriate paper for printing his works.

In 1825 Jean-Auguste-Dominique Ingres gave Pradier permission to make a print of his painting of Virgil reading the Aeneid to the Emperor Augustus. Ingres introduced changes, and made a drawing in 1830 that seems to have been the version copied by Pradier. Pradier won the cross of the Legion of Honour for this engraving. Later Ingres created a smaller version of his Antiochus and Stratonice for engraving by Pradier, but the project was eventually abandoned.

Pradier returned to Geneva in 1847 in failing health. He died at nearby Mornex on 21 July 1847. Pradier's last work was Jesus giving the keys to Saint Peter, after a painting by Ingres, on which he worked for seven years. The engraving was exhibited in Geneva in August 1847.

== Works ==
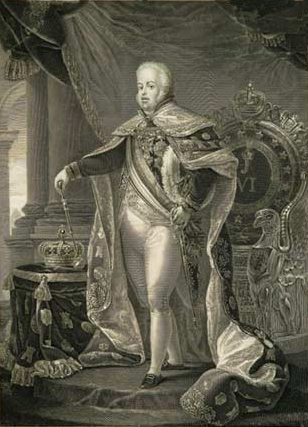
João VI of Portugal (c. 1816)

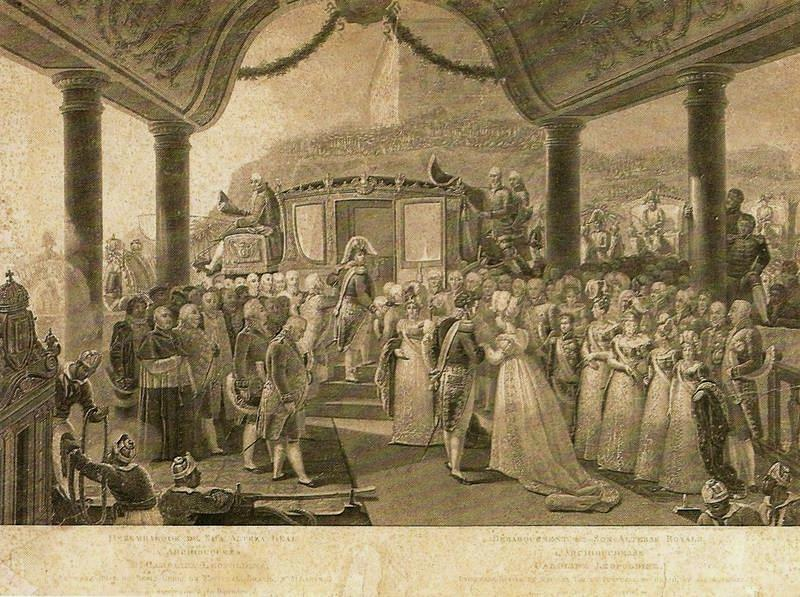
Disembarkation of her royal highness, the archduchess Carolina Leopoldina (1818)

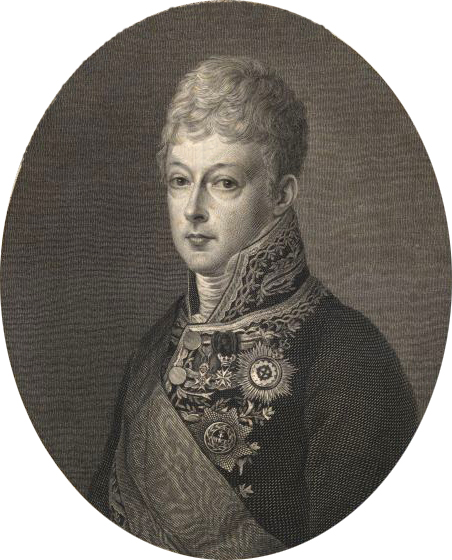
Pedro José Joaquim Vito de Meneses Coutinho, 6th marquês de Marialva (1819)

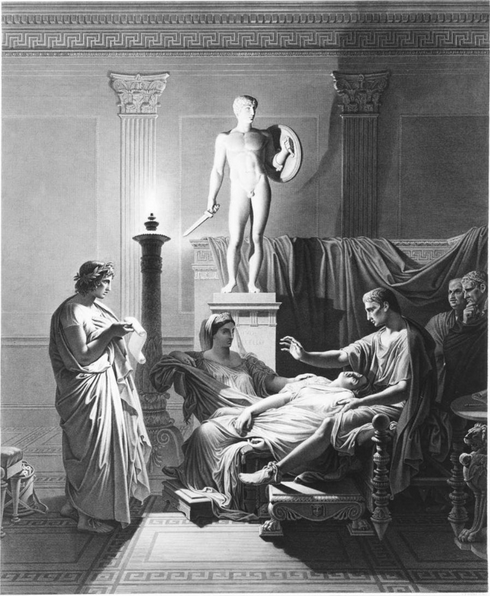
Virgil Reading the Aeneid to Augustus (1832: after Ingres)

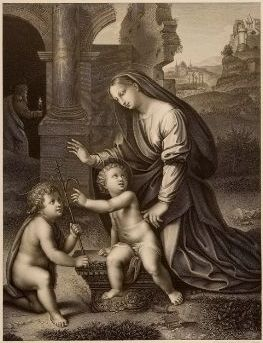
La Vierge aux ruines (after Raphael)

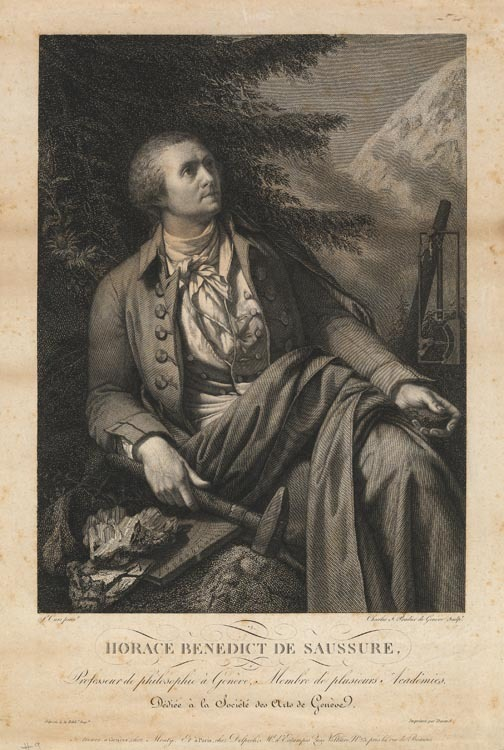
Horace-Bénédict de Saussure (after Jean-Pierre Saint-Ours)
