= Missão Artística Francesa =

1816 French artistic mission sent to Brazil

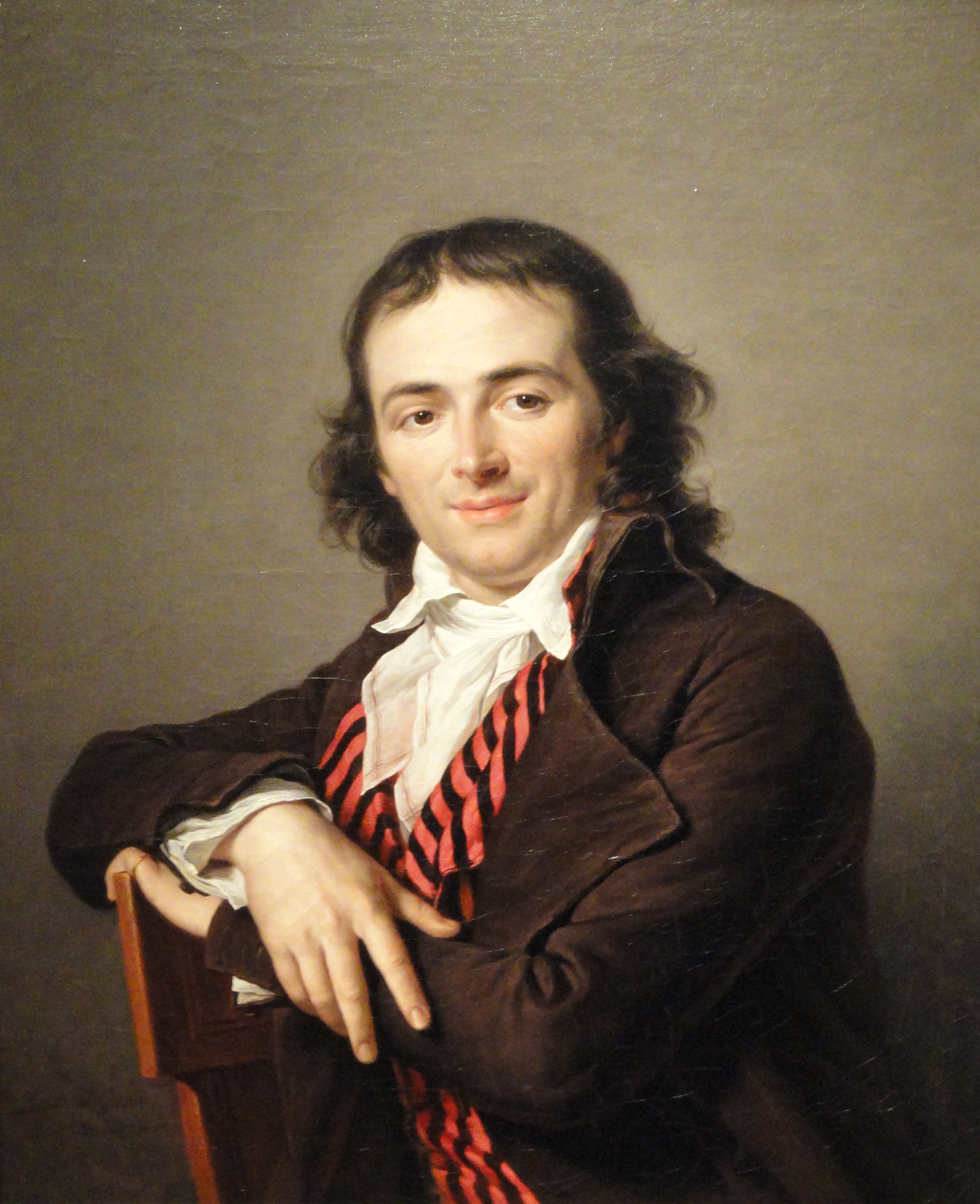
Joachim Lebreton, by Adélaïde Labille-Guiard

The French Artistic Mission in Brazil (Portuguese: Missão Artística Francesa; French: Mission artistique française) was a group of French artists, artisans, and architects who arrived in Rio de Janeiro, then the capital of the United Kingdom of Portugal, Brazil and the Algarves, in March 1816. The group was led by the public administrator Joachim Lebreton and funded by Dom João VI following the fall of Napoleon and a period of intense political instability in France. The Mission sought to modernize artistic production and education in Brazil by introducing modern European art principles and academic training. It led to the creation of the Royal School of Sciences, Arts and Crafts, the first of its kind in Latin America and the Portuguese colonial world, and a key to the development of Brazilian artists and artistic production. The French Mission is also associated with the strengthening of the Neoclassicism movement in Brazil.

The Mission included French artistic figures such as Jean-Baptiste Debret, Nicolas Antoine Taunay, Auguste Marie Taunay, Marc Ferrez, the architect Grandjean de Montigny, François Ovide, among others. Their work was slow to bear fruit. The Mission encountered resistance from artists and patrons firmly rooted in the Baroque tradition; faced a scarcity of financial resources and a series of political intrigues which ultimately dissolved much of the initial enthusiasm for the project.

== Origin ==
The French Mission was led by Joachim Lebreton, a French political administrator, and was funded by the government of Dom João VI. The Mission was formed during the political reorganization of France under the Bourbon Restoration. It attracted artists associated with the deposed Napoleon Bonaparte who no longer felt secure in France.

The precise circumstances surrounding the invitation of the group remain debated by historians. Some scholars attribute the initiative to the Marquis of Marialva, allegedly acting on the recommendation of the German naturalist Alexander von Humboldt, with the invitation ratified by the Portuguese Minister of Foreign Affairs, António de Araújo de Azevedo (1754–1817), the first Count of Barca. Azevedo acted via Francisco José Maria de Brito (1760–1825), the Portuguese chargé d’affaires in Paris. Brito received Joachim Lebreton, maintaining correspondence with him throughout 1815 about the project. Brito personally financed part of the journey with a substantial sum, rather than with money from the Portuguese Crown.

Others historians emphasize a letter from Nicolas-Antoine Taunay to the queen of Portugal, in which he appealed for assistance and requested that the Prince Regent authorize the entire group to relocate, citing their precarious position in post-Napoleonic France and the political climate surrounding the Congress of Vienna. The group, sometimes referred to as the Colônia Lebreton, was escorted to Brazil aboard English ships, and arrived in Brazil in March 26, 1816.

The mission, at the time of its inception, was not known as the French Mission. Afonso d’Escragnolle Taunay’s outlined the concept of the “Mission artistique française de 1816” as an official, state-sponsored undertaking in 1912. Araújo Viana popularized the term Mission française between 1915 and 1916. The Instituto Histórico e Geográfico Brasileiro organized a centenary celebration of the Mission in 1916, and formalized the term and concept of the French Mission in Brazil.

== Objectives ==
Artists working in Brazil in the colonial period largely specialized in religious subjects. The Mission aimed to reorganize and modernize artistic production and education in Brazil by introducing the European academic system of higher artistic instruction. Its central objective was the establishment of a formal institution for the teaching of the fine arts, which resulted in the creation of the Escola Real de Ciências, Artes e Ofícios (Royal School of Sciences, Arts and Crafts), later known as the National School of Fine Arts.^{A} This model of instruction, developed in Europe since the 17th century, did not exist either in Brazil or in metropolitan Portugal prior to the Mission’s arrival. The school was the first of its kind in both the Portuguese colonial world and Latin America.

The artists and artisans of the Mission played a decisive role in introducing and consolidating Neoclassicism in Brazil, transforming the local artistic landscape and stimulating the development of academic art. Their work marked a rupture with the long-established Baroque tradition, which remained deeply rooted and initially resistant to the new aesthetic principles. Progress was further hindered by financial limitations and political intrigue, which dampened the early enthusiasm surrounding the project and delayed its full realization.

=== Imperial period ===
During the Imperial period in Brazil, the Mission proved fundamental in shaping the country’s emerging artistic identity. In 1826, the Academy of Fine Arts was formally established, dedicated to the teaching of architecture, sculpture, and painting through academic methods rather than traditional apprenticeships. These institutions trained the first generation of Brazilian academic artists and permanently transformed artistic education in the country. Prior to their establishment, Brazilian artists commonly traveled to Europe for training; the Mission’s legacy lay in creating a local system capable of fostering distinctive Brazilian artistic practices within an academic framework. The Artistic Mission additionally brought about a generation of artists that came to depict a crucial period of change in Brazil. Through faltering monarchies, developing empires, racial hierarchy, and a complex history of slavery, the corresponding growth of the arts allowed a window into Brazil’s rich history. In the 20th century, the French Artistic Mission had continued in São Paulo to the foundation of the University of São Paulo.

== Noted artists ==
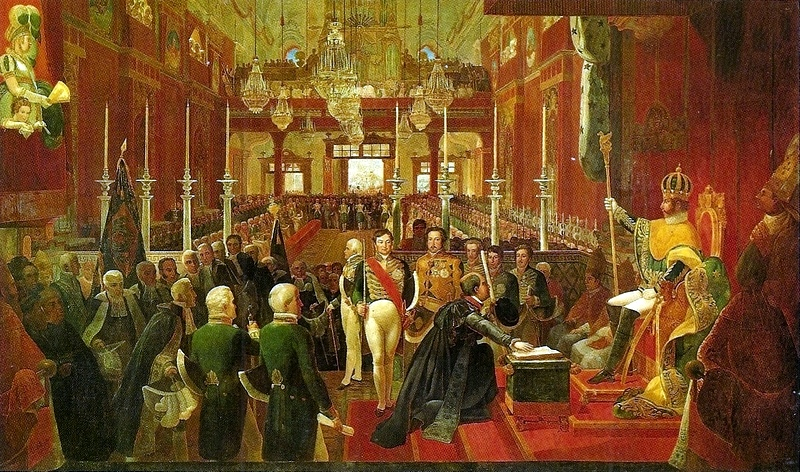
Figure 1

The Mission was formed by the following artists:

- Jean-Baptiste Debret, painter
- Nicolas Antoine Taunay, painter
- Auguste Marie Taunay, sculptor
- Marc Ferrez, sculptor
- Zéphirin Ferrez, sculptor
- Charles-Simon Pradier, Swiss engraver
- Grandjean de Montigny, architect
- François Ovide, engineer

=== Jean-Baptiste Debret ===
With the support of the Count of Barca, this group of Napoleonic artists arrived in Brazil following the exile of Napoleon Bonaparte and their subsequent loss of prestige. With them, came the introduction of the neoclassical movement, which draws inspiration from classical antiquity. At the forefront of the group was painter Jean-Baptiste Debret. Debret worked closely with the Royal Court, completing many portraits for them throughout his time in Brazil, the most notable being Coroação de D. Pedro I (figure 1). In addition to his grand paintings of the Royal Court, Debret commonly depicted day to day life in Brazil through his watercolors. The juxtaposing depictions of ornate, detailed imperial life and simplistic renderings of enslaved peoples highlights the harsh realities of slavery and racial hierarchy in Brazil.

=== Nicolas Antoine Taunay ===
Nicolas Antoine Taunay was another prominent leader in Brazil’s artistic formation that worked closely with Debret and the rest of the French Artistic Mission. Taunay, like the rest of the artists mentioned above, worked in a neoclassical style. Taunay’s early subject matter consisted mostly of landscapes and Biblical paintings. After joining the Mission in Brazil, Taunay often placed Biblical and mythological figures or scenes into Brazilian landscapes.

== Bibliography ==
- Encyclopedia Britannica Editors. “Nicolas-Antoine Taunay.” Encyclopedia Britannica, 16 Mar. 2025
- Felix, Regina R., Juall, Scott D. “Cultural Exchanges between Brazil and France.” Purdue University Press, 2016, West Lafayette, Indiana.
- Prado, Maria Ligia Coelho. “Visions of the Nation in Imperial Brazil: Arts and Celebrations.” Oxford Research Encyclopedia of Latin American History, 28 Aug. 2018.
- Williams, Daryle. “Peculiar Circumstances of the Land: Artists and Models in Nineteenth-Century Brazilian Slave Society.” EBSCO Host Research Platform, 23 Apr. 2025.

== Footnote ==
A.The school changed names three times:

- Academia Imperial de Belas Artes (Imperial Academy of Fine Arts, 1816-1890)
- Escola Nacional de Belas Artes (National School of Fine Arts, 1890-1965)
- Escola de Belas Artes da Universidade Federal do Rio de Janeiro (The School of Fine Arts of the Federal University of Rio de Janeiro, 1965-present)
