= Auguste Marie Taunay =

French sculptor

Auguste–Marie Taunay
- Born: 1768; Paris, France
- Died: 1824 (aged 55–56); Rio de Janeiro, Brazil
- Occupation: Sculptor

Auguste-Marie Taunay (1768–1824) was a French sculptor.

== Early years ==
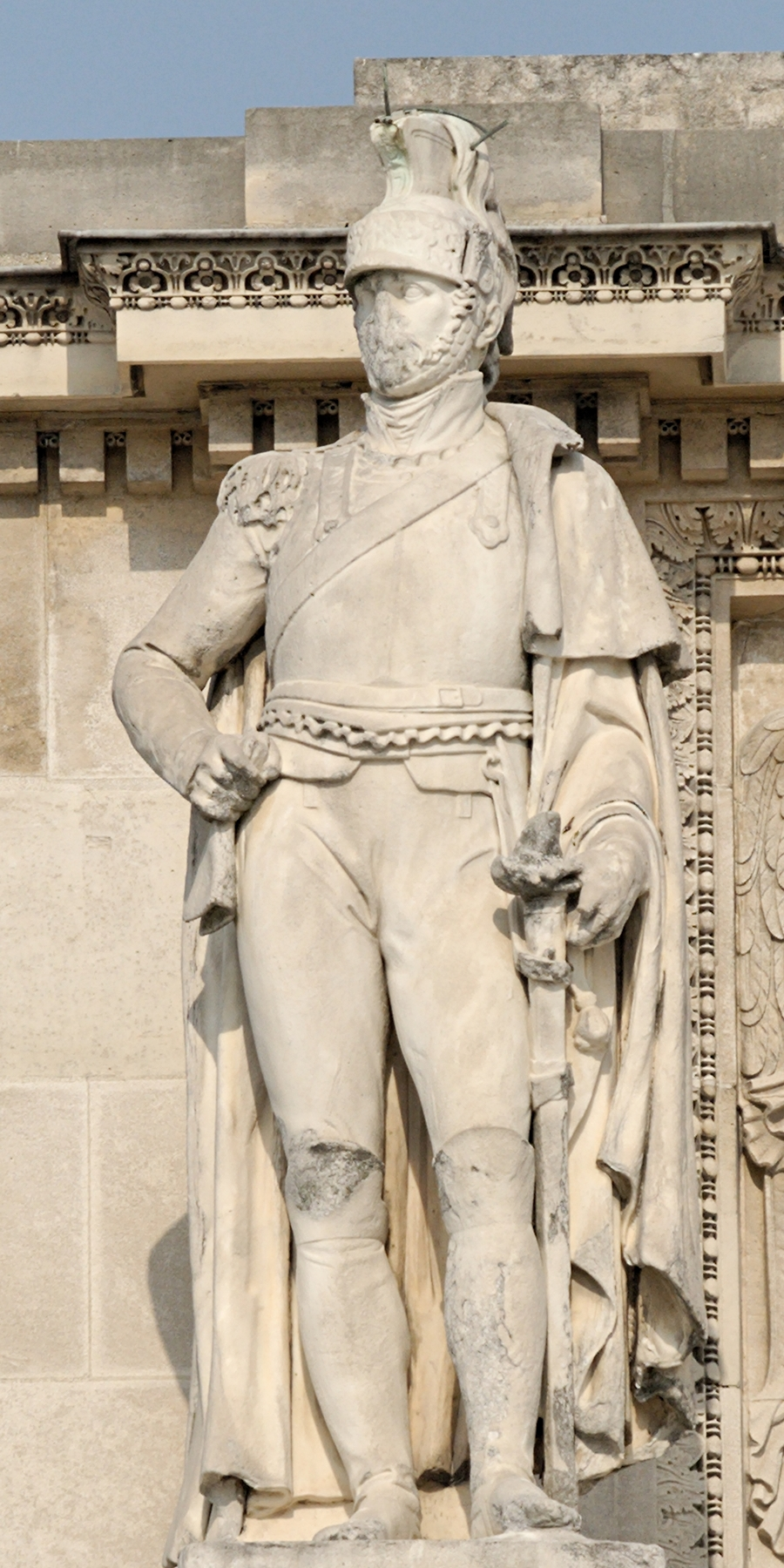
The Cuirassier (1807) on the entablement of the Arc de Triomphe du Carrousel

Auguste-Marie Taunay was born in Paris in 1768. He studied sculpture under Jean Guillaume Moitte (1746–1810) at the École des Beaux-Arts in Paris. At the age of 24 he was awarded the first prize for Sculpture, the Prix de Rome, on 1 September 1792 for a bas-relief. Due to the turmoil of the early phases of the French Revolution (1789–1799) he did not travel to Rome. He worked as a sculptor at the Manufacture nationale de Sèvres, a porcelain works, from 1802 to 1807. He decorated the Louvre Palace stairway and made a statue of The Cuirassier (1807) for the Arc de Triomphe du Carrousel. Between 1808 and 1814 he exhibited in several Salons. He made a well-known statue of Napoleon with his arms crossed.

== Brazil ==
Taunay was a member of the Missão Artística Francesa (French Artistic Mission) organized by Joachim Lebreton which brought a group of artists to Brazil, arriving on 25 March 1816. These included the painter Jean-Baptiste Debret (1768–1848), Auguste's brother the painter Nicolas Antoine Taunay (1755–1830), the engraver Charles-Simon Pradier (1786–1847)), the sculptor Marc Ferrez (1788–1850), his brother the engraver Zepherin Ferrez (1797–1851) and the architect Auguste-Henri-Victor Grandjean de Montigny (1776–1850). They were to form the nucleus of a royal art academy in Brazil.

The arrival of the French group caused some controversy among the local Portuguese intelligentsia, who were concerned at the excessive influence being given to the French in developing the cultural life of Brazil. In turn, the French were unhappy with political appointments such as the appointment of Henrique José da Silva as head of the school in place of Lebreton. This was the reason why Tauney's brother, Nicholas Antoine Taunay, returned to France.

Taunay was appointed professor of sculpture at the Imperial Academy of Fine Arts in Rio, but did not take up the post. In 1818 he worked with Grandjean de Montigny and Debret on the decorations of the Largo do Paço for the celebrations of the accession of King John VI of Portugal. For this he made a sculpture of Minerva protecting the Bust of the Monarch with her Aegis. He made a plaster bust of Luís de Camões, now held by the Brazilian Historical and Geographical Institute in Rio de Janeiro.

Taunay died in Rio de Janeiro in 1824.

== Works ==
The best-known works of Taunay include:

- Jean-Baptiste Muiron, chef de battalion (1774–1796), marble bust, in the Palace of Versailles
- Antoine-Louis-Charles, comte de Lasalle-général (1775–1809), marble sculpture, 1st Empire period (1804–1814) (height 219 centimetres (86 in)), in the Palace of Versailles
- Bust of Antoine-Louis-Charles, Earl Lasalle, General Division (1775–1809), modeled in plaster, in the Palace of Versailles
- Decoration of the Escalier du Midi in the Louvre
- Decoration of the Arc de Triomphe du Carrousel
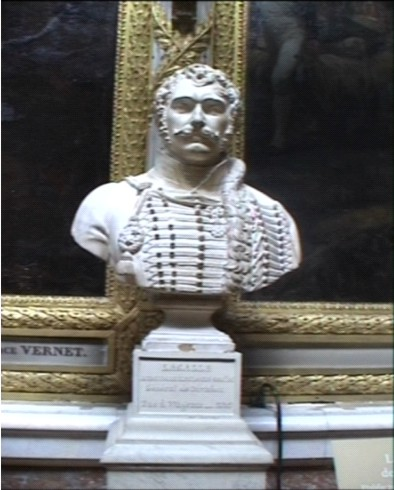
Antoine Charles Louis de Lasalle, French cavalry General during the Revolutionary and Napoleonic Wars known as “The Hussar General"

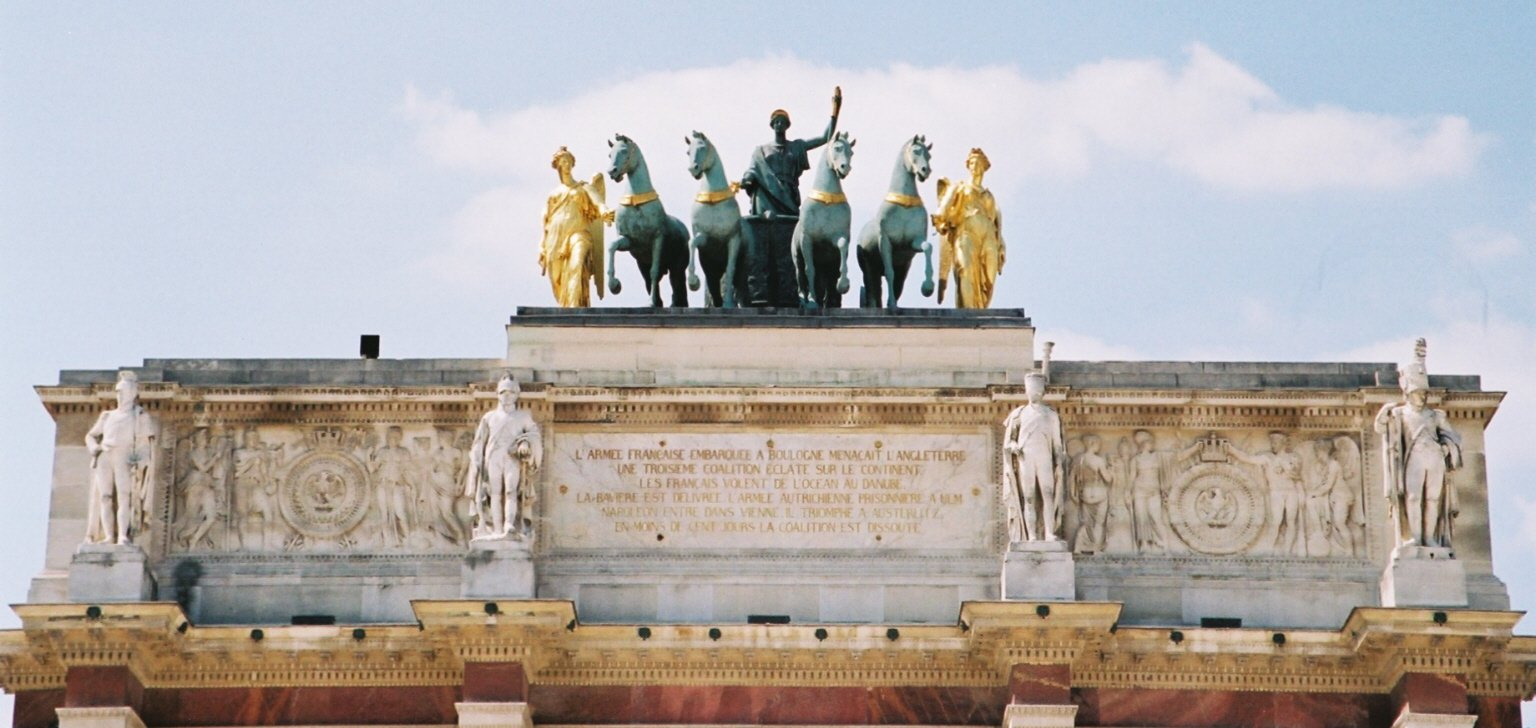
Upper frieze with sculptures of soldiers: Taunay's cuirassier (left), Corbet's dragoon, Joseph Chinard's horse grenadier and Jacques-Edme Dumont's sapper.

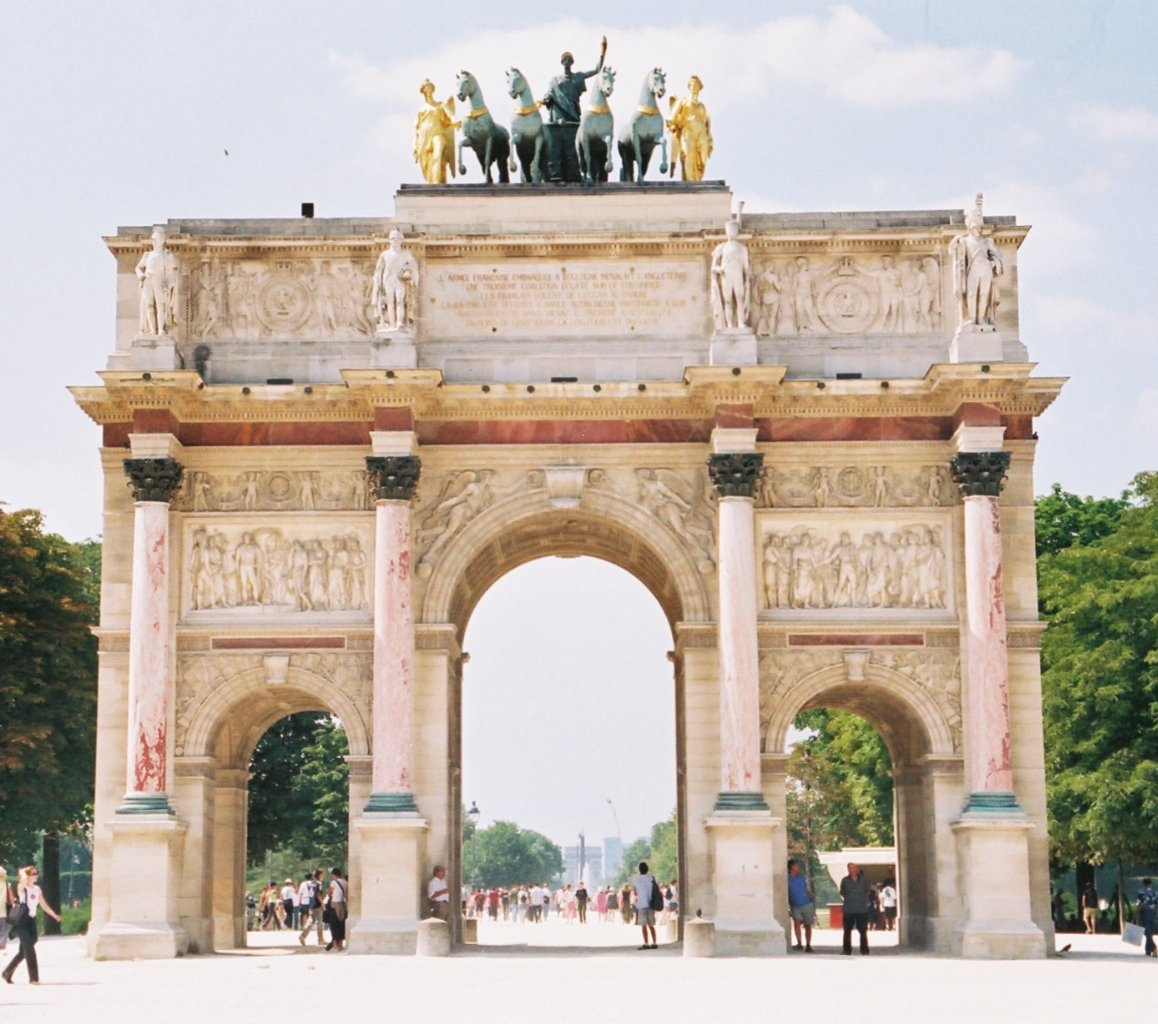
General view of the Arc de Triomphe du Carrousel

== Sources ==
- Académie royale de peinture et de sculpture (1892). Procès-verbaux de l'Académie royale de peinture et de sculpture, 1648-1793. J. Baur.
- Sadlier, Darlene J. (2010-01-01). Brazil Imagined: 1500 to the Present. University of Texas Press. ISBN 978-0-292-77473-5.
- "Taunay, Auguste–Marie (1768–1824)". Encyclopédie Itaú Cultural arts visuels (in French). 4 October 2013.
- Williams, Daryle (2001-07-12). Culture Wars in Brazil: The First Vargas Regime, 1930–1945. Duke University Press. ISBN 0-8223-2719-8.
