= Chaves Pinheiro =

Brazilian sculptor

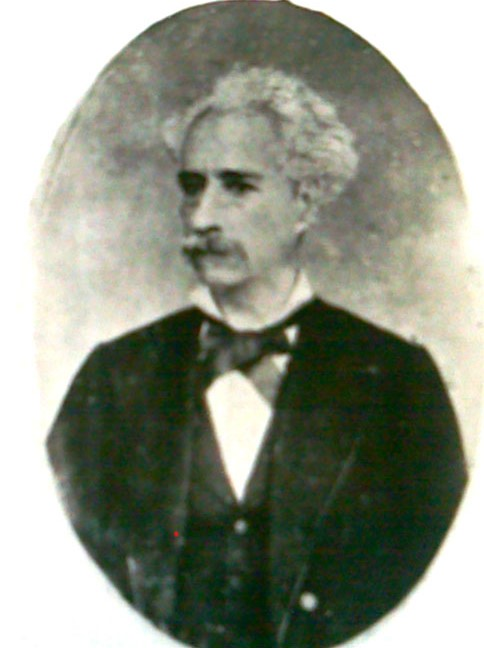
- Born: Francisco Manuel Chaves Pinheiro; 5 September 1822; Rio de Janeiro, Brazil
- Died: 19 October 1884 (aged 62); Rio de Janeiro, Brazil
- Occupation: Sculptor

Francisco Manuel Chaves Pinheiro (5 September 1822 – 19 October 1884) was a Brazilian sculptor.

== Career ==
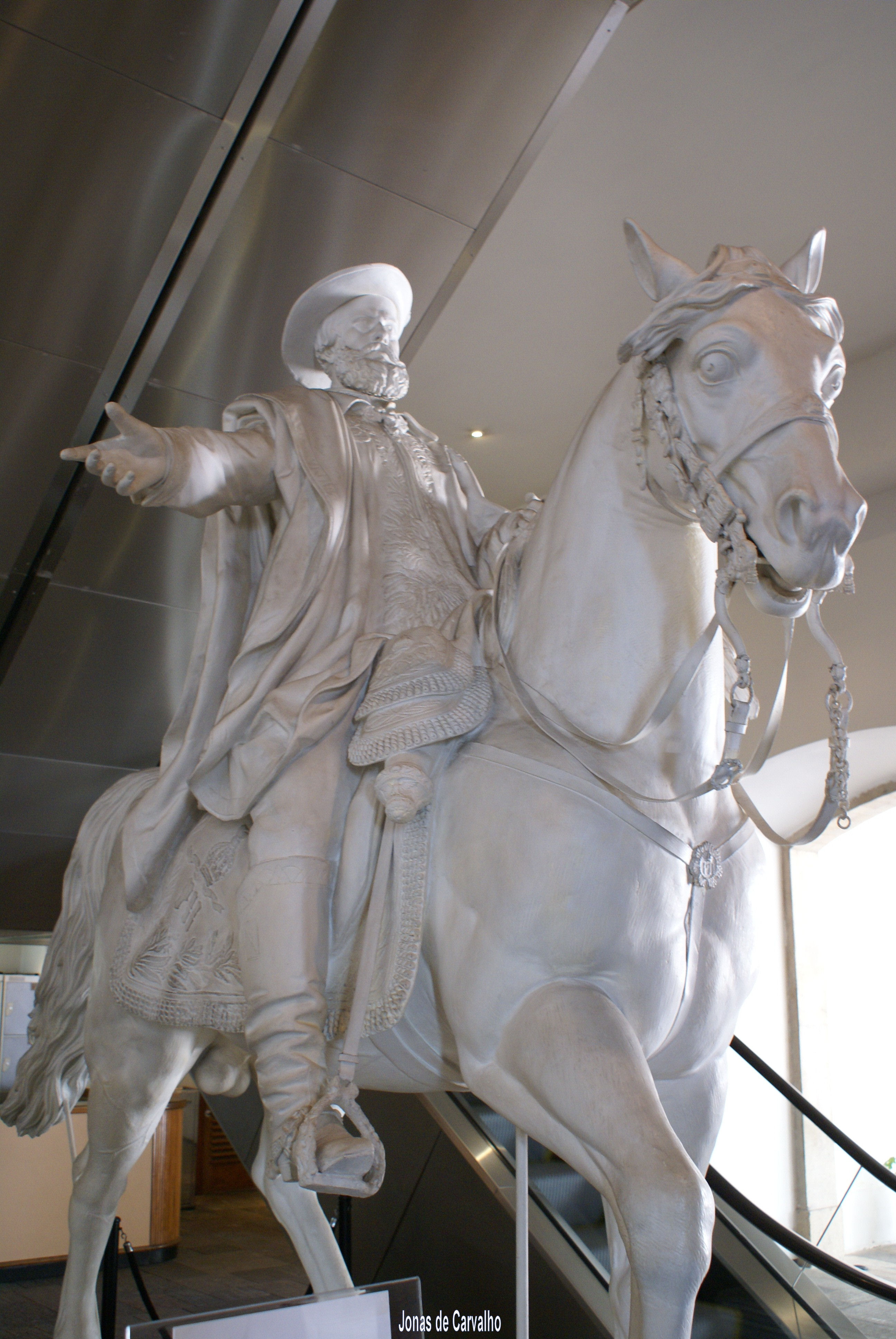
Equestrian statue of Pedro II

Francisco Manuel Chaves Pinheiro was born in Rio de Janeiro on 5 September 1822. His parents were Úrsula Maria das Virgens and Manoel Bernardes Chaves. He entered the Imperial Academy of Fine Arts (Academia Imperial das Belas Artes) in 1835, at the age of thirteen. He registered in the Drawing class as Francisco Manoel Chaves de Bragança, adopting his mother's name. He enrolled in the sculpture class in 1836 as a student of Marc Ferrez. Chaves Pinheiro was to become one of Ferrez's best-known pupils. In December 1845 at the age of 23 he won the Academy's gold medal for his Allegory of the Liberation of Brazil.

Chaves Pinheiro married Narcissa Ferreira Netto, and then Amelia Josephine Ramos. He had two daughters with his second wife, Claudiana and Narcisa. He was a member of the Masonic lodge of Rio de Janeiro. At the age of 29 he was appointed professor of Sculpture and Statuary at the Academy. He held this post for thirty-three years, from 1851 until his death in 1884. At the Academy Chaves Pinheiro taught, created sculptures and also sat on committees to analyze submissions from European students applying for scholarships, and to decide on Brazilian submissions to international exhibitions. Chaves Pinheiro died of heart problems on 19 October 1884 in Rio de Janeiro.

== Work ==
Most of Chaves Pinheiro's work was made at the Academy starting with clay models that were then finished in plaster, bronze or iron with help from his students. In some cases he started with a sketch model about 1/3 of the final work's size. He made some works in marble or wood, but was best known for his bronze portraits of prominent people. The Academy donated the material for this work, and the Imperial government was the main customer. This avoided the need to maintain a studio, difficult at that time in Rio de Janeiro. However, it imposed some rigidity over aesthetic standards. Most of his work followed conventional neoclassical lines, although much of his work also showed a Romantic inclination.

In 1864 Chaves Pinheiro presented a model for a huge equestrian statue of the Emperor Pedro II of Brazil to be executed in bronze. The model was presented at the Universal Exposition in Paris in 1867, but the project was not realized since Pedro II refused the honor, preferring that the money be spent on public education.
