= Pierre-Nicolas Beauvallet =

French sculptor (1750–1818)

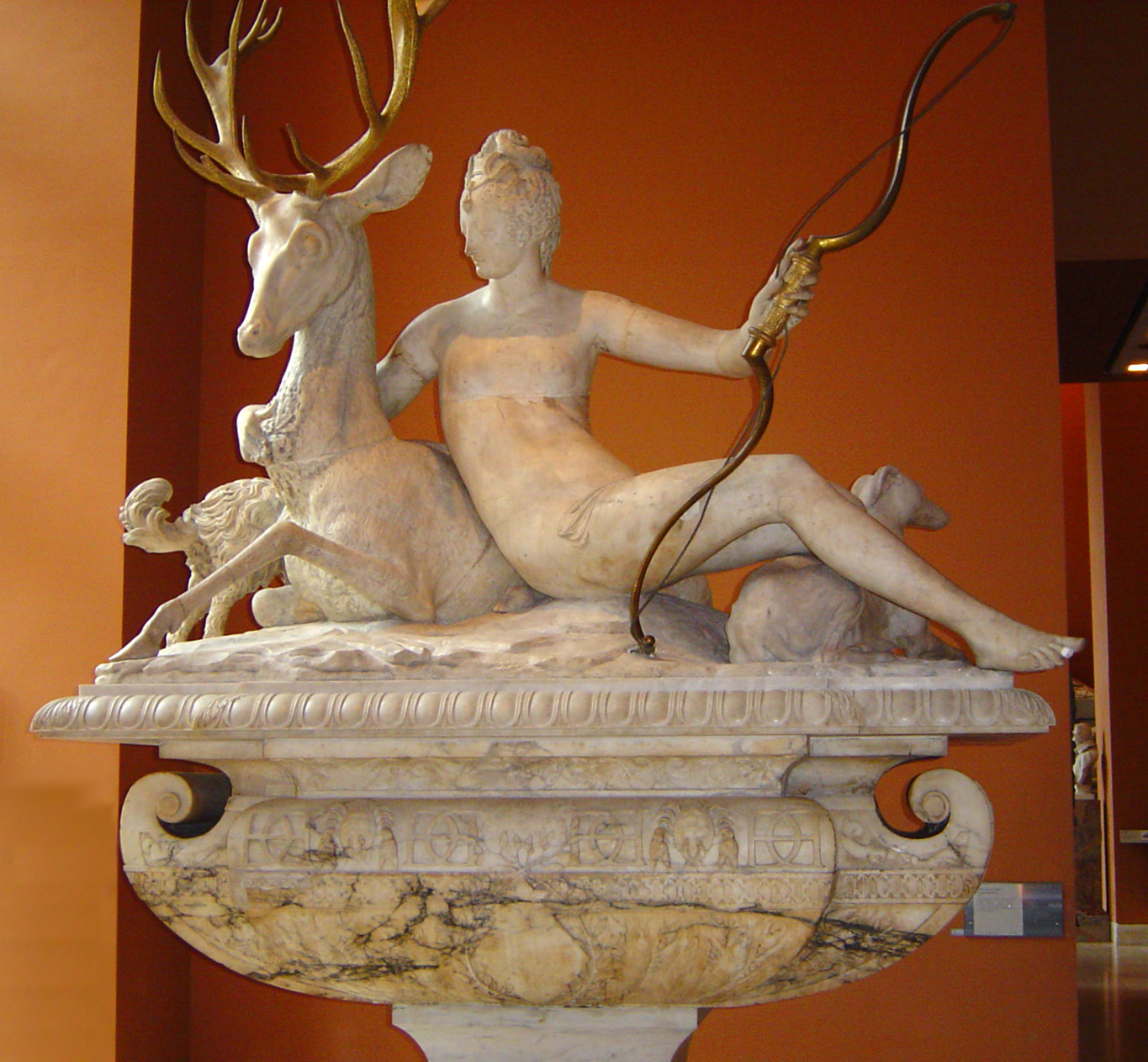
La Fontaine de Diane, restored by Beauvallet.

Pierre-Nicolas Beauvallet (born in Le Havre on 21 June 1750 and died in Paris on 15 April 1818), was a French sculptor, draftsman and printmaker.

On 21 August 1793, he was appointed director of public works of the Commune of Paris. On 7 July 1794, he was received at the Club des Jacobins after having given a bust of Guillaume Tell proposed by Jacques-Louis David on a project of Collot d'Herbois.

He then worked for the restoration of medieval and Renaissance sculptures for the Musée national des Monuments Français of Alexandre Lenoir, including the famous Fontaine de Diane.

== Main works ==
- Suzanne au bain, 1813, group, marble, Paris, Louvre
- Hygie, déesse de la santé soignant Mars, le dieu de la guerre
- Sully, statue, stone, Paris, palais Bourbon
- La Liberté sous les ruines de la Bastille, 1793
- La Force guidée par la raison ramène la Paix, le Commerce
- La Paix faisant hommage à la Liberté des prémices des faits de ses bienfaits
- La Tyrannie renversée, 1800
