= Nicolas-Antoine Taunay =

French painter

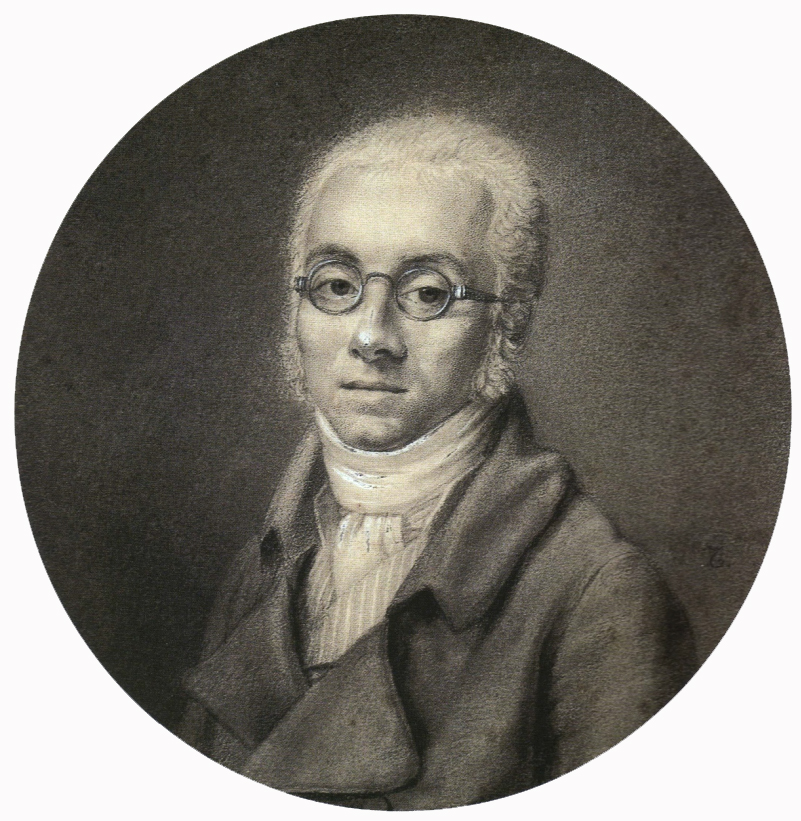
- Self-portrait (crayon on paper)
- Born: 10 February 1755; Paris, France
- Died: 20 March 1830 (aged 75); Paris, France
- Occupation: Painter

Nicolas-Antoine Taunay (10 February 1755 – 20 March 1830) was a French painter known best for his landscapes with scenes from ancient and modern history, mythology, and religion. He is the Patron of the 38th chair of the Brazilian Academy of Fine Arts.

== Early years ==
Nicolas Antoine Taunay was born in Paris, France, in 1755. His father was an enamel painter.

Taunay entered the École des Beaux-Arts in Paris at the age of fifteen and became a pupil of Nicolas-Bernard Lepicié. He later studied in the studios of Nicolas-Guy Brenet and Francesco Giuseppe Casanova. He specialized in painting landscapes. Taunay first exhibited his work at the Jeunesse and Salon de la Correspondance. In 1784 he was admitted as an assistant at the Royal Academy of Painting and Sculpture. He was now able to exhibit at official shows. Taunay obtained a three-year scholarship to study at the French Academy in Rome in the Palazzo Mancini. While in Italy he met the artist Jacques-Louis David.

After returning to France in 1787 Taunay exhibited in the Paris Salon. He married Josephine Rondel (1768–1844) soon after his return. They had six children, one of them being the also painter Félix Taunay, the father of French-Brazilian author Alfredo d'Escragnolle Taunay. He lived with his family in Montmorency, Val-d'Oise, during the Reign of Terror (1793–1794). He returned to Paris in 1796 and joined the newly formed Institut de France. In 1805 he painted scenes of Napoleon's campaigns in Germany. In 1806 he started contributing work to the Manufacture de Sévres. The Empress Josephine commissioned many paintings of battle scenes from him.

== Brazil ==
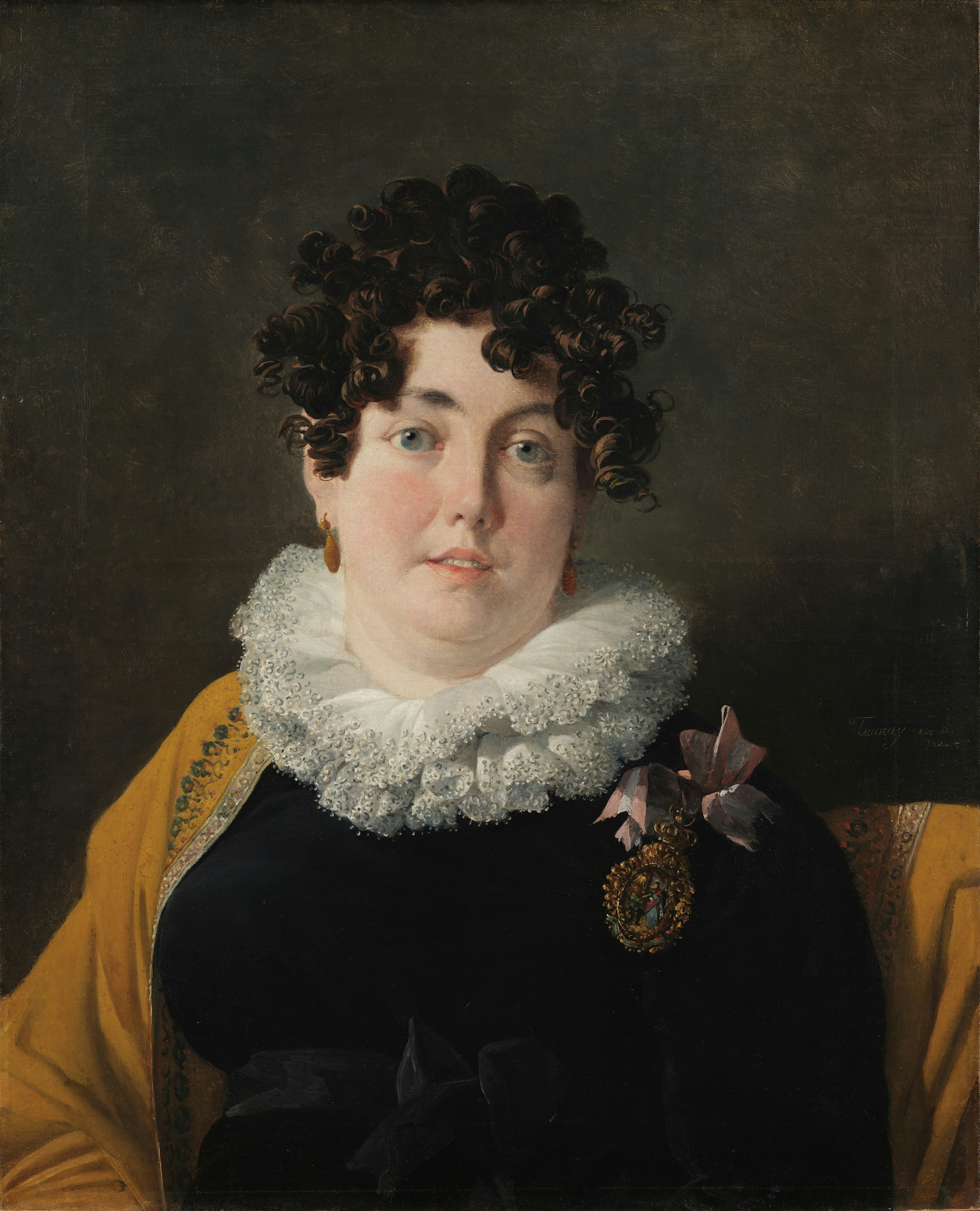
Portrait of the Marchioness of Belas (1816)

After the fall of Napoleon, Taunay moved to Brazil as a member of the Missão Artística Francesa (French Artistic Mission), funded by King John VI of Portugal. The Missão Artística Francesa was organized by Joachim Lebreton. He had brought a group of artists to Brazil, arriving in Rio de Janeiro on 25 March 1816. These included the painter Jean-Baptiste Debret, Nicolas's brother the sculptor Auguste Marie Taunay, the engraver Charles-Simon Pradier and the architect Auguste-Henri-Victor Grandjean de Montigny. They were to form the nucleus of a royal art academy in Brazil.

Nicolas-Antoine Taunay became a member of the Royal School of Sciences, Arts and Trades, later to become the Imperial Academy of Beaux-Arts, as professor of landscape painting.

The arrival of the French group caused some controversy among the local Portuguese intelligentsia, who were concerned at the excessive influence being given to the French in developing the cultural life of Brazil. In turn, the French were unhappy with political appointments such as the appointment of Henrique José da Silva as head of the school in place of Lebreton, who had died in 1819. For this reason, Nicolas-Antoine Taunay returned to France in 1821, holding the title of Baron of Taunay, granted by the Portuguese king.

Nicolas-Antoine Taunay died in 1830. During his lifetime, he was considered one of the greatest of the painters of the First French Empire. After his death he was soon forgotten, although his work went through a revival in popularity in the 1870s organized by the Goncourt brothers.

== Works ==
Although his main interest was historical landscape painting, Nicolas-Antoine Taunay was also a skilled painter of portraits and battle scenes. His style reflects Dutch and classical French influences.

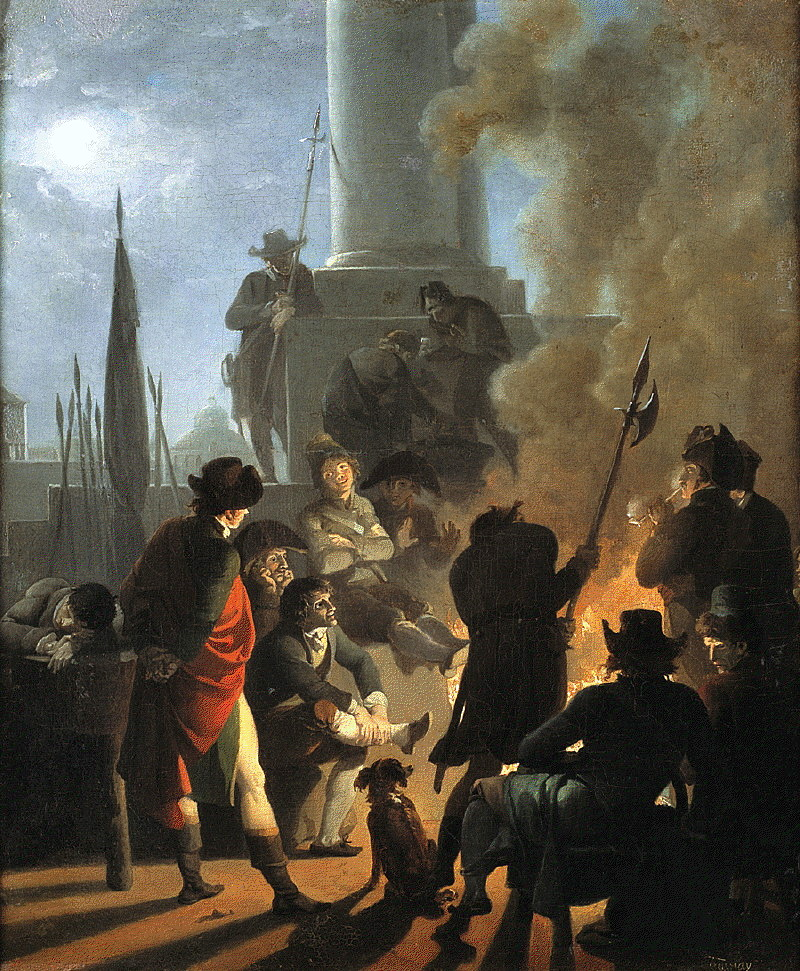
Le bivouac des sans-coulottes, 1790

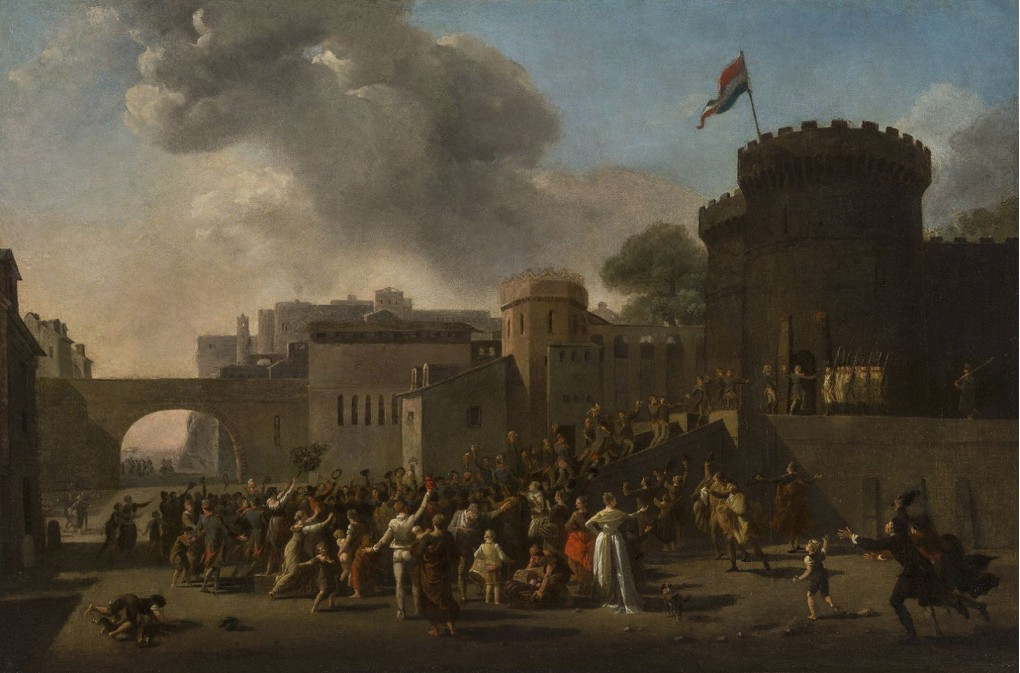
Bravery and patriotism of French soldiers detained in prison, 1794

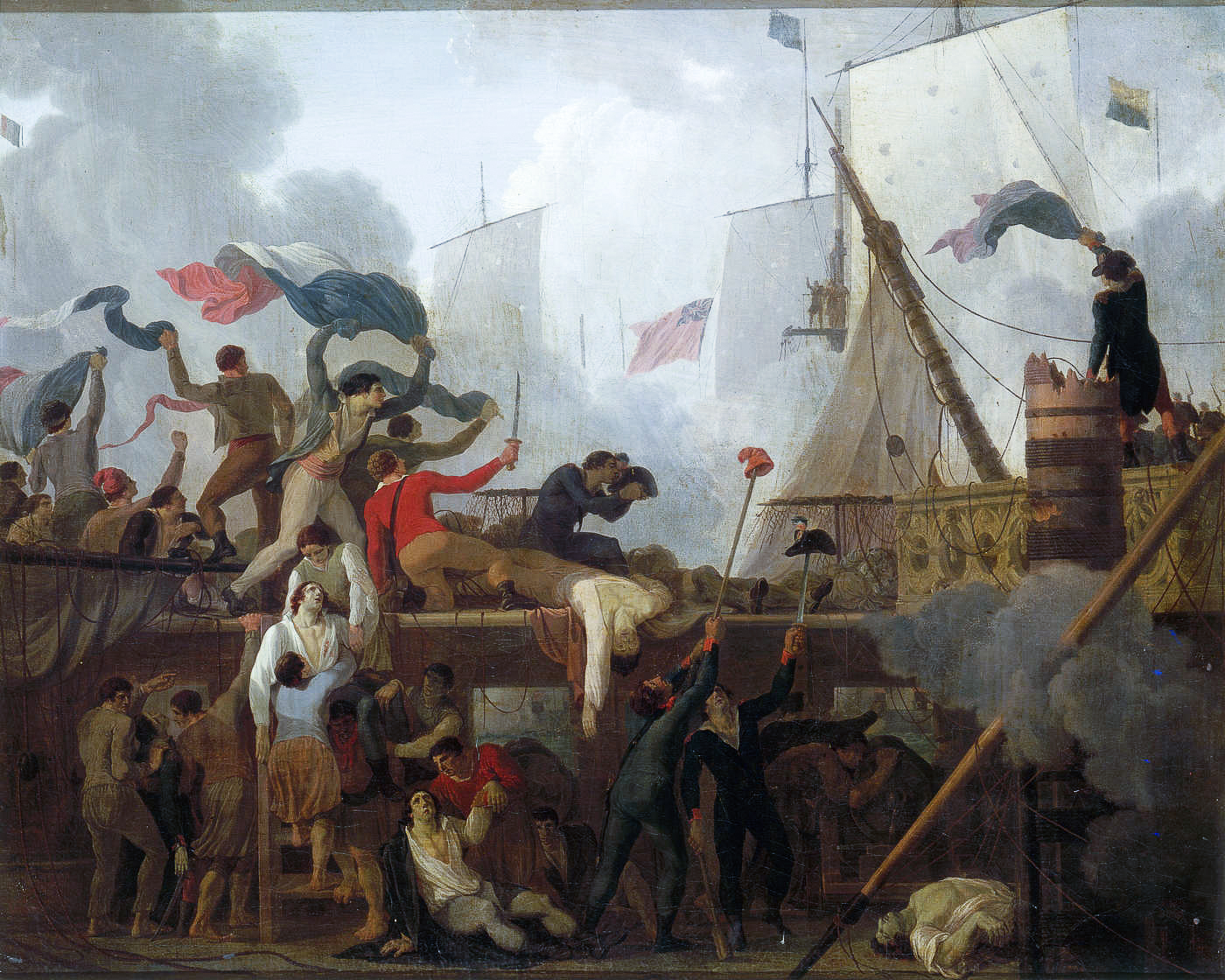
Heroism of the sailors of the ship of the line Vengeur under captain Renaudin, 1795

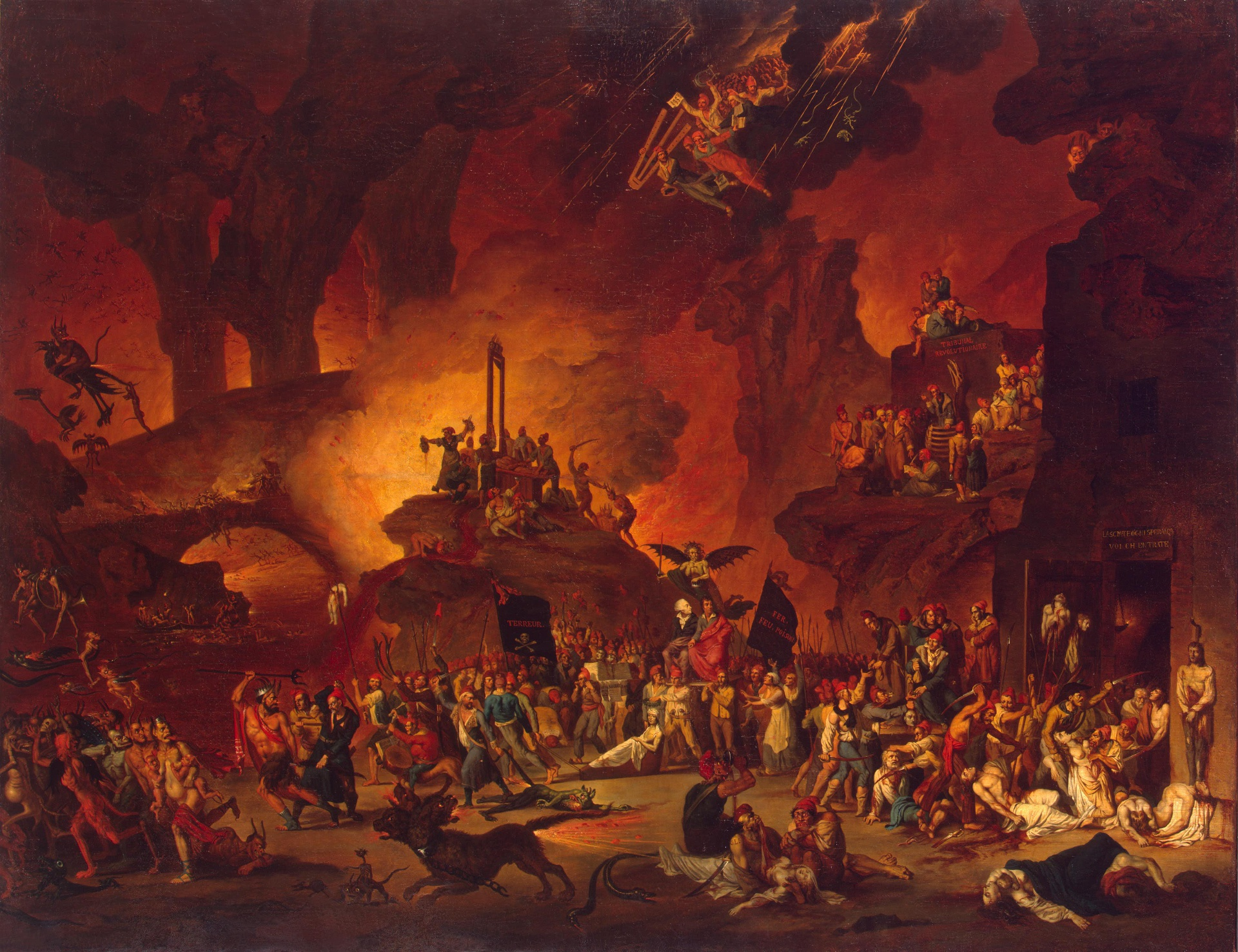
Le triomphe de la guillotine, 1795

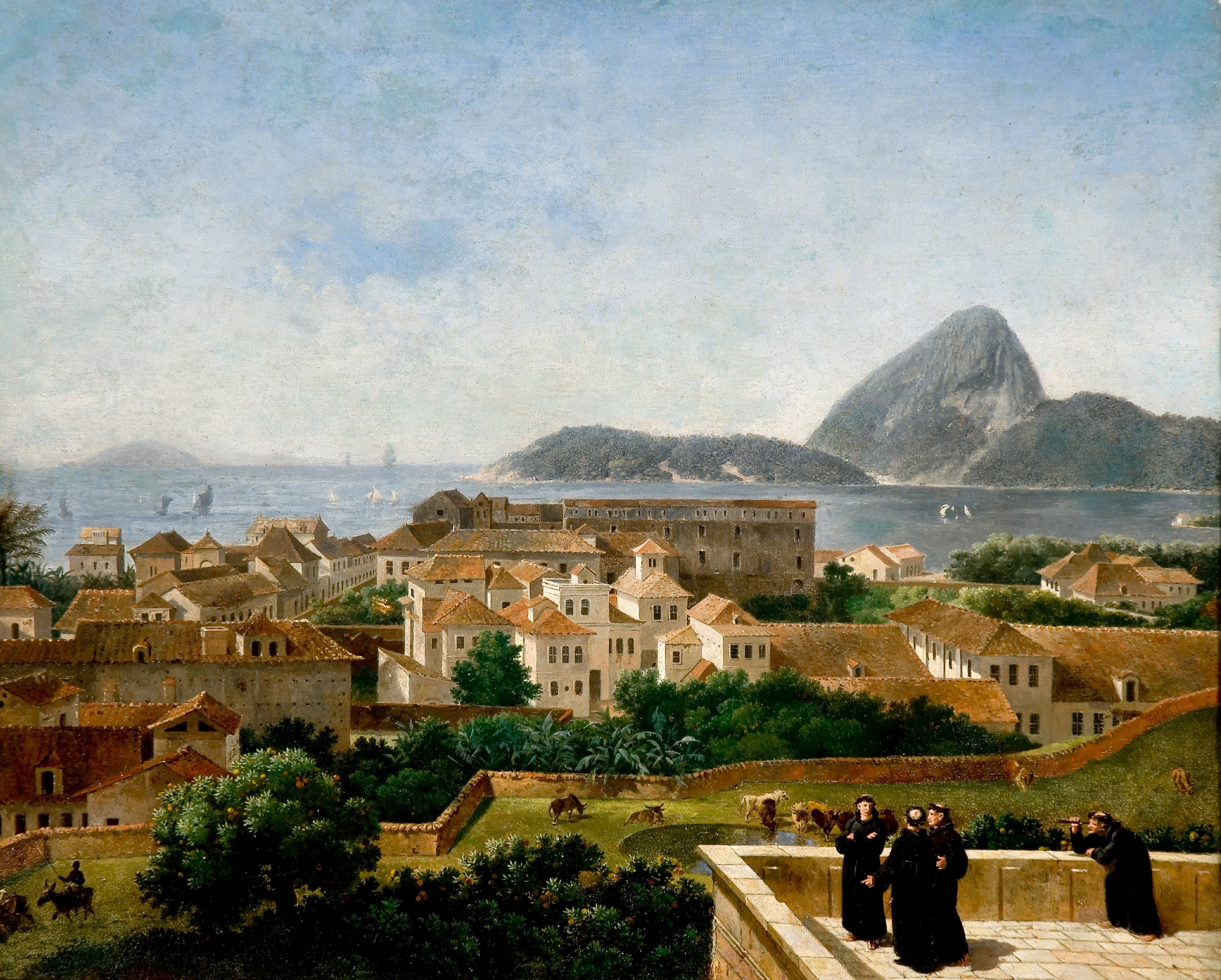
View of the bay and the entry of the city of Rio as seen from the terrace of the convent of Santo Antônio, 1816

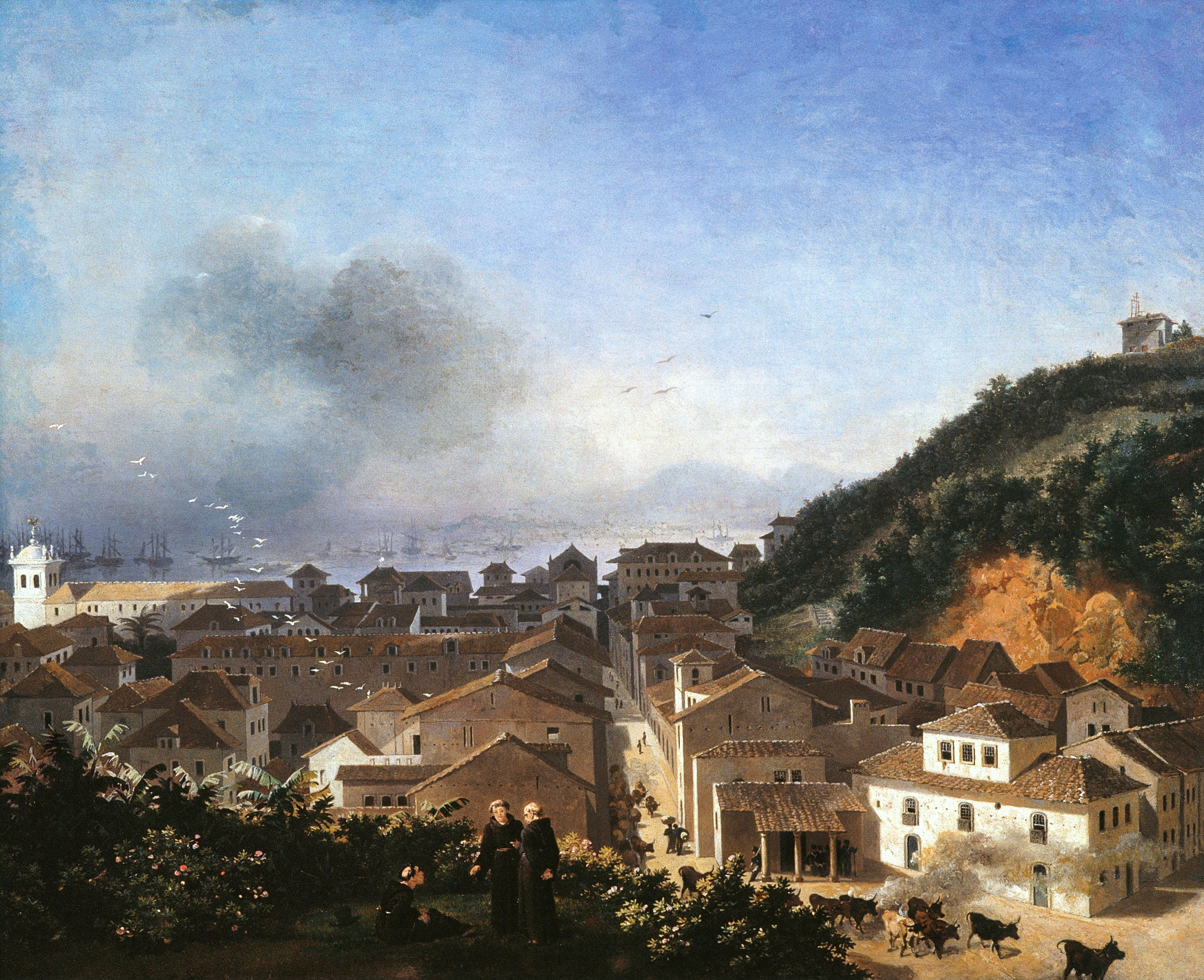
Carioca Square, Rio de Janeiro, 1816

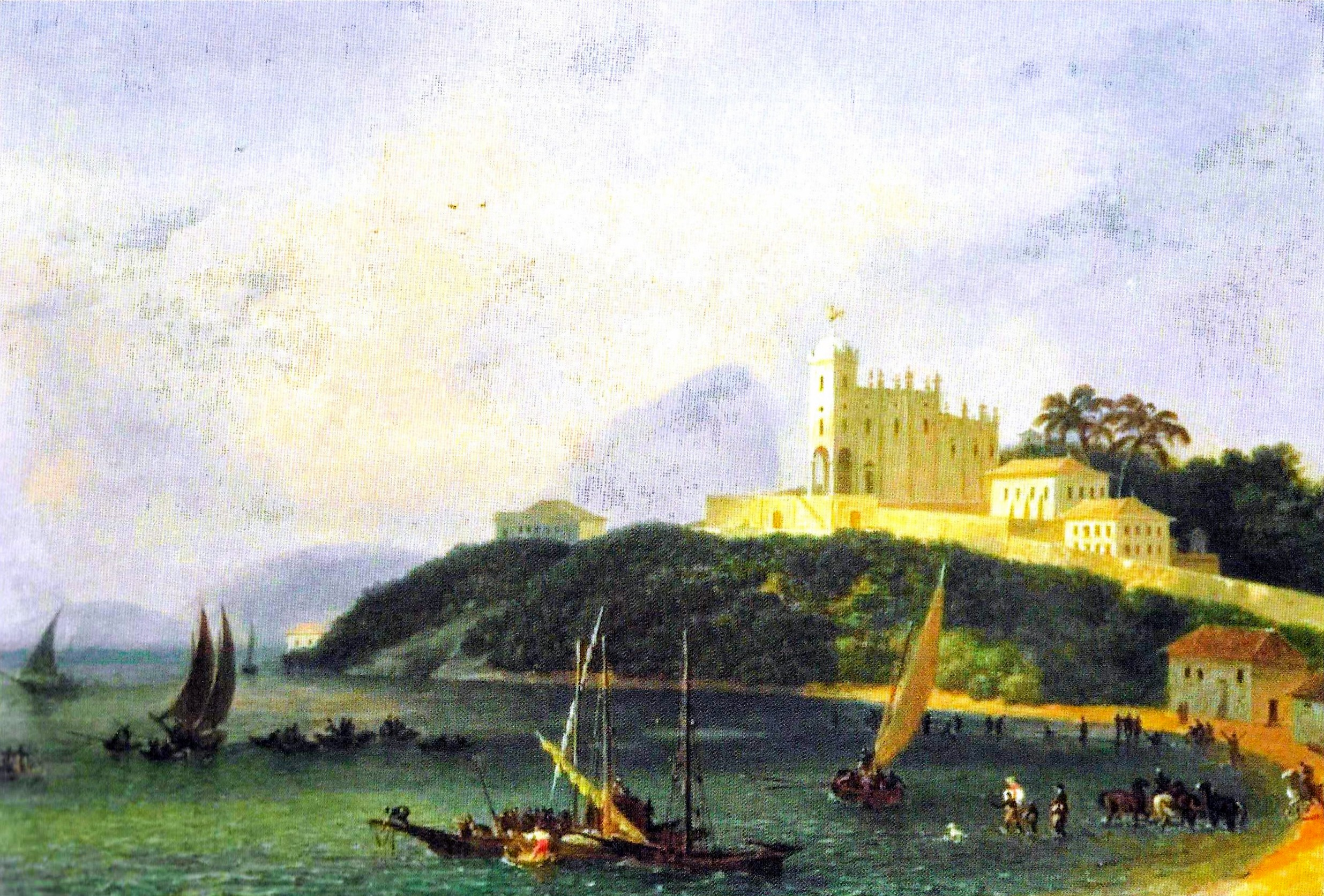
View from the Outeiro, the beach and the Church of Glória, c. 1817

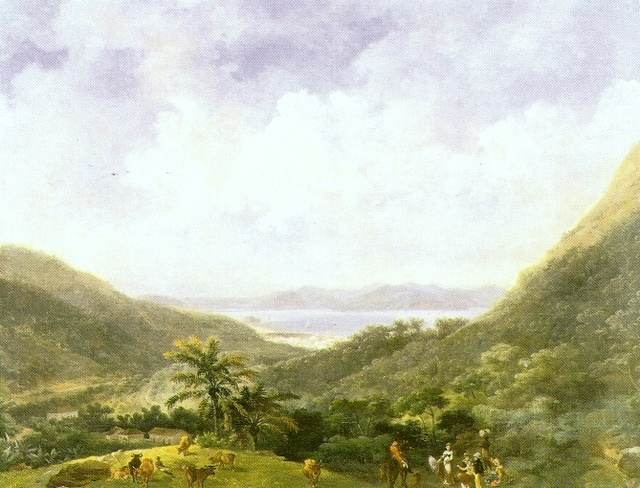
View of Rio de Janeiro bay from the mountains in Tijuca, c. 1820

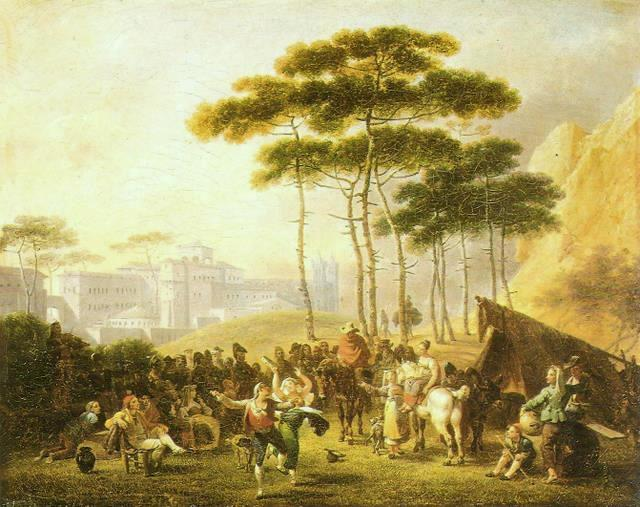
Napolitan Festival, 1824

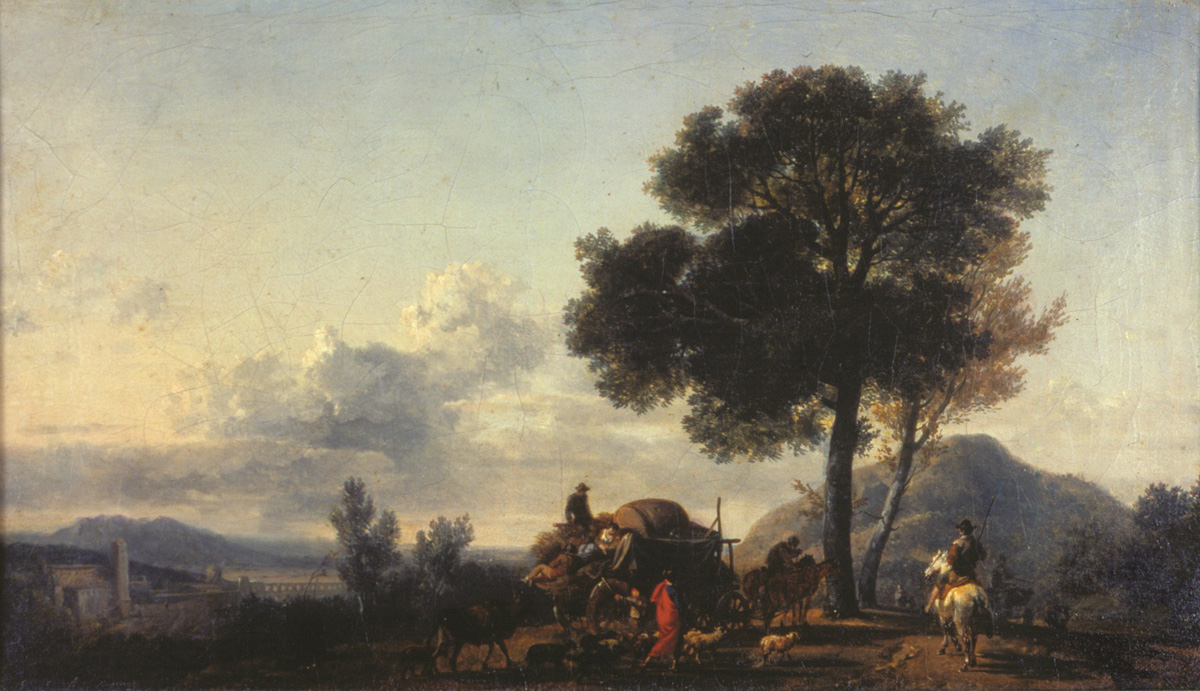
Pastoral landscape
