= Marc Ferrez (photographer) =

Brazilian photographer 1843–1923

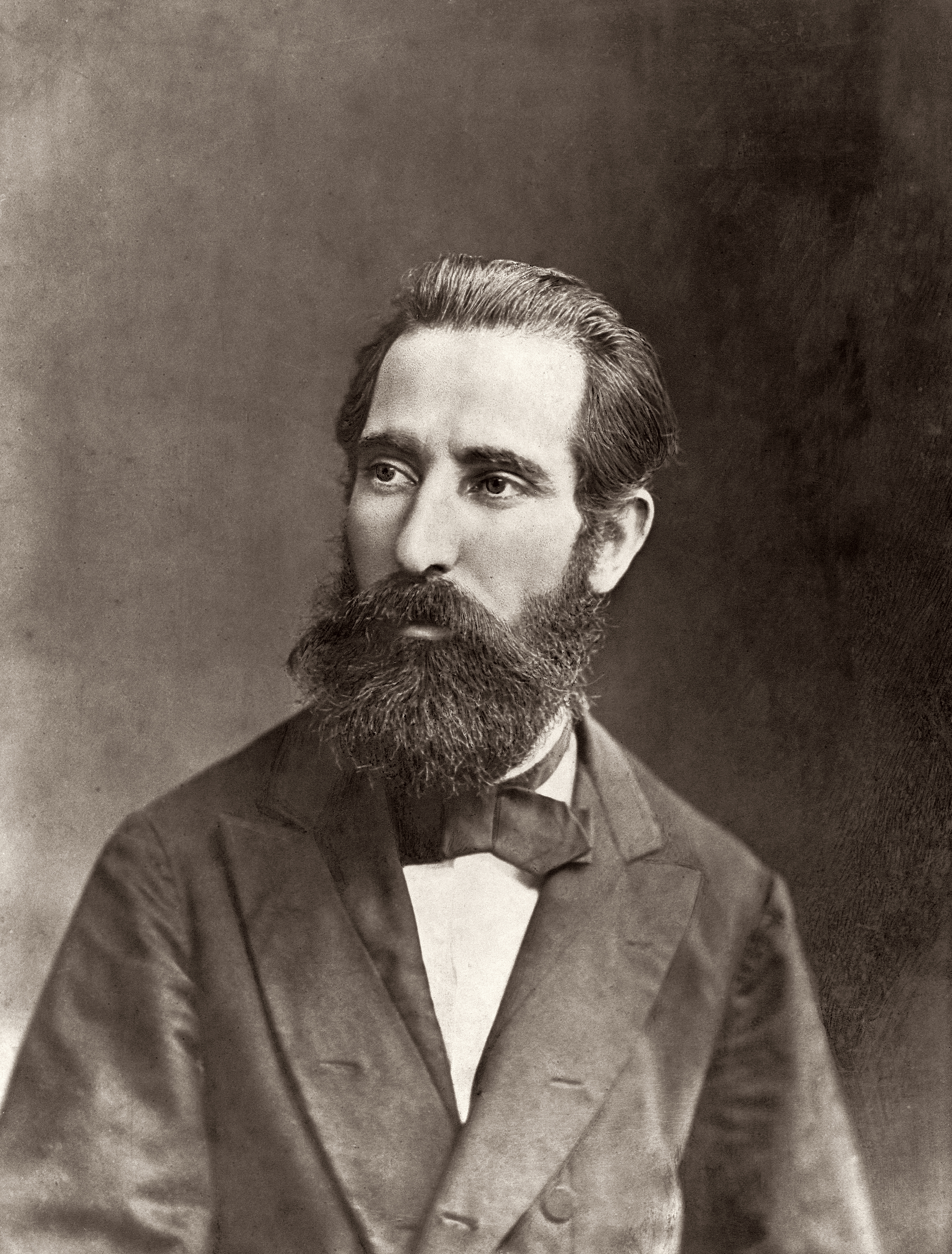
- 1876 self-portrait of Ferrez
- Born: 7 December 1843; Rio de Janeiro, Brazil
- Died: 12 July 1923 (aged 79); Rio de Janeiro, Brazil
- Occupation: Photographer
- Parent: Zepherin Ferrez (father)

Signature
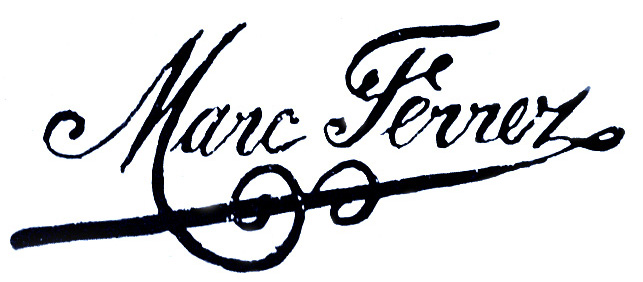

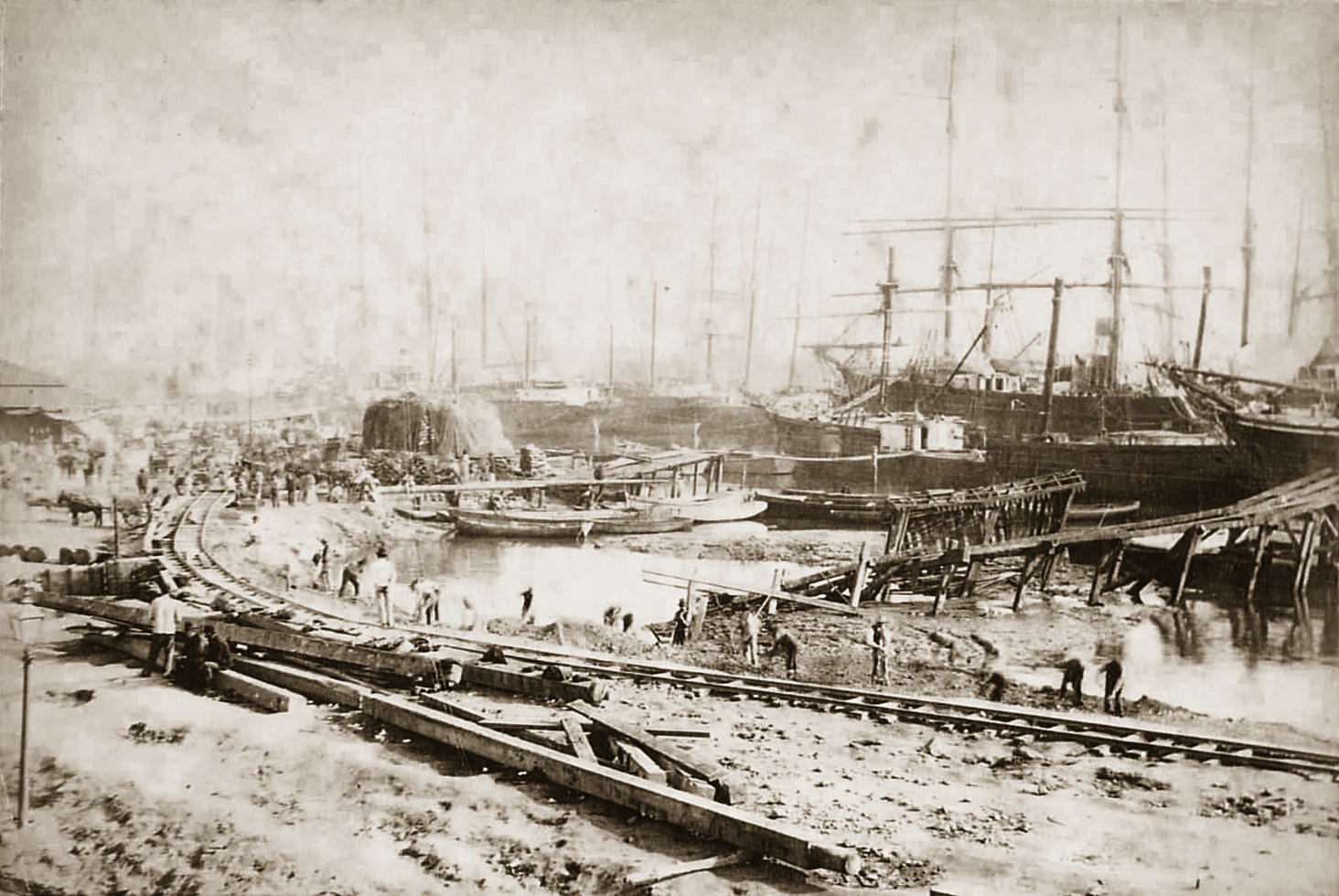
Port of Santos – São Paulo (Brazil) Marc Ferrez – 1870

Marc Ferrez (7 December 1843 – 12 January 1923) was a Brazilian photographer active in Rio de Janeiro. He photographed Brazil from south to north, but paid more attention to his home city, Rio de Janeiro. Ferrez is most well known for his albums of railway constructions and the panoramic views of the city of Rio de Janeiro and its development. His other popular works document architecture and Brazil's natural features, such as mountains, waterfalls, and jungles. Ferrez is considered by photography historians to be a master at his craft; his work is on the same level as famous photographers William Henry Jackson and Eadweard Muybridge.

== Biography ==
Marc Ferrez was the son of the French sculptor and engraver Zepherin Ferrez who moved to Rio de Janeiro in 1816. Marc Ferrez was born in Rio de Janeiro, Brazil. He studied in Paris then came back to Rio as an apprentice to photographer Franz Keller of Germany. In 1865, Ferrez opened his own photography studio where he primarily focused of landscapes and Brazilian nature. His work became so popular that Emperor Dom Pedro II gave him funds to support his art, allowing Ferrez to explore every angle that the camera had to offer. Just eight years after its opening, in 1873, his studio burned down. He returned to France to purchase a new camera, opting for one that had the capability of taking panoramic photos. This was a view of photography that was still in its infancy. When he finally returned to Rio de Janeiro, he focused on rural landscapes and documenting slaves working on the plantations. Between 1875 and 1876, Ferrez joined American Charles Frederick Hartt on a geological and geographic expedition to the inner province of Bahia. It was during this trip that Ferrez photographed the indigenous Botocudo tribe, and widely employed techniques of panoramic photography, of which he would later be regarded as a master.

Ferrez's life was dedicated to the art of photography and he is considered one of the greatest photographers of his time. His production was massive, and his photographs document the consolidation of Brazil as a nation and Rio de Janeiro as a metropolis. Emperor Pedro II declared Ferrez the "photographer of the Royal Navy", because of his superior skill of neutralizing the ships movements. In 1876, he entered his photos with an ethnological interest into the Centennial International Exhibition in Pennsylvania. He won a gold medal. In 1882 he won in the South American Continental Exhibition in Buenos Aires. In 1904, he entered his material into the St. Louis Worlds Fair and was the only photographer to win a gold medal. In 1907, he opened his own picture house in Rio de Janeiro, Pathé Cinema. It was here that he tried out new technology that enhanced the field of photography.

During the end of his life he focused more on photographing architecture and street scenes in Rio de Janeiro. Ferrez died in 1923 and left thousands of pictures and reproductions of his works.

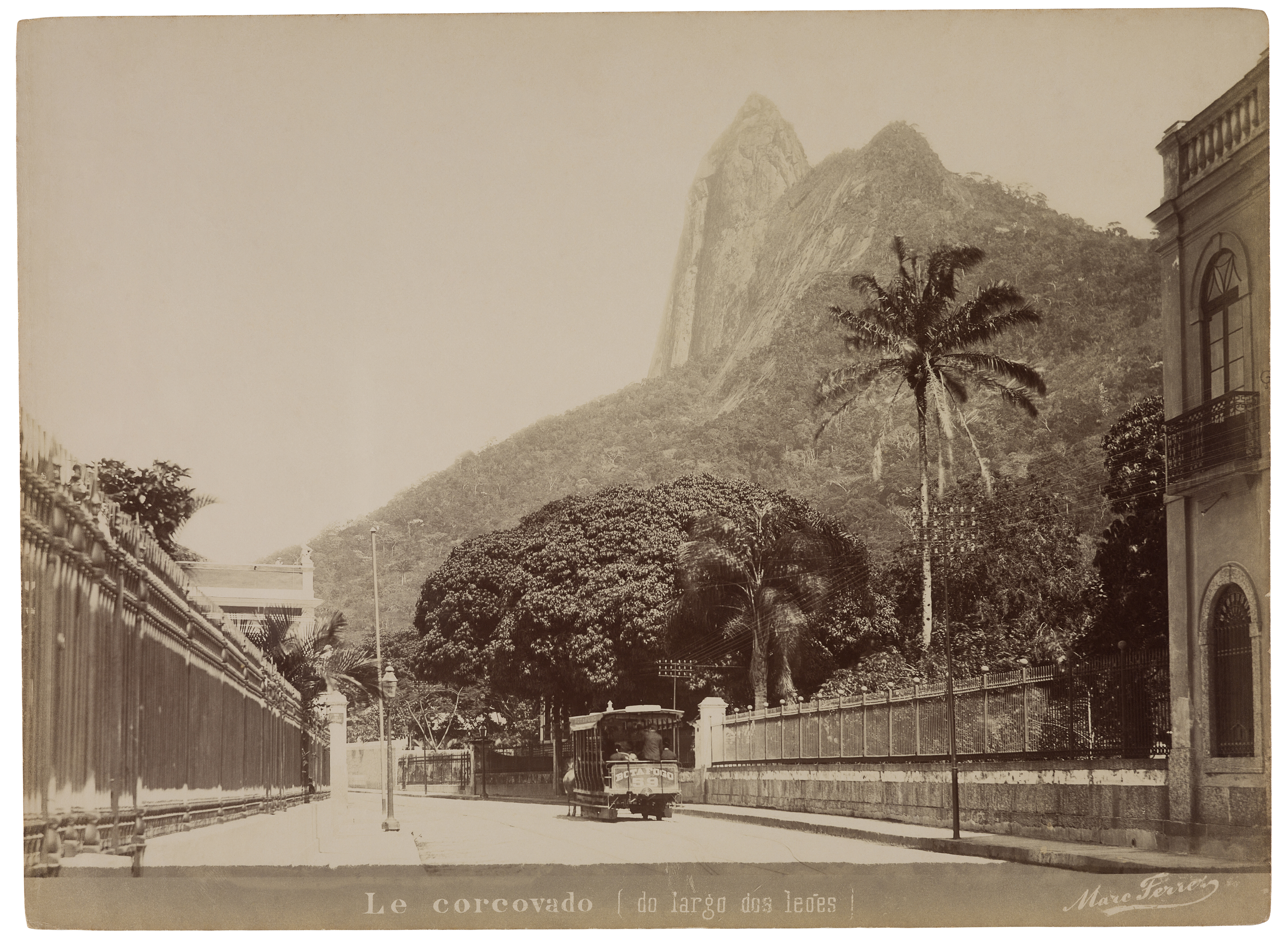
Photo taken by Marc Ferrez from Largo dos Leões of the Corcovado mountain
