= Grandjean de Montigny =

French architect

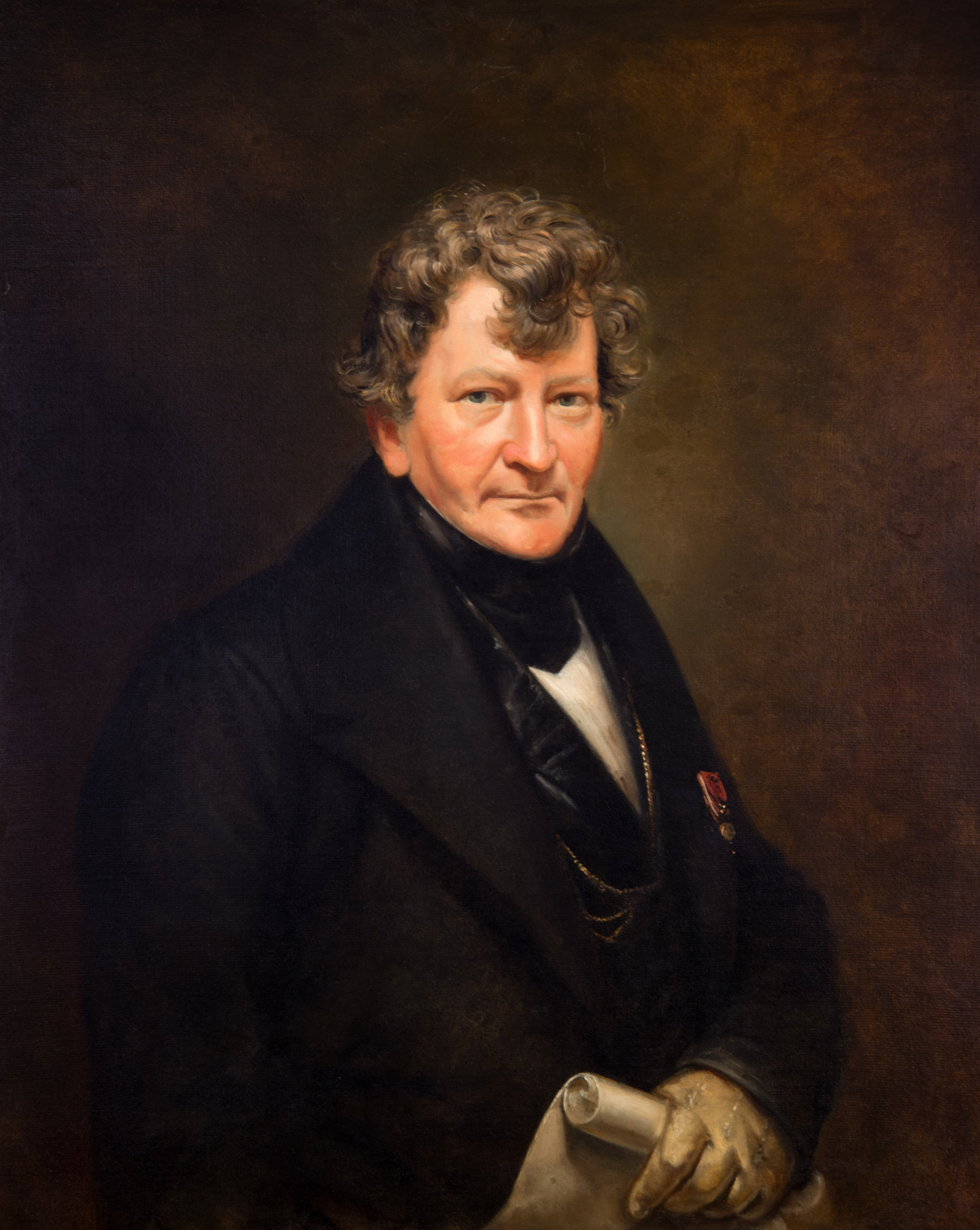
- Portrait by Augusto Müller, 1843
- Born: Auguste-Henri-Victor Grandjean de Montigny; 15 July 1776; Paris, France
- Died: 2 March 1850 (aged 73); Rio de Janeiro, Brazil
- Occupation: Architect
- Known for: Classical buildings in Rio de Janeiro
- Relatives: Arnaud Pallière (son-in-law); Jean Léon Pallière (grandson)

Auguste-Henri-Victor Grandjean de Montigny (15 July 1776 – 2 March 1850) was a French architect who had considerable influence on the development of architecture in Brazil. He is the Patron of the 14th chair of the Brazilian Academy of Fine Arts.

== Early years ==
Auguste-Henri-Victor Grandjean de Montigny was born on 15 July 1776 in the parish of St-Merry in Paris. He studied architecture with Charles Percier and Pierre-François-Léonard Fontaine, and became a neo-classicist. He won the Prix de Rome in 1799. In 1802 he went to Rome with the new director of the French school, and was responsible for the work needed to prepare the Villa Medici for students. In 1810 he was appointed architect to Jérôme Bonaparte, King of Westphalia. He rebuilt the state rooms of the Bellevue Palace in Kassel, a triumphal gate, public fountains and the theatre. He was named first architect of the king in 1812. He returned to France in 1814 when Napoleon was deposed.

== Brazil ==
Grandjean de Montigny refused an offer from Russia in favor of one to go to Brazil. He moved to Brazil in 1816 at the invitation of King John VI of Portugal (1816–26), who wanted to improve the cultural level of the colony. He arrived in Rio de Janeiro on 12 March 1816. He represented architecture among the French artistic colony organized and led by Joachim Lebreton, who created the Academy of Fine Arts in Rio. These artists had been educated at the École des Beaux-Arts and had been forced into exile after the fall of Napoleon. Other members of the group included the two brothers Nicolas-Antoine Taunay, painter of battle scenes, and Auguste Taunay, sculptor; Jean-Baptiste Debret, painter, and Charles-Simon Pradier, engraver.

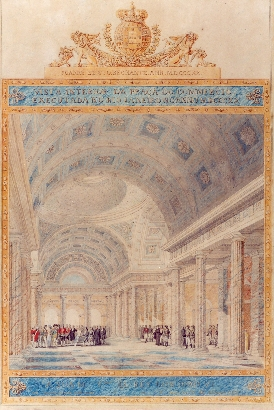
1820 Interior of the Praça do Comércio (Commerce plaza)

Grandjean de Montigny was to live in Rio de Janeiro until his death in 1850. Throughout this period he was the only teacher of Architecture at the Academy of Fine Arts. He designed the Roman Arch (1816) and many other buildings in an eclectic classical style. He designed the building for the Academy of Fine Arts in 1817. Montigny built the Praça do Comércio (exchange), completed in 1820 and later occupied by the customs. (Note: The Praça do Comércio was opened on 13 May 1820 and quickly became an important place for merchants to trade. On 21 April 1821 a crowd staged a protest in the building, which was bloodily suppressed by troops of the future Emperor Pedro I. The building was closed, then reopened as the customs house in 1824. It was listed by the Department of National Historical and Artistic Heritage in 1938, by which time it was being used as a warehouse and fast deteriorating. From 1956 to 1978 it was used as a courthouse. In the 1980s it was restored, and opened as a cultural center on 29 March 1990.) This is now the Casa França-Brasil, a cultural center.

Grandjean de Montigny made innovative proposals for redeveloping Rio de Janeiro in 1824-25 and in 1827. He designed official and private buildings, including residences in Rio de Janeiro in the Passeio, Mariz e Barros, Haddock Lobo and Catumbi streets. Other buildings included the Royal College of Science, Arts and Crafts and the Candelaria market. He converted the Seminário São Joaquim for use as the Colégio Pedro II. In 1829 he was responsible for all the decorations for the festival celebrating the marriage of the Emperor Pedro I of Brazil and the Empress Amélie of Leuchtenberg. In 1848 he was charged with design of the Imperial Palace and the Senate.

Auguste-Henri-Victor Grandjean de Montigny died in Rio de Janeiro in the spring of 1850.

== Works ==
- Montigny, Auguste Grandjean de; Famin, Auguste (1806). Architecture toscane: palais, maisons, églises et autres édifices publics et privés principalement des 15e, 16e et 17e siècles. Large folio, 72 plates. In 1837 a small folio edition was published with 109 plates. Paris: P. Didot l'ainé.
- Montigny, Auguste Grandjean de (1813). Recueil des Plus Beaux Tombeaux exécutés en Italie dans les XVe et XVIe siècles: D'après les dessins des plus célèbres architectes et sculpteurs. Paris: P. Didot l'aine.
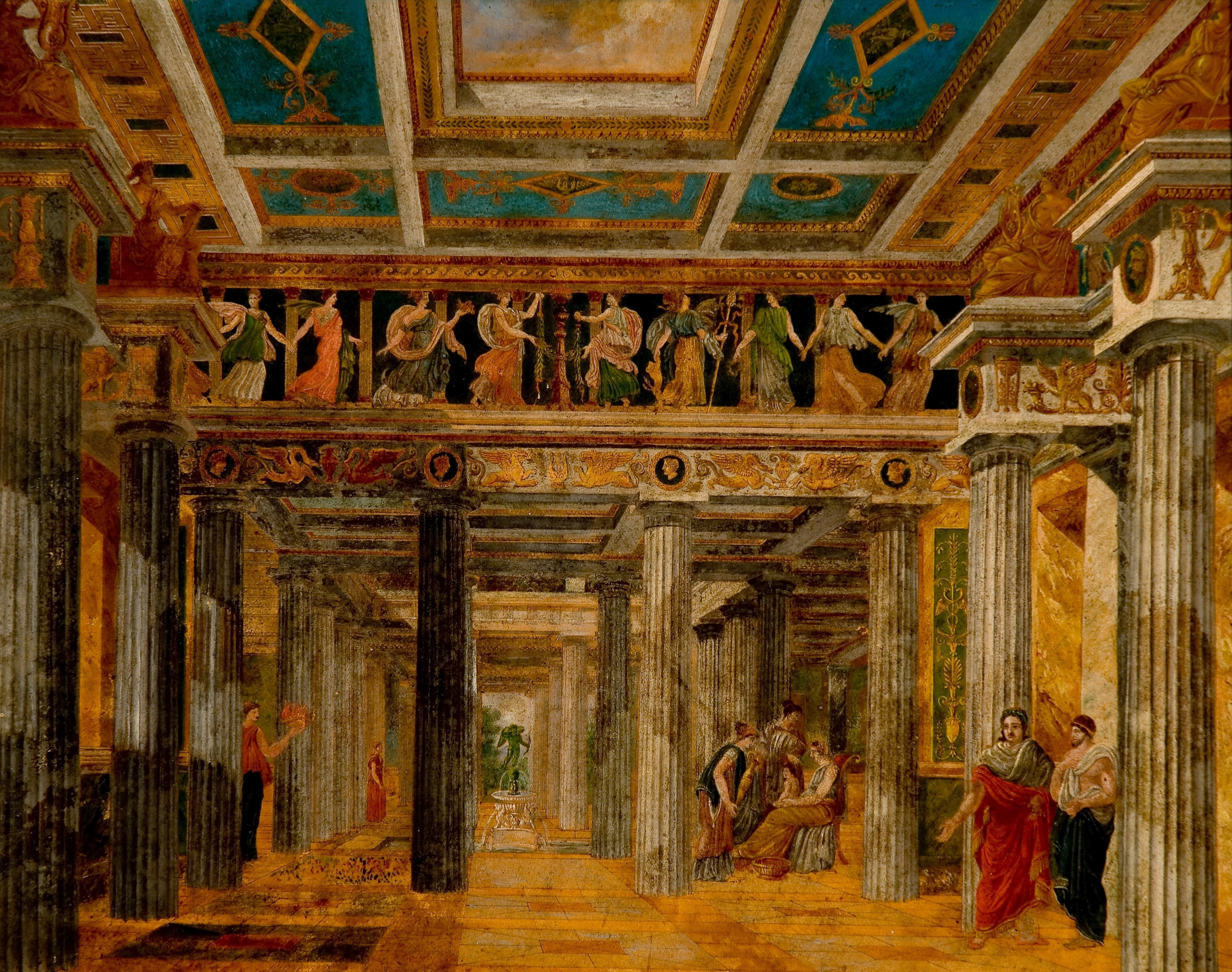
(undated) Roman interior

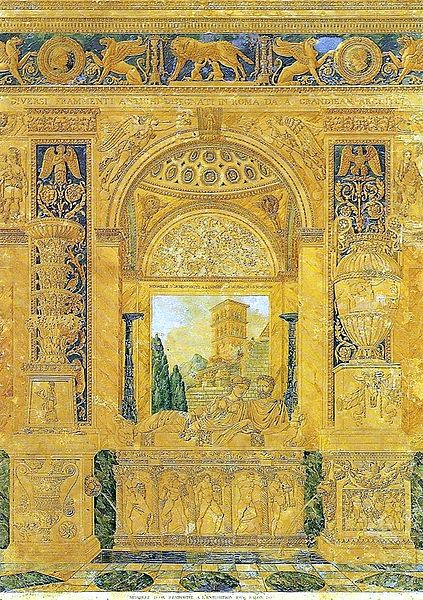
1808 Antique fragments in Rome

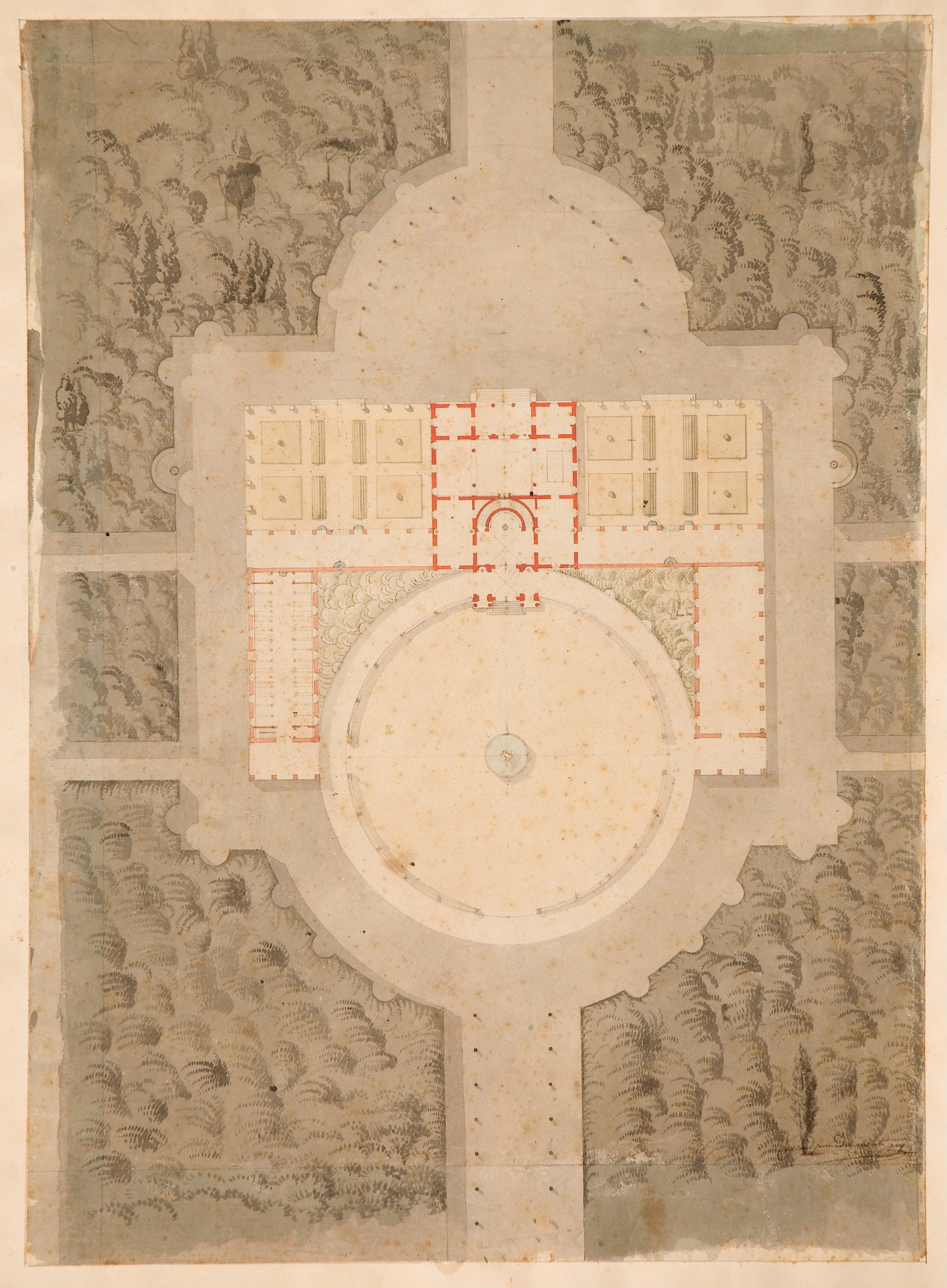
Plan for a palace for Jerome Bonaparte

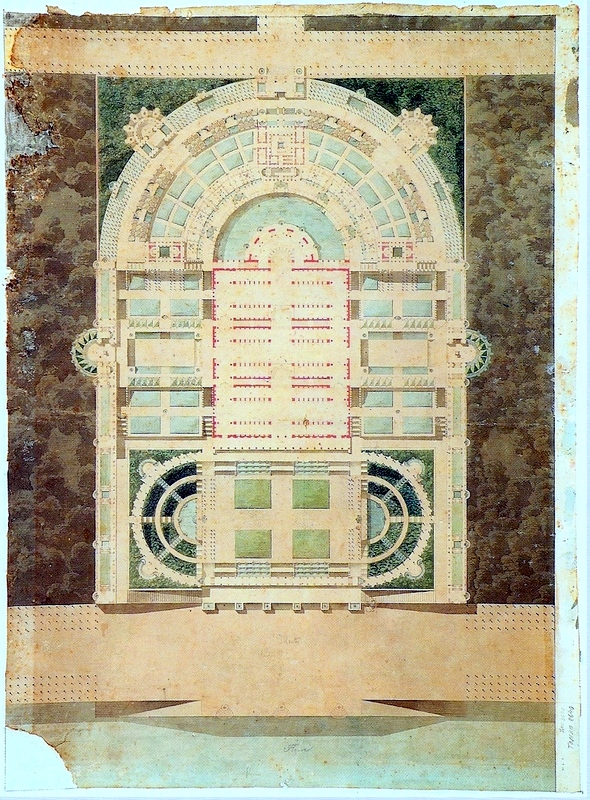
(undated) Plan for a garden with artificial lakes

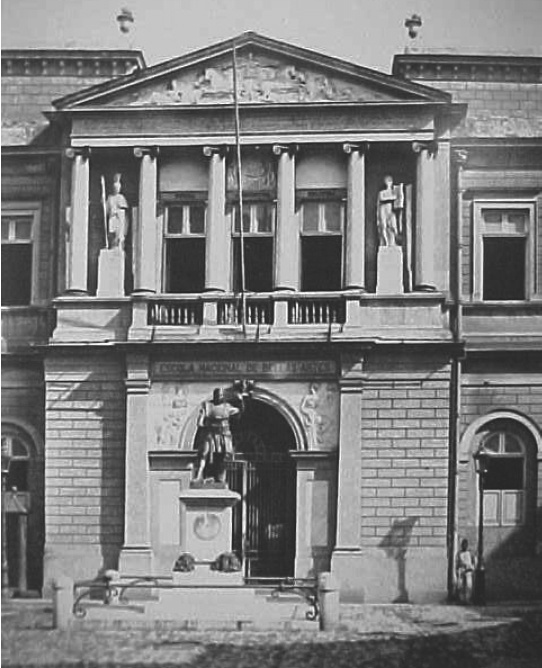
1826 Academy of Art in Rio

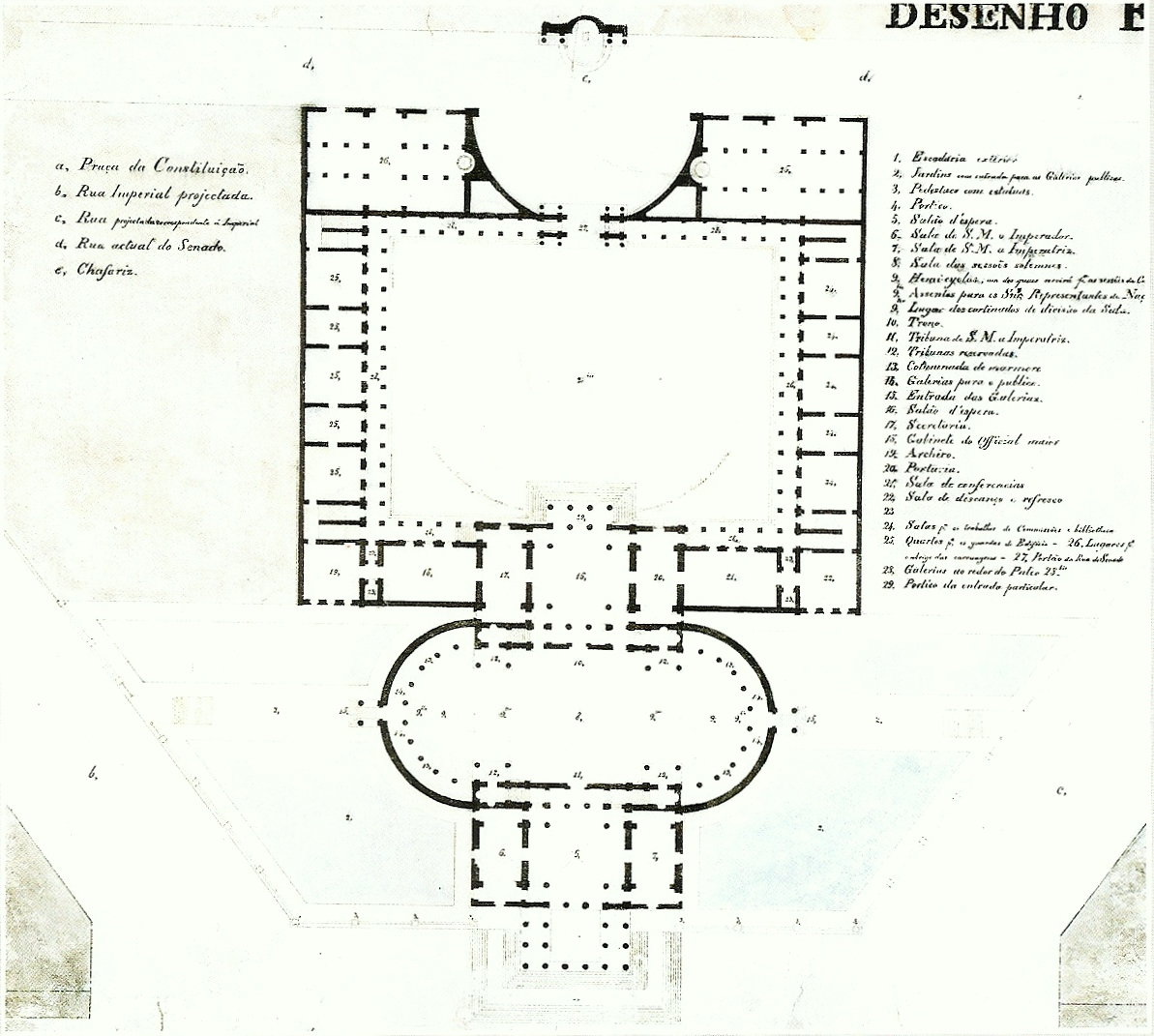
1848 Design for the ground floor of the Senate Palace, Rio

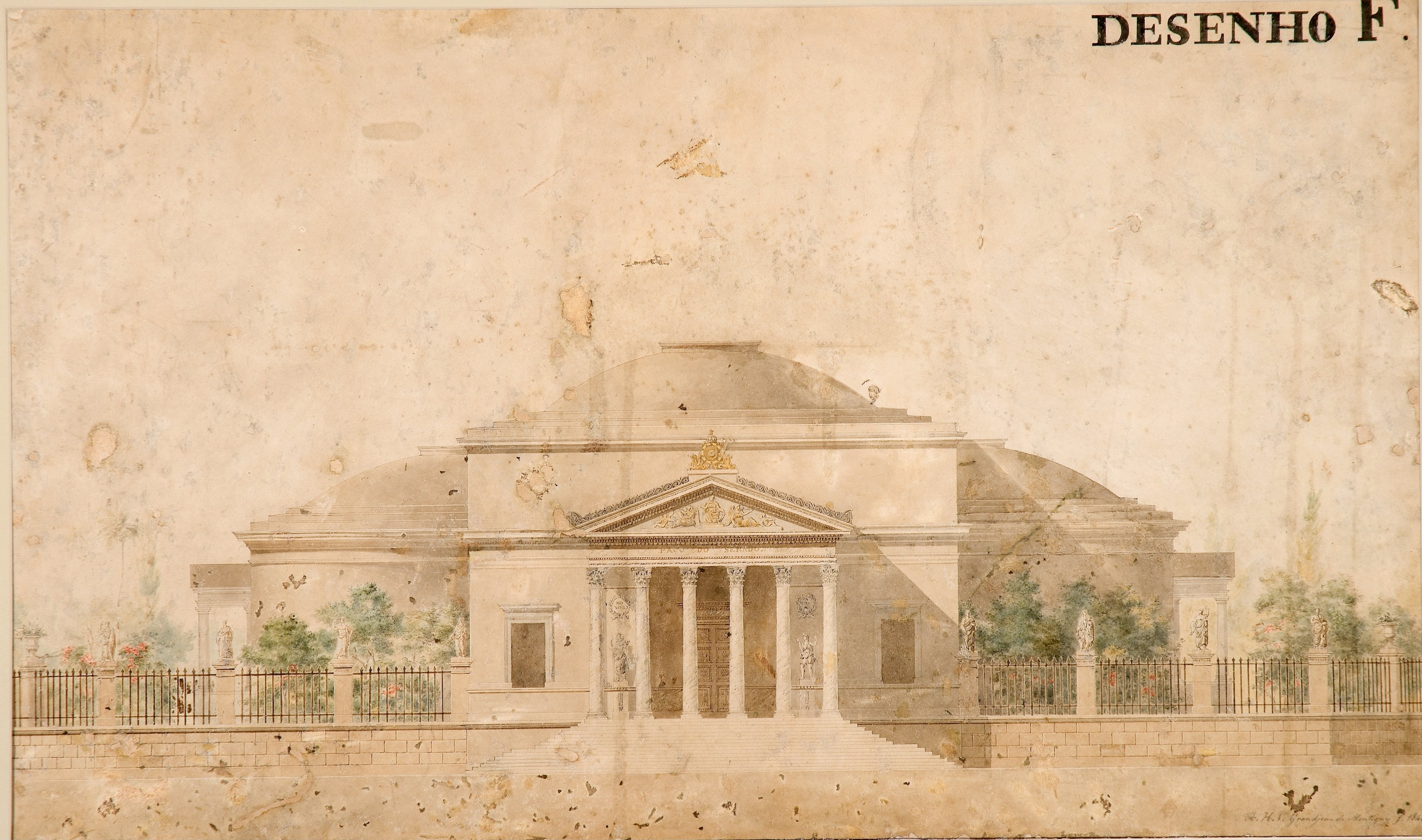
Facade of the Senate Palace, Rio
