= Joachim Lebreton =

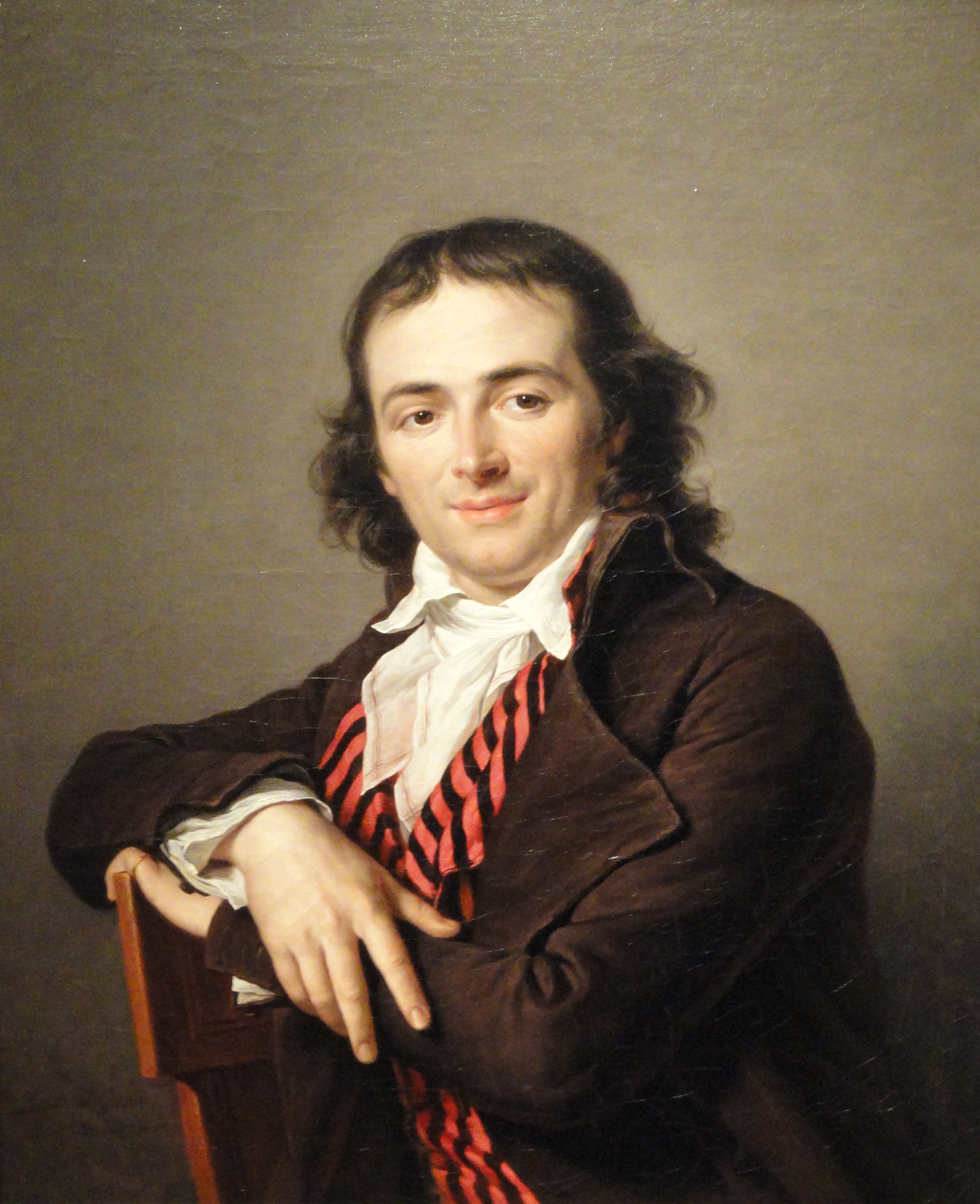
- Portrait of Lebreton, by Adélaïde Labille-Guiard, 1795
- Born: 1760; Saint-Méen-le-Grand, France
- Died: 1819 (aged 58–59); Rio de Janeiro, Brazil
- Occupations: Professor, administrator, legislator
- Awards: Légion d'honneur

Joachim Lebreton (1760–1819) was a French professor, public administrator and legislator.

== Biography ==
Lebreton began his career as professor of Rhetoric at the Collège de Tulle.

He was appointed administrator of Fine Arts of the Ministry of Interior during the French Revolution, at the time of the French Directory. Then, he took part in the 18 Brumaire coup, becoming member of the Revolutionary in the year VIII of the Revolution, a member of Institut de France a society for the propagation of science and the arts, in the year XI, and also a member of Légion d'honneur from the year XII. He later became the secretary of the Institut National, "but resigned in 1815, having opposed the repatriation of works of art looted by Napoleon."

He was removed from office and forced into exile with the European Restoration, coming to get refuge in Brazil under the protection of the Portuguese royal family, who was residing there since 1808.

Lebreton docked in Rio de Janeiro in 1816 and was assigned to lead the Missão Artística Francesa (French Artistic Mission). He died a few years after the arrival of the Missão in Brazil, before their projects to implement a systematic art education, which later resulted in Brazilian academic art, had been fully materialized.

== Personal life ==
Lebreton was married to Anne-Julie d'Arcet (1772–1857). Together, they were the parents of Juliette (née Lebreton) Cloquet (1800–1842).
