= Manuel Dias de Oliveira =

Brazilian painter, decorator and art professor

Portrait of King João VI and Queen Carlota Joaquina, c. 1815

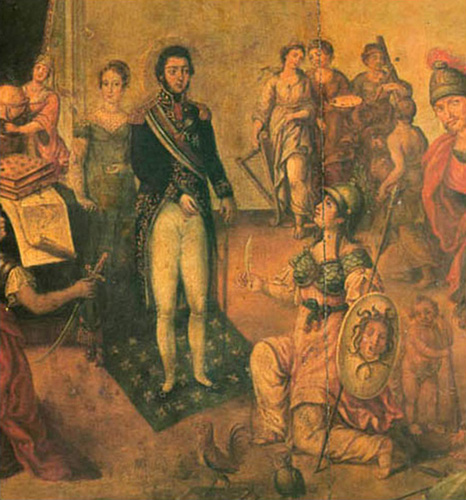
Allegory on the Birth of Maria da Glória (detail)

Manuel Dias de Oliveira (1763/4 – 25 April 1837) was a Brazilian painter, decorator and art professor.

== Biography ==
When he was a young man, he moved to Rio de Janeiro, where he studied toreutics, which suggests that he may have worked as a goldsmith. A Portuguese merchant provided funds for further studies in Porto, but the merchant died, leaving Dias stranded there.

He made his way to Lisbon, where he found refuge at the Casa Pia; an educational institution for young vagabonds, founded by Pina Manique in 1780. The residents were taught skills such as mathematics and drawing, while doing manual labor to pay their way. He proved to be an outstanding student and was sent to Rome to further improve his talents.

Thanks to Manique's personal support, he was able to enter the Accademia di San Luca, where he was one of Pompeo Batoni's last students. He remained in Italy until 1800, when he returned to Portugal. Once there, he was immediately approached with a proposal to establish a new art school in Brazil. He accepted and the "Aula Régia de Desenho e Figura" was opened in Rio de Janeiro later that year.

It was the first formal art school in the colony. He followed the European style of teaching, which included the use of nude models; a controversial innovation at that time. His best known student is Francisco Pedro do Amaral a fellow Brazilian painter. He also worked as a decorator for special events; notably the visit of the Portuguese Royal Family in 1808.

After the arrival of the French Artistic Mission in 1816, his prestige declined. In 1822, Emperor Pedro I withdrew his support, in favor of the new Imperial Academy of Fine Arts. Dias was not offered a position there so, after almost a decade of being a free-lance artist, he moved to Campos de Goytacazes and operated a regular elementary school until his death. The majority of his works were of an ephemeral nature and have not survived.
