= Simplício Rodrigues de Sá =

Portuguese painter and art teacher (1785-1839)

- Born: Simplício João Rodrigues de Sá; 1785; São Nicolau Tolentino, Santiago, Portuguese Cape Verde
- Died: 9 March 1839 (aged 53-54); Rio de Janeiro, Empire of Brazil
- Known for: Painting, drawing
- Notable work: Last portrait of Pedro I of Brazil
- Awards: Order of Christ; Order of the Southern Cross

Signature
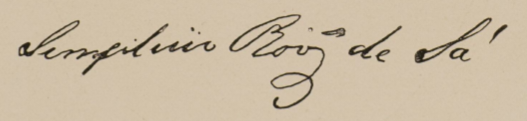

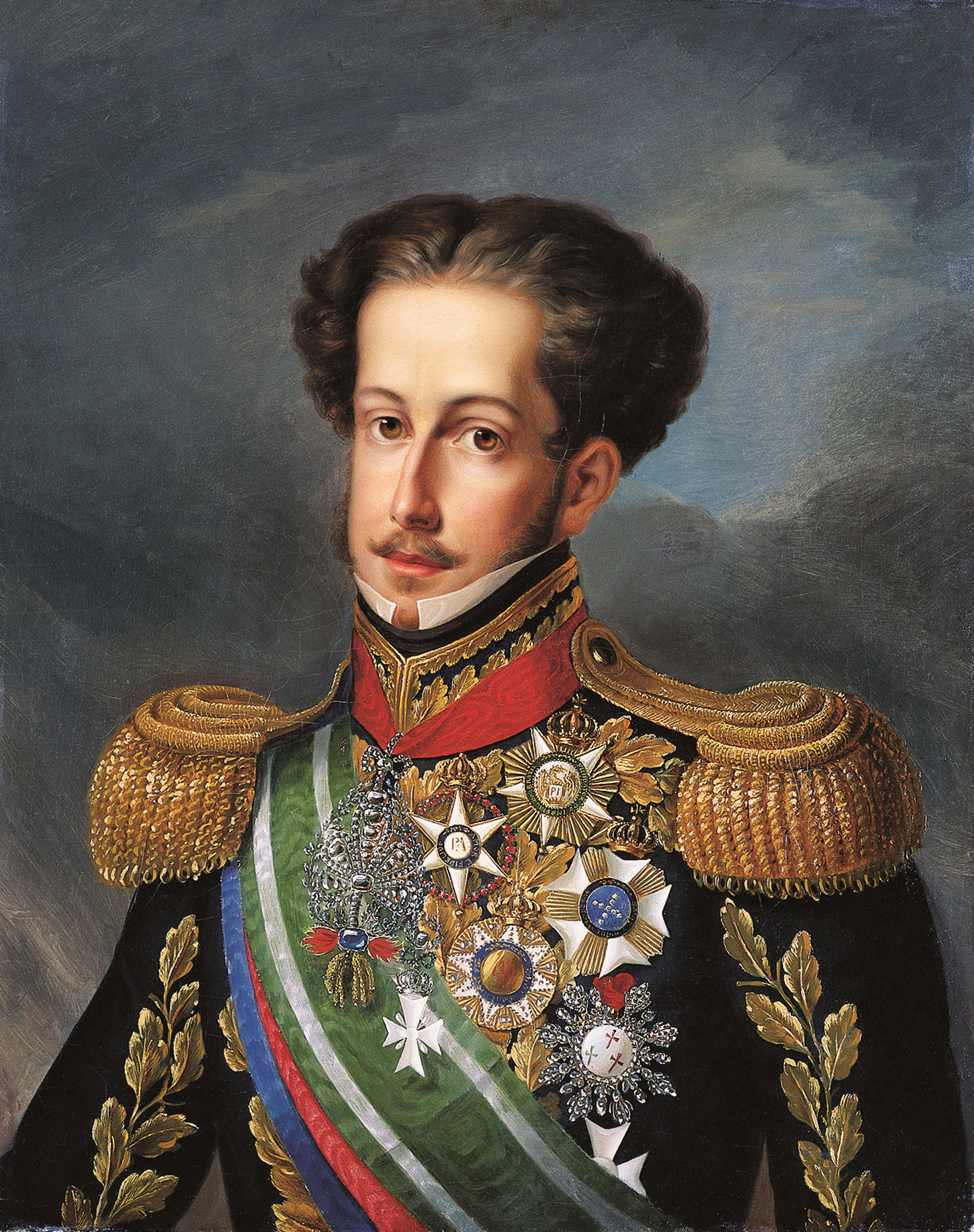
Pedro I of Brazil, often described as the last portrait made of the emperor during his lifetime

Simplício Rodrigues de Sá (1785 – 9 March 1839) was a Portuguese painter and art teacher, born in present day Cape Verde, who spent most of his life and career in Brazil. He was a pupil of Jean-Baptiste Debret and took part in the formation of the Imperial Academy of Fine Arts. He was one of the few Portuguese artists who worked actively in the orbit of the French Artistic Mission in Brazil. At the Imperial Academy, he taught drawing and temporarily held the chair of history painting.

Rodrigues de Sá worked closely with the Brazilian imperial family. He taught drawing and painting to Pedro II, Maria da Glória, the future queen of Portugal, and Empress Maria Leopoldina. His best-known work is the last portrait made of Pedro I while the emperor was still alive.

He is the patron of the 33rd chair of the Brazilian Academy of Fine Arts.

== Biography ==
=== Early life ===
Simplício João Rodrigues de Sá was born in São Nicolau Tolentino, on the island of Santiago in Portuguese Cape Verde, in 1785; his exact date of birth is unknown and his baptismal name may have been Simplício João Rodrigues de Brito. His parents were João Rois de Brito and Margarida Rosa de Araújo; "Rois" is believed to be an abbreviation of Rodrigues, which may explain the later variation in one of his last names.

Simplício was sent to Lisbon in 1794 and entered the Real Casa Pia de Lisboa the following year. In 1809 he moves to Rio de Janeiro, where the first records of his work as a portrait painter dates back to 1812. In 1815 he briefly moves to Buenos Aires, where he advertises his services of commissioned portraits in oil. In 1817, he marries Norberta Máxima de Jesus. The couple had four children.

=== Imperial Academy of Fine Arts ===
By November 1820 he had returned to Rio de Janeiro, where he was appointed a pensioned student of drawing and painting at the newly created, but not yet inaugurated, Imperial Academy of Fine Arts, with an annual salary of 300,000 réis.

By August 1822, his home and studio in Rio de Janeiro were at Rua do Fogo, where he took portrait commissions and gave private lessons in drawing and painting.

In the second half of 1823, Jean-Baptiste Debret grew tired of waiting for the repeatedly delayed opening of the Academy of Fine Arts, so he rented a house in central Rio de Janeiro and formed a group of students, his first class, to teach painting techniques. Among his first pupils were Simplício Rodrigues de Sá, Francisco Pedro do Amaral, José de Cristo Moreira, Francisco de Sousa Lobo and José da Silva Arruda. The group later grew to include Manuel de Araújo Porto-Alegre, Augusto Müller, Guilherme Müller, José Reis de Carvalho, Afonso Augusto Falcoz and José Correia de Lima.

In 1826, Emperor Pedro I formally opened the Imperial Academy of Fine Arts, with classes beginning in 1827 in a new building on the present-day Praça Tiradentes. The academy then entered a period of formal study and technical refinement in painting. Its first collective exhibition of teachers and students lasted twelve days and drew more than 2,000 visitors. Rodrigues de Sá exhibited several life-size portrait busts; his presence was notable within Debret's immediate exhibition circle because he was Portuguese-born rather than French or Brazilian-born.

Debret returned to France in 1831, and Rodrigues de Sá temporarily took over the chair of history painting at the academy. He held the position until the appointment of Araújo Porto-Alegre later that year. In 1834, after the death of Henrique José da Silva, Rodrigues de Sá became professor of drawing.

=== Imperial family ===
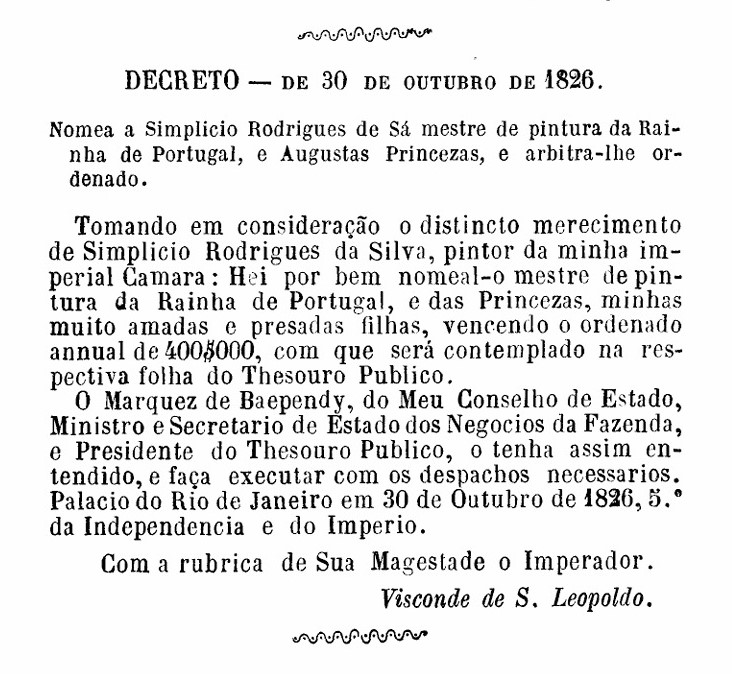
Imperial appointment of the painter Simplício Rodrigues de Sá in 1826

Simplício was appointed painter to the Imperial House of Brazil and became art teacher to Princess Maria da Glória, the future queen of Portugal, under a decree of 30 October 1826.

He also accepted a religious commission, painting a Last Supper for the chapel of the Church of the Third Order of Saint Francis of Penance in Rio de Janeiro.

Rodrigues de Sá became one of the imperial family's portraitists, producing several paintings of Pedro I, his wife and his children. Between 1833 and 1835, he was chosen as drawing teacher to Pedro II and his sisters. His appointment drew on his reputation for character and feeling as well as skill. By 1835, illness had begun to limit his work at court. Félix Taunay offered to take over Sá's teaching duties for Pedro II and his sisters without taking the salary attached to the post, so that the pay would continue to go to Rodrigues de Sá. The Marquis of Itanhaém, tutor to the imperial princesses, accepted the arrangement on 1 January 1835. He also taught drawing and painting to Empress Maria Leopoldina. His continued presence as a teacher to the imperial family shows the strength of his position in Rio de Janeiro's artistic world.

For his work, Pedro I granted him the habit of the Order of Christ on 27 June 1826 and made him a knight of the Imperial Order of the Cross on 12 October 1827. The documents are held by the National Archives of Brazil.

Rodrigues de Sá painted several portraits of Pedro I and members of the imperial family. His principal work became known as the last portrait made of Pedro I during the emperor's lifetime.

Rodrigues de Sá died blind in Rio de Janeiro on 9 March 1839.

== Style and reception ==
Rodrigues de Sá was a pupil of Debret, chiefly a portraitist, praised as a "sound draftsman and an excellent colorist". His better-known works include those of Pedro I, held by the Museu Imperial in Petrópolis, which was highly praised by Debret; the Marquis of Inhambupe, held by the Museu Nacional de Belas Artes; and Francisco Gomes da Silva, the Chalaça, held by the National Historical Museum of Brazil. He also painted religious subjects, including the Last Supper for the Church of the Third Order of Saint Francis of Penance in Rio de Janeiro, and genre subjects, including Irmão Pedinte in the Museu Nacional de Belas Artes. Works such as the portrait of the Count of Rio Pardo, in the Museu Imperial, show the technical assurance of his neoclassical painting.

Nossa Senhora da Conceição was a religious painting of the kind commonly commissioned for churches and private oratories, outside the portrait work for which Rodrigues de Sá was best known. Although conventional in composition, the work has been valued for its pigmentation and visual presence.

Gonzaga Duque described Rodrigues de Sá's full-length, life-size portrait of the benefactor Antônio Rodrigues dos Santos, who is shown standing and leaning over a tall writing desk while looking out of the canvas. Duque found considerable vigor in the colors, while also noting false-looking touches of reddish paint in the head.

In comparison with some Portuguese and Brazilian contemporaries, Rodrigues de Sá followed a more secular path in his work. His Last Supper, painted for the chapel of the Third Order of Saint Francis of Penance in Rio de Janeiro, is small, conventional and stiff, remaining within a tradition that had lost much of its force.

== Works ==
Several works by or after Rodrigues de Sá are associated with the Museu Imperial in Petrópolis, including portraits of Pedro I, Maria da Glória, the Count of Rio Pardo and Pedro II. One surviving example is Retrato do conde do Rio Pardo, an 1830 oil on canvas measuring 113 cm × 71 cm (44 in × 28 in), now in the Tobias do Rego Monteiro collection. Another is an engraved portrait of Pedro I, made by Edward Smith in 1827 after a painting Rodrigues de Sá had completed the previous year.

Around 1830, Rodrigues de Sá painted a small group of portraits of the daughters of Pedro I and Empress Leopoldina. The Museu Nacional de Arte Antiga in Lisbon holds portraits of Princess Januária, Princess Paula and Princess Francisca. Related portraits of the three princesses, signed and dated 1831, are held by the Oliveira Lima Library in Washington, D.C.

The National Historical Museum holds O Chalaça, a portrait of Francisco Gomes da Silva, oil on canvas, measuring 31 cm × 25 cm (12.2 in × 9.8 in).

His painting Irmão Pedinte ("Begging Friar") was shown in the Religious Painting Exhibition at the Museu Nacional de Belas Artes in Rio de Janeiro in 1943. The painting belongs to the museum's collection. Reis Júnior described Irmão Pedinte as a small canvas with dense handling and firm, assured drawing.

=== Gallery ===
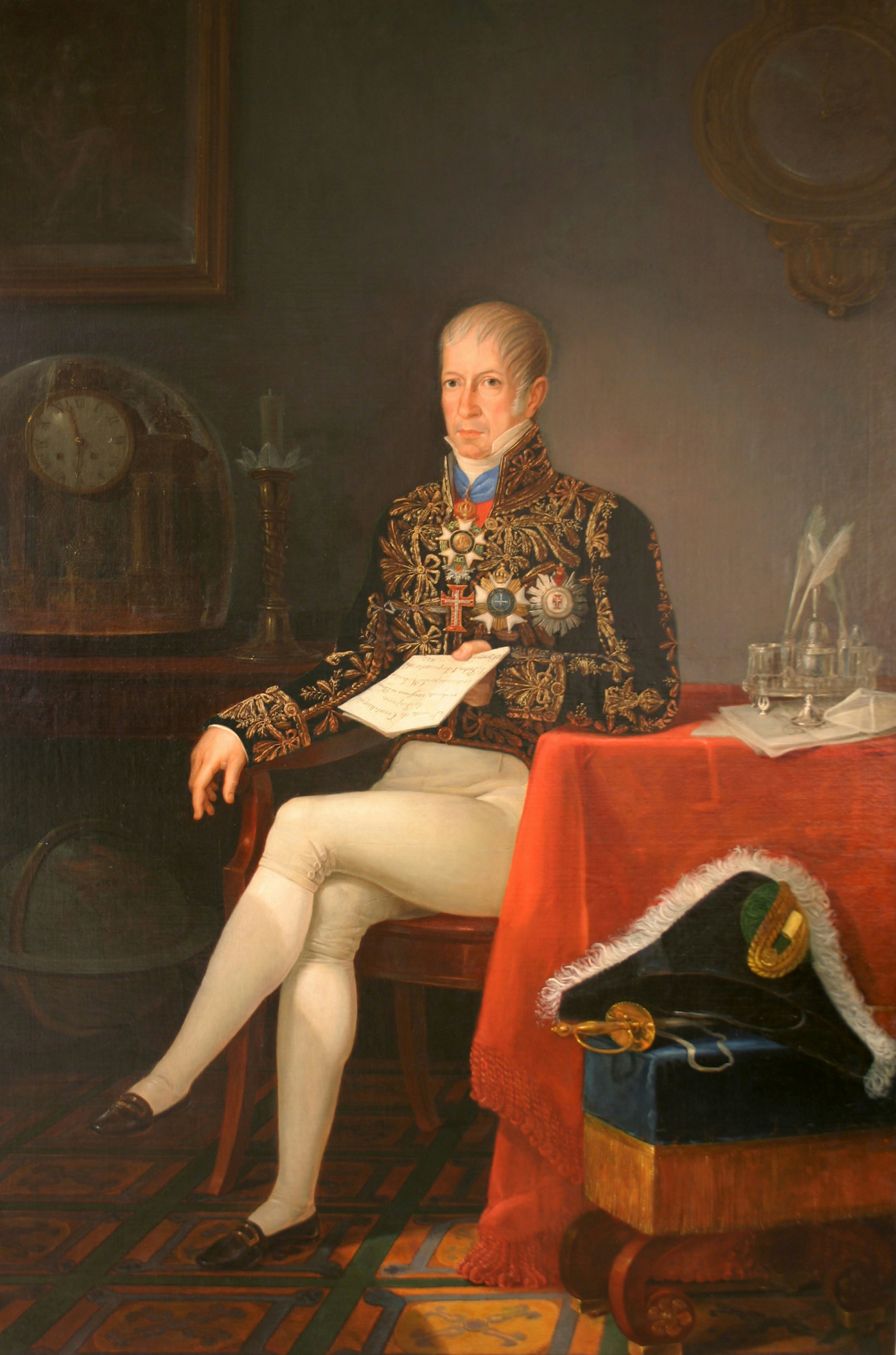
Marquis of Inhambupe, oil on canvas, 1825, 198 cm × 131 cm (78 in × 52 in). Collection of the Museu Nacional de Belas Artes.

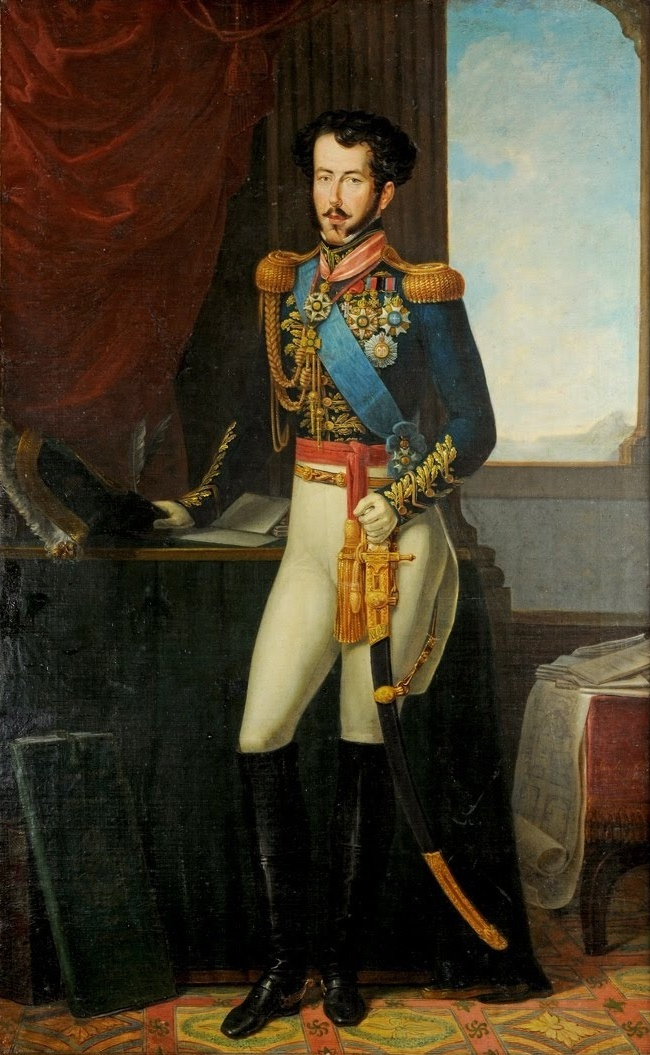
Count of Rio Pardo, oil on canvas, 1830, 113 cm × 71 cm (44 in × 28 in). Collection of the Museu Imperial.

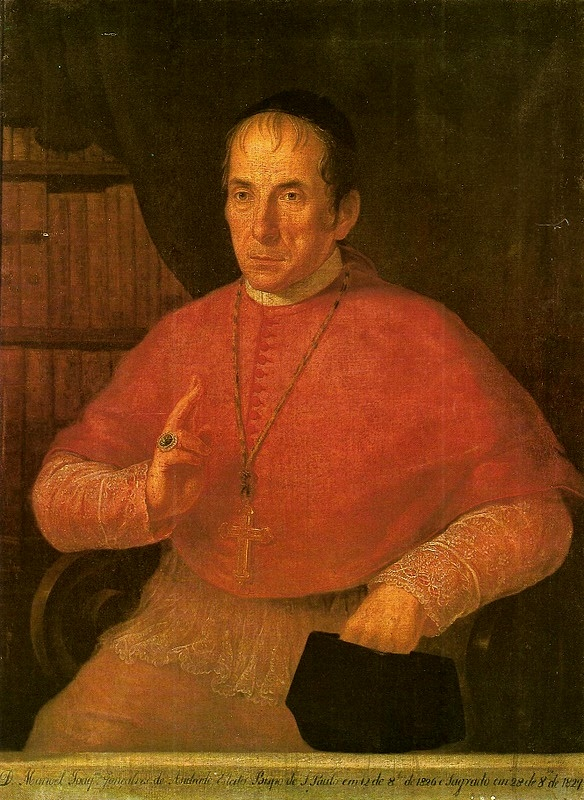
Gonçalves de Andrade, 5th Bishop of São Paulo, oil on canvas, 1828. Collection of the Museum of Sacred Art of São Paulo.

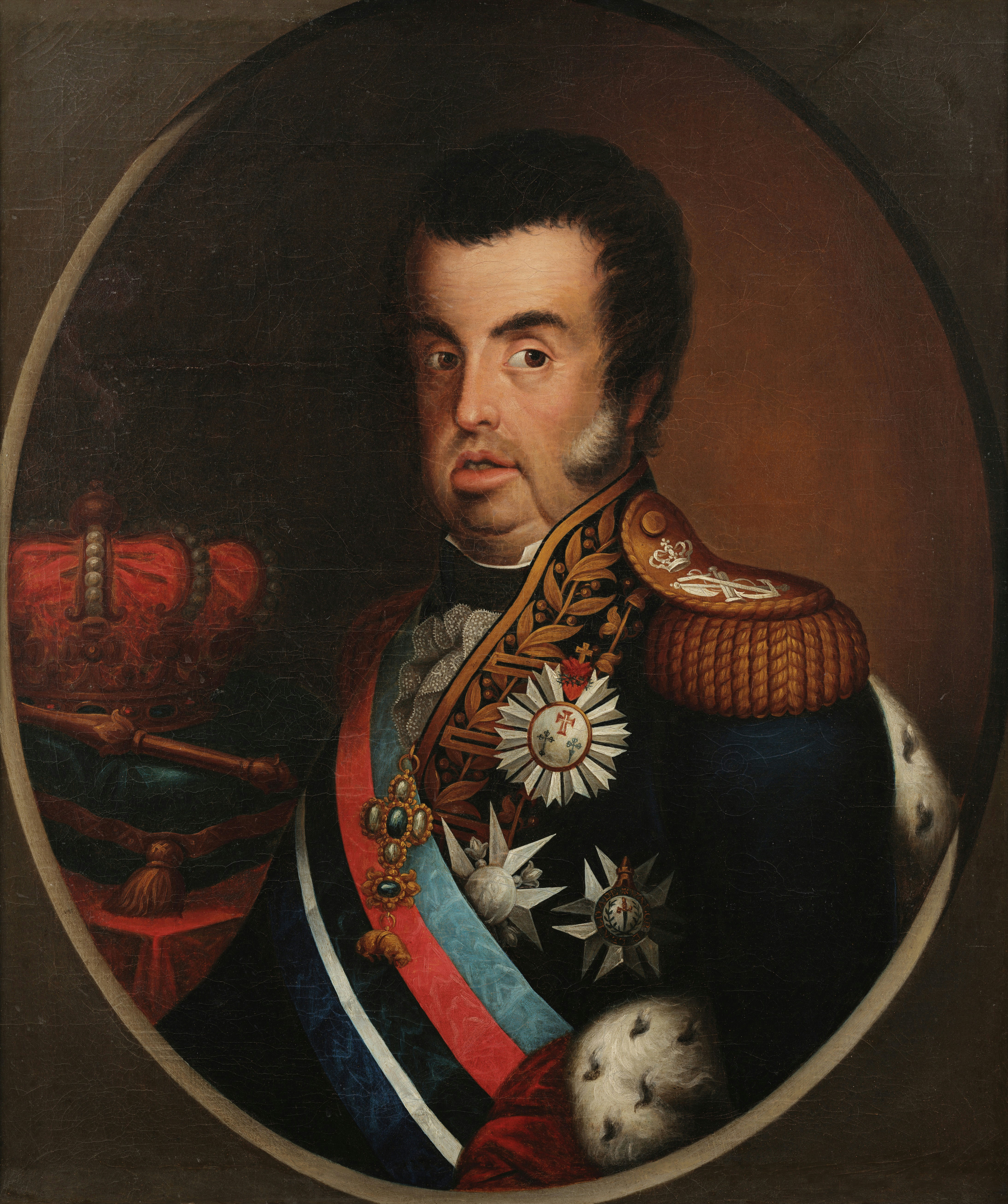
Portrait of John VI of Portugal

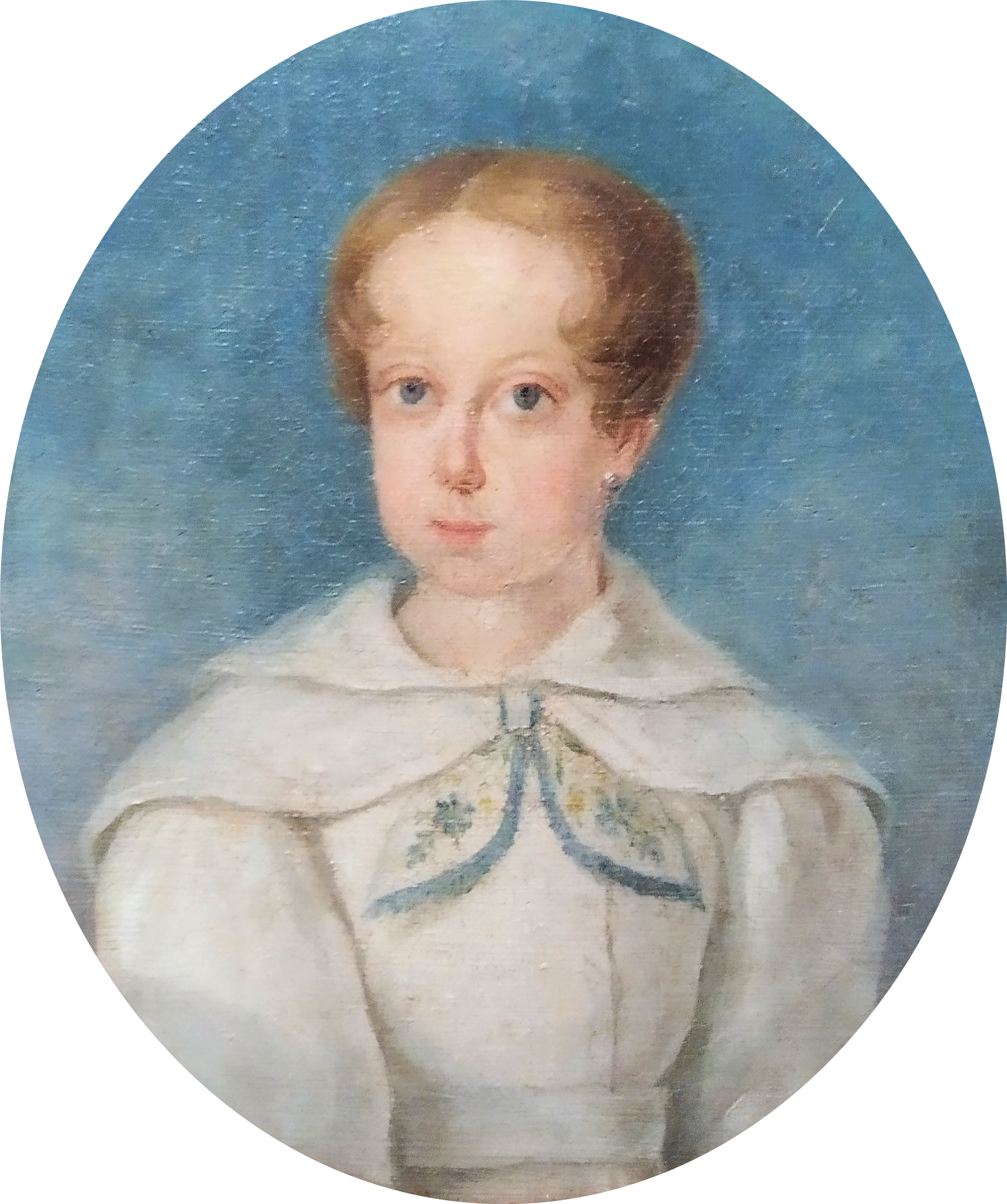
Princess Paula of Braganza, attributed to Rodrigues de Sá, c. 1830. Collection of the Museu Nacional de Arte Antiga, Lisbon.

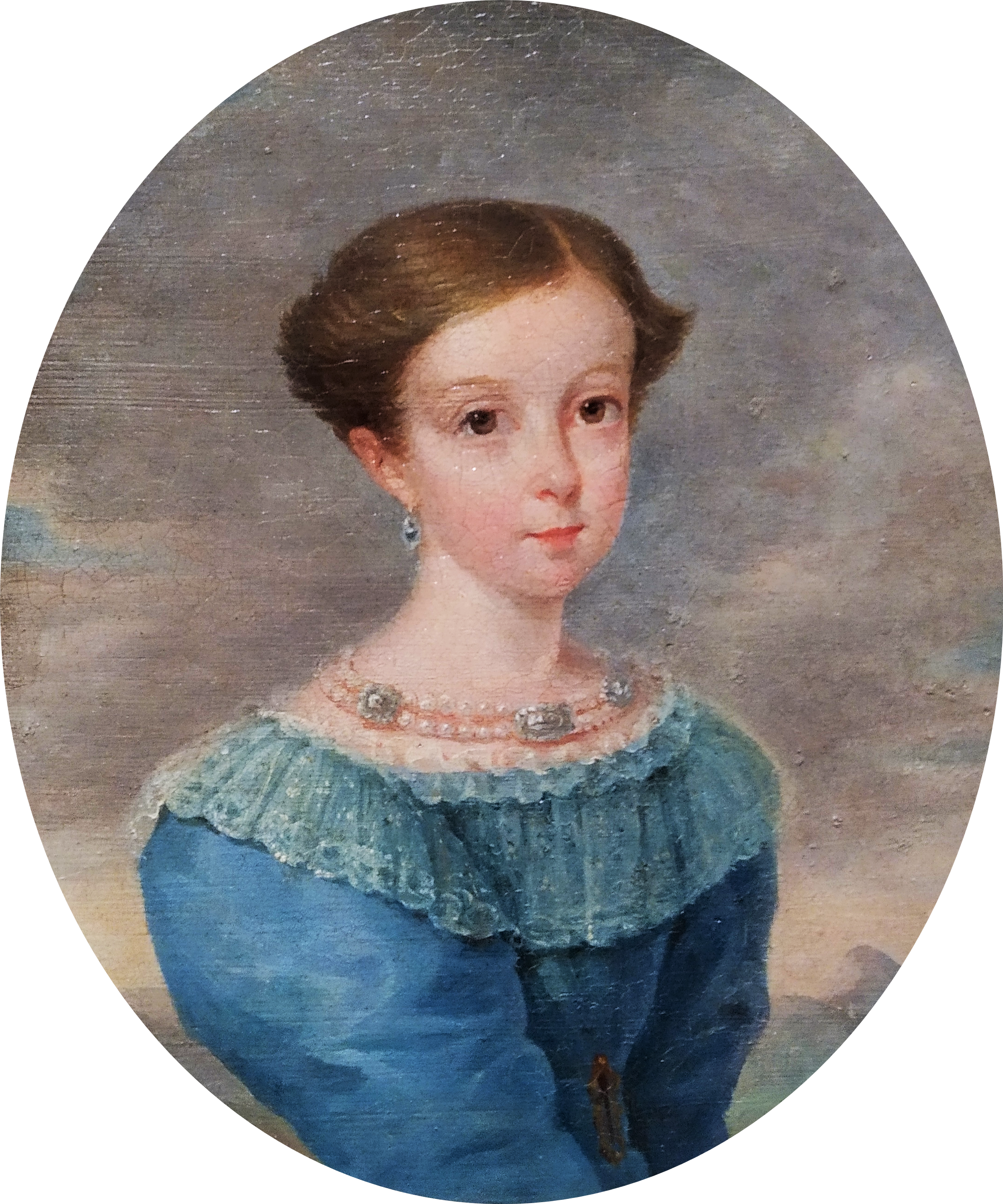
Princess Francisca of Braganza, attributed to Rodrigues de Sá, c. 1830. Collection of the Museu Nacional de Arte Antiga, Lisbon.

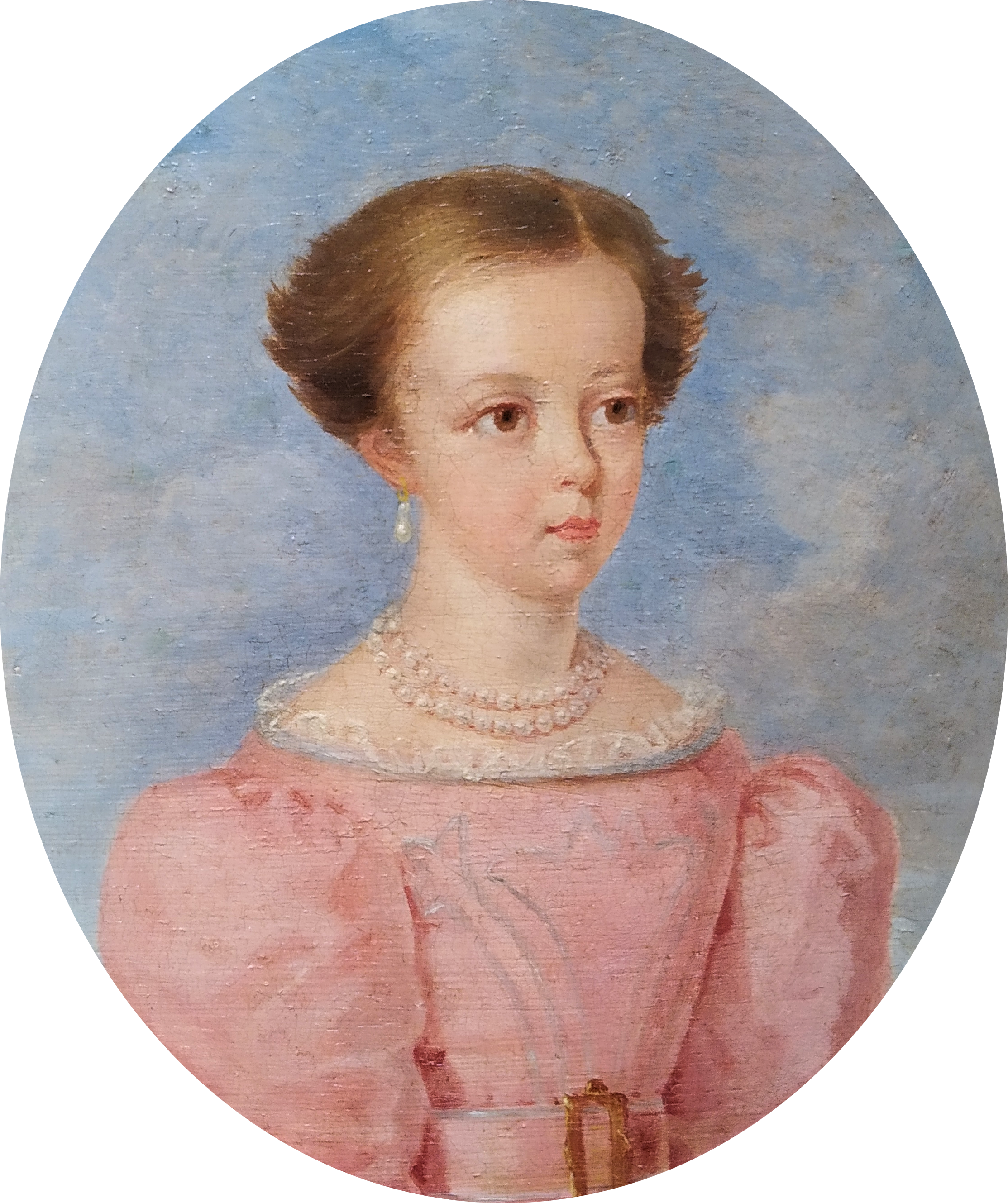
Princess Januária of Braganza, attributed to Rodrigues de Sá, c. 1830. Collection of the Museu Nacional de Arte Antiga, Lisbon.

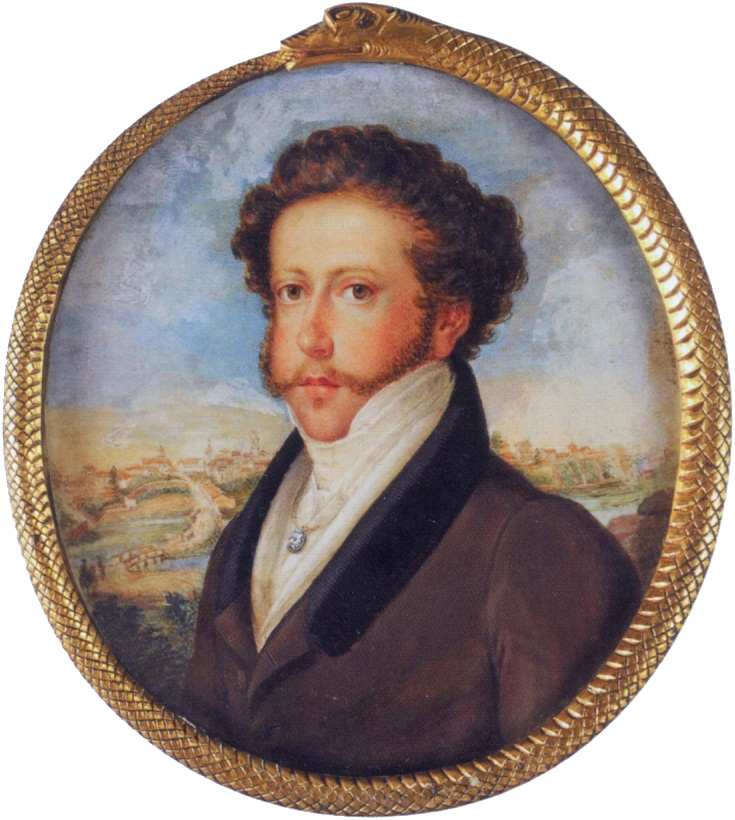
Pedro, Prince Royal of Portugal, later Pedro I of Brazil, in São Paulo, 1822

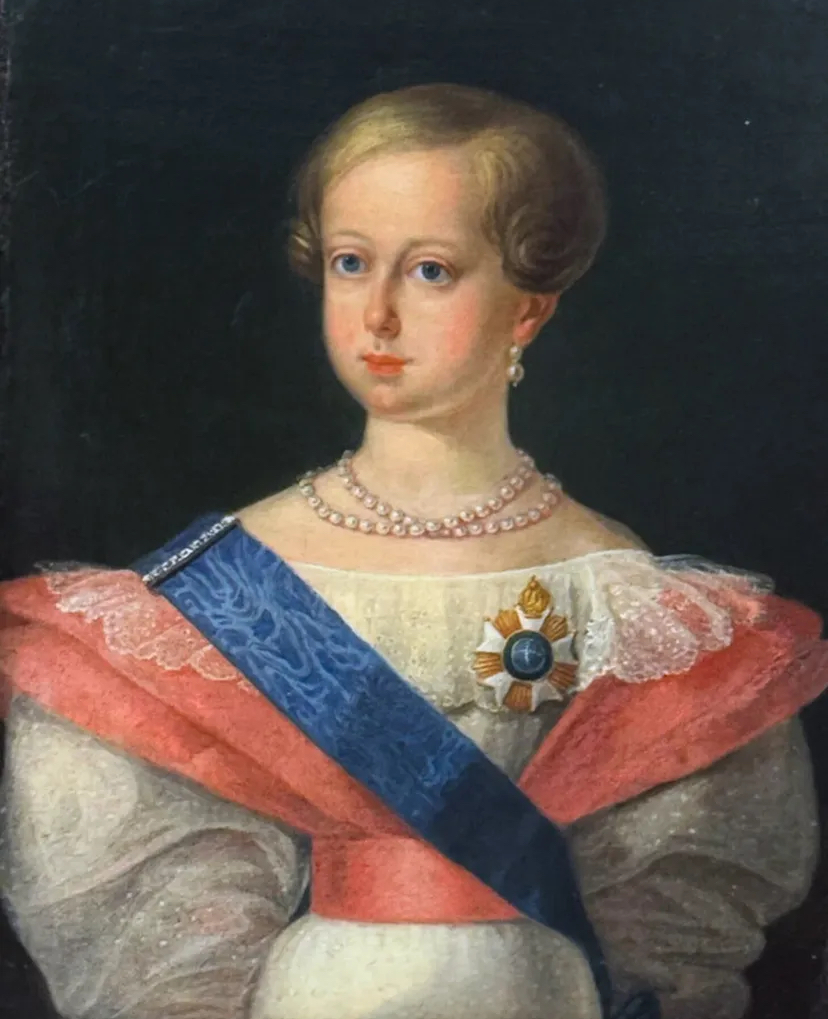
Princess Paula Mariana of Brazil, 1831. Collection of the Oliveira Lima Library, Catholic University of America.

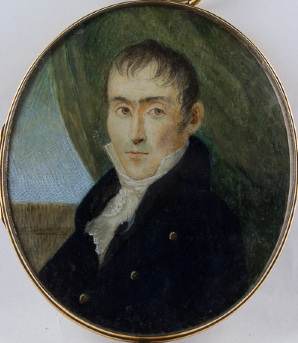
Hipólito Vieytes, watercolor on ivory, 1815. Collection of the National Historical Museum of Argentina.

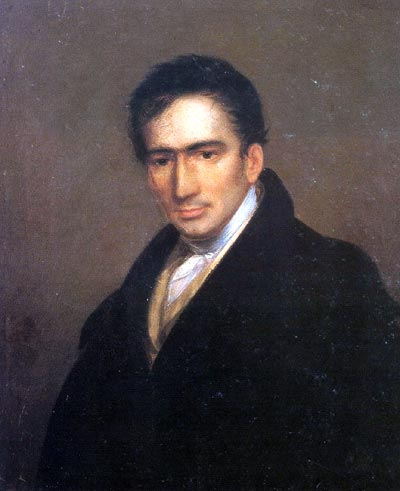
Francisco Gomes da Silva, known as the Chalaça. Collection of the National Historical Museum, Rio de Janeiro.
