= Francisco Pedro do Amaral =

Brazilian painter, designer, scenographer and gilder

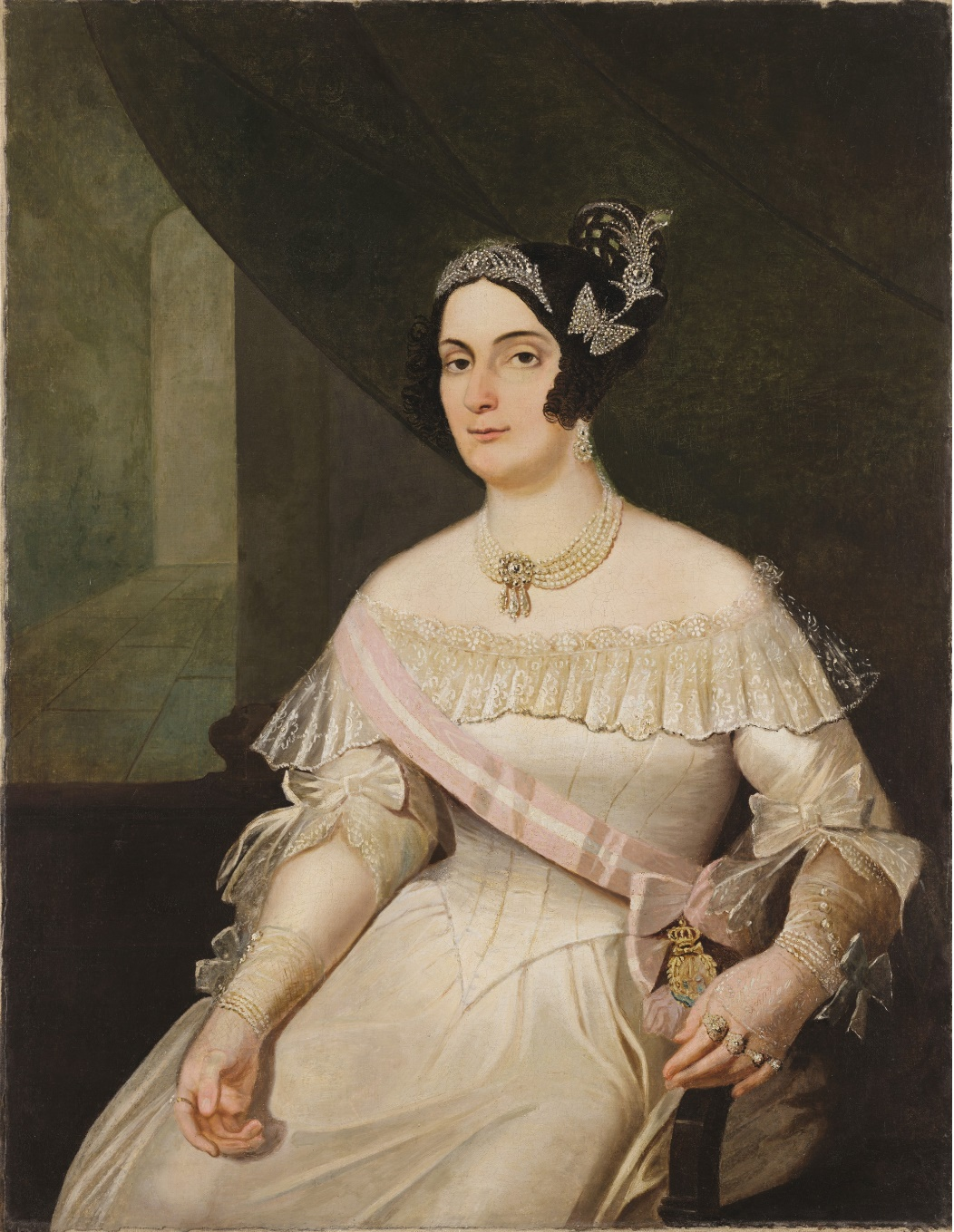
Portrait of Domitila de Castro, Marchioness of Santos.

Francisco Pedro do Amaral (c. 1790 – 10 November 1831) was a Brazilian painter, designer, scenographer and gilder.

== Biography ==
It is believed that he took his first lessons with José Leandro de Carvalho (1770-1834) then, in 1807, enrolled at the "Aula Régia de Desenho e Figura", under the direction of Manuel Dias de Oliveira. After graduating, he applied for a teaching position there, but was not accepted. Instead, he found employment as chief assistant to a stage designer named Manoel da Costa at the Real Teatro de São João (now the Teatro João Caetano), but quit after a major disagreement. He then worked for an architect until his former teacher Carvalho invited him to work at the Paço Imperial, which began his career as a decorator.

When Jean-Baptiste Debret arrived with the French Artistic Mission, Amaral and a Portuguese-immigrant painter, Simplício de Sá, became two of his first students. After the establishment of the Academia Imperial de Belas Artes, Amaral was commissioned to provide decorations for the Biblioteca Nacional (which, at that time, was located in the Carmo Convent), and the Paço de São Cristóvão, where he worked until 1829. He also designed decorations for festivals and experimented with new processes for lithography. In 1827, he founded the "Sociedade de São Lucas"; a painter's association modeled after the French Académie de Saint-Luc.

In 1830, he returned to the Paço de São Cristóvão to decorate the coaches that were to be used for the Nuptial Mass of Emperor Pedro I and Amélie of Leuchtenberg. After completing the work, he fell ill and died the following month, possibly from tuberculosis. He never married, but may have had children and was apparently quite wealthy.

Few of his works have survived. Among the most notable are the above-mentioned coaches (now at the Imperial Museum of Brazil) and allegorical panels depicting the four continents, in the Museu do Primeiro Reinado (formerly the "Palacete do Caminho Novo"). A street in the Jaguaré District of São Paulo is named after him.

== Allegories of the Four Continents ==
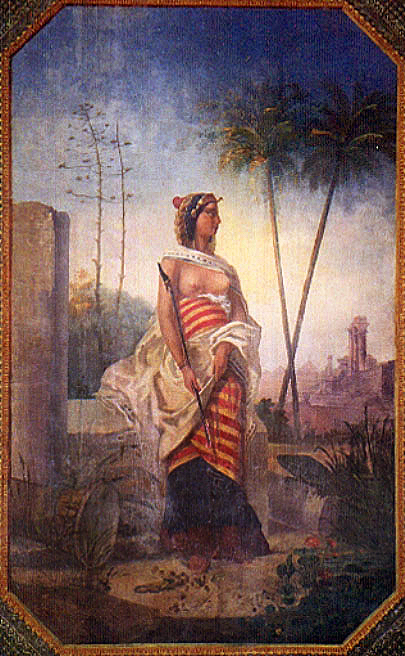
Africa

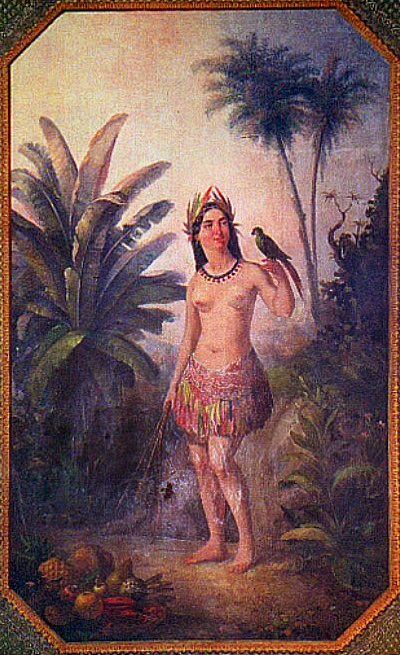
America

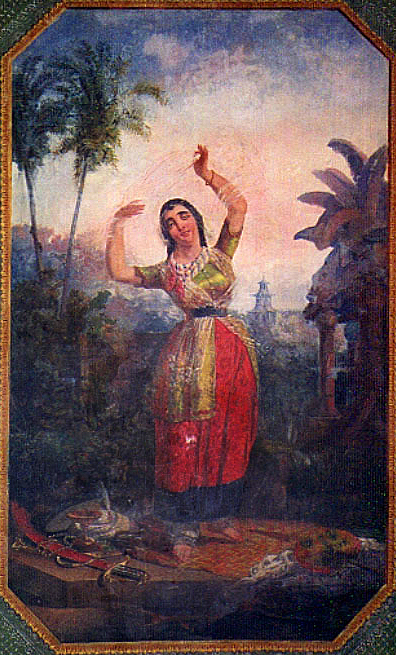
Asia

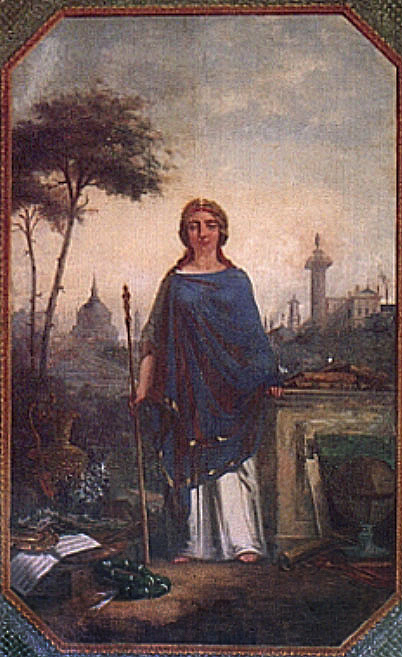
Europe
