= Francisco Gomes da Silva =

Portuguese politician and confidant of Pedro I

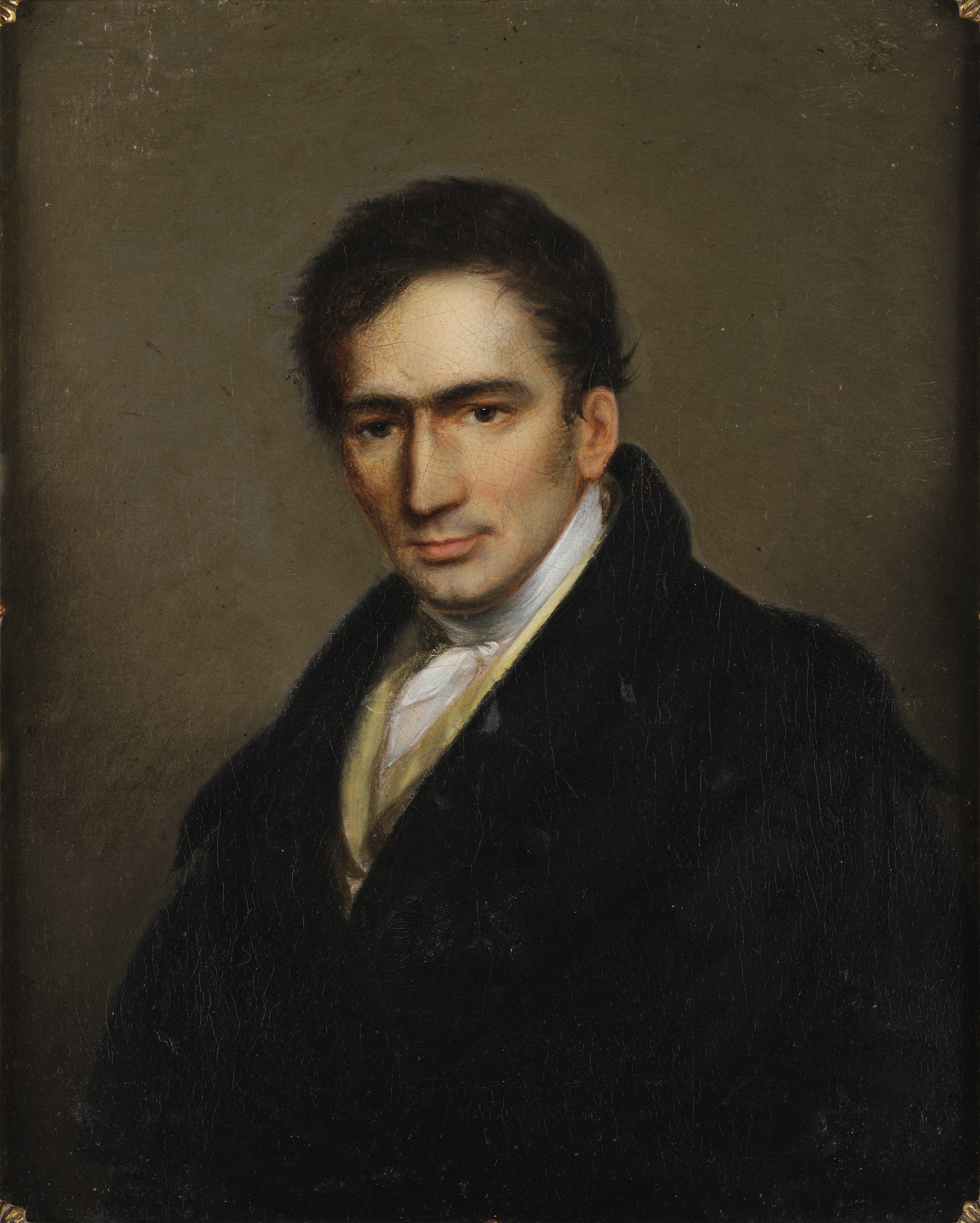
- Portrait by Simplício Rodrigues de Sá, c. 1820–1830
- Born: 22 September 1791; Lisbon, Portugal
- Died: 30 December 1852 (aged 61); Lisbon, Portugal
- Parents: D. Francisco José Rufino de Sousa Lobato, Baron of Vila Nova da Rainha (father); Maria da Conceição Alves (mother)

Francisco Gomes da Silva (22 September 1791 – 30 December 1852), nicknamed the Chalaça (Portuguese pronunciation: [ʃɐlasɐ]; meaning "joker" or "buffoon"), was a Portuguese politician, private secretary and confidant of the first Brazilian emperor, Pedro I.

== Life ==
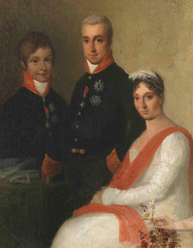
His father (center), detail of Retrato da Família do 1.º Visconde de Santarém by Domingos Sequeira, 1816

Francisco Gomes da Silva was born in Lisbon, the illegitimate son of the nobleman D. Francisco José Rufino de Sousa Lobato, the Baron and later Viscount of Vila Nova da Rainha, with Maria da Conceição Alves, who worked as his housemaid. He was raised by António Gomes, a goldsmith, after his father married Mariana Leocádia Leitão e Carvalhosa, daughter of the Viscount of Santarém.

Francisco Gomes da Silva was sent to the seminary of Santarém to be ordained priest. In 1807, he left the seminary, rejoined his adoptive father and sailed to Brazil together with the royal family, escaping the invading French forces.

In Rio de Janeiro, António Gomes established a shop at Rua Direita (current Rua Primeiro de Março). Chalaça started to help him, but soon his bohemian and unruly nightlife led him to a serious fight with his "father". He left home and opened a barber shop at Rua do Piolho (now Rua da Carioca), where he worked as a surgeon, dentist and bleeder, applying leeches and suction cups.

In 1810 he was employed by the royal family as a palace servant. There, he became an acquaintance to the Prince D. Pedro, accompanying him into revels, drinking and procuring women to his several affairs. His lively personality and disposition granted him the nickname of "chalaça". Gomes da Silva owned or co-owned a number of taverns and inns in Rio de Janeiro, one of them with Maria Pulquéria, wife of an army bugler and his mistress.

In 1817, Gomes da Silva was expelled from royal service after being caught seducing a court lady. After the return of King John VI to Portugal and the permanence of Prince D. Pedro in Brazil, he was reinstated into royal service.

He joined Pedro's entourage in his travel to São Paulo on 7 September 1822, the proclamation of the Brazilian Independence. His education, good calligraphy and fluency in several languages prompted Pedro to choose him as his personal secretary. It is said that he introduced Domitila de Castro, daughter of a São Paulo landowner, to Pedro, married to Maria Leopoldina of Austria. The prince became infatuated of her and would become her lover.

With Pedro I proclaimed Emperor of Brazil, Chalaça became lieutenant of his guard of honor in 1823, later being promoted to captain. Chalaça was one of a number of courtiers closest to the Emperor, part of an inner circle, a so-called "secret cabinet". He helped to draft the first Brazilian constitution, in 1824.

On 25 April 1830, Chalaça was appointed as ambassador to the Kingdom of the Two Sicilies, the nomination was considered a maneuver orchestrated by political adversaries, namely the Marquis of Barbacena.

== Cultural depictions ==
Francisco Gomes da Silva was often represented on the screen in Brazil.

His character appears in:

- The film O Grito do Ipiranga (1917), where his character is played by Giorgio Lambertini;
- The film Independência ou Morte (1972), where his role is played by Emiliano Queiroz;
- The telenovela Marquesa de Santos (1984), where his character is played by Edwin Luisi;
- The film Carlota Joaquina, Princesa do Brazil (1995);
- The miniseries O Quinto dos Infernos (2002), where his role is played by Humberto Martins;
- The telenovela Novo Mundo (2017), where his character is played by Rômulo Estrela.

Francisco Gomes da Silva also appears in several literary works:

- the comic book Chalaça, o Amigo do Imperador, written by André Diniz and drawn by Antonio Eder (2005);
- the fictional autobiography O Chalaça by José Roberto Torero (1998);

and he also inspired an opera:

- O Chalaça, by Brazilian composer Francisco Mignone (1971).
