= National Historical Museum (Brazil) =

History museum in Rio de Janeiro, Brazil

Coordinates: 22°54′21.27″S 43°10′10.28″W

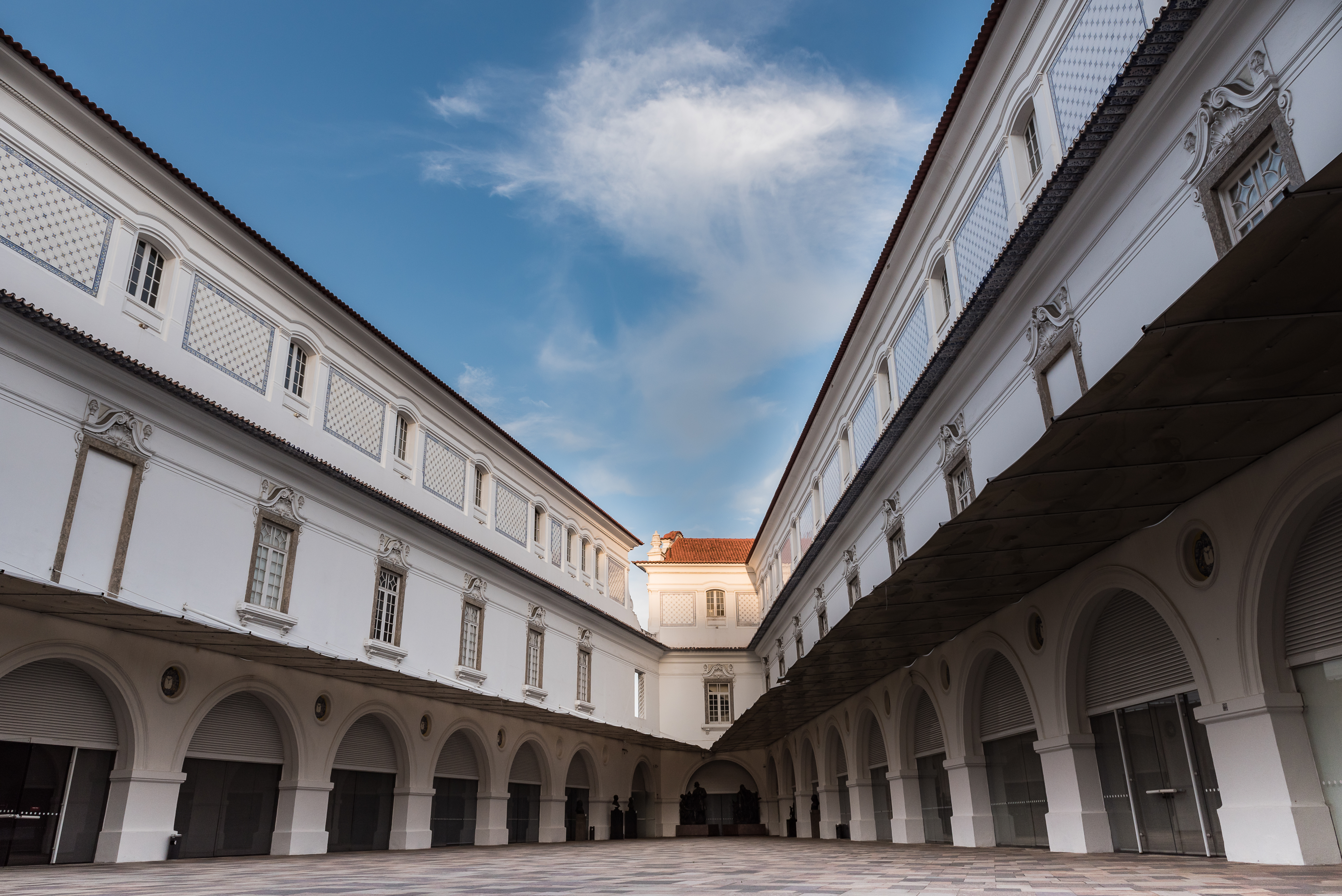
- The National Historical Museum inner patio
- Interactive map of the National Historical Museum area

General information
- Location: Rio de Janeiro, Brazil
- Construction started: 1762

Website
- mhn.museus.gov.br

The National Historical Museum (Portuguese: Museu Histórico Nacional) of Brazil was created in 1922, and possesses over 287,000 items, including the largest numismatic collection of Latin America. The architectural complex that houses the museum was built in 1603 as the St. James of Mercy Fort; earlier structures date back to 1567, erected by order of King Sebastian I of Portugal. In 1693, the Calaboose Prison, for slaves, was built. In 1762, the Casa do Trem was added as a depot of weapons and ammunition. The last additions are the War Arsenal (1764) and the Barracks (1835).

== History ==
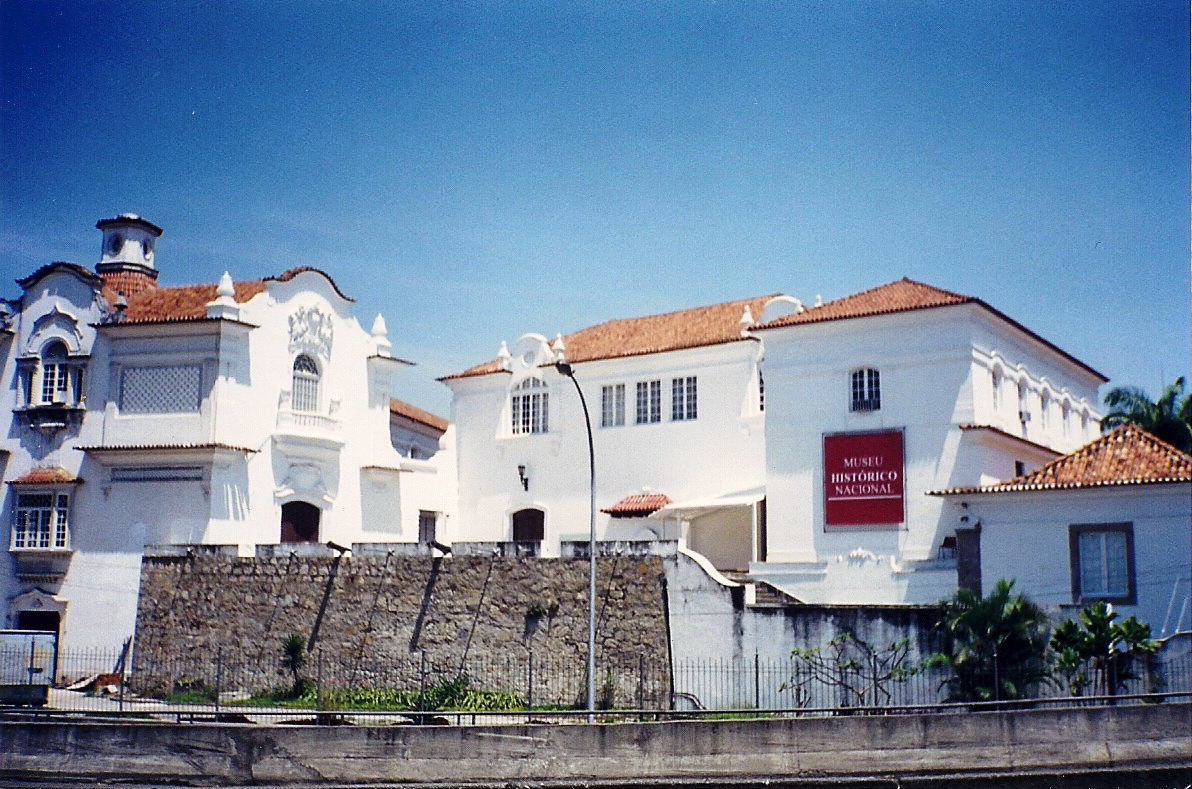
The National Historical Museum

Created in August 1922, by decree of President Epitácio Pessoa the National Historical Museum starts its activities in October, integrating the Centennial Exhibition, in two special rooms of the Casa do Trem (Ammunition Depot).

During 75 years of continuous activities, the Museum assembled the largest collection under the auspices of the Ministry of Culture and has become an important center of culture, occupying gradually all the architectural complex of the Calaboose Point, where the Santiago Fort was once situated.

As the first Brazilian museum to run an official museology course, it served as a starting point for the formation of other important local museums, thus becoming internationally known in the 1940s.

Today, the museum complex occupies an area of 20,000 m^{2}. It holds over 287,000 items, displayed in more than 25 permanent and non-permanent exhibits.

The museum library alone has over 57,000 titles, many dating back as far as the 15th century, and 50,000 documents and photographs.

== Collection ==
The formation of the collection of the National Historical Museum departed from items of other institutions already existing at the time of its foundation. Various elements and pieces from the Brazilian National Archives and the Numismatic Office of the National Library. He also collaborated in the acquisition of Casa da Moeda, the National Museum of Fine Arts, the Ministry of the Army and the Ministry of the Navy.

The collection of private collectors, such as the Bahian senator Miguel Calmon de Pin e Almeida, the Guinle family and the museologist Sophia Jobin helped to compose the property of the museum in its initial period. Another important collection, acquired in the early years of the museum, is the ivory religious sculptures of businessman and collector Souza Lima, purchased by President Getúlio Vargas in a certain modality promoted by the Caixa Econômica Federal in 1940.

== Digital Collection ==
The digital collection of the National Historical Museum (MHN) is an online repository open to the public that provides exhibits and technical reserves of the institution. The installation initially has 500 works from the collection of paintings, and in the coming months will be added new items from other areas of the museum collection.

The collection was curated by the MHN team. In this first phase, three new collections were published: "Marinhas - De Martino", "Portraits of the Empire" and "Carioca Landscapes".

The collection is available at this link: http://mhn.acervos.museus.gov.br/

== Artifact center ==
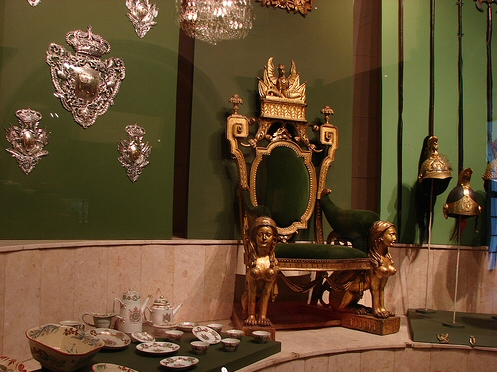
The Imperial throne of Pedro II of Brazil.

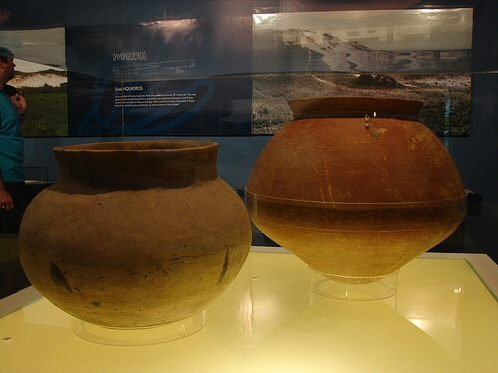
Temporary exhibit featuring indigenous vases.

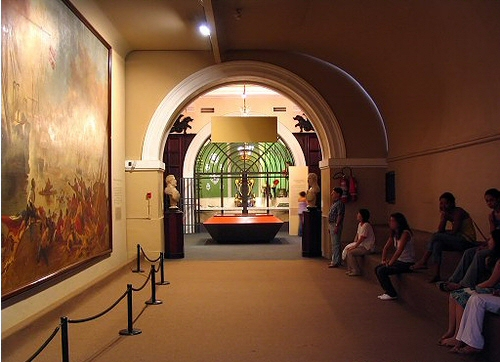
One of the museums most important pieces: "The Battle of Riachuelo", 1882.

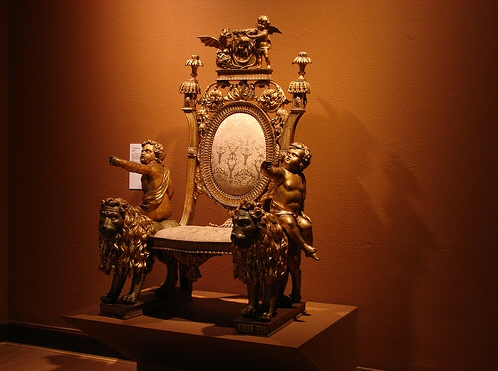
The Royal throne of King John VI of Portugal.

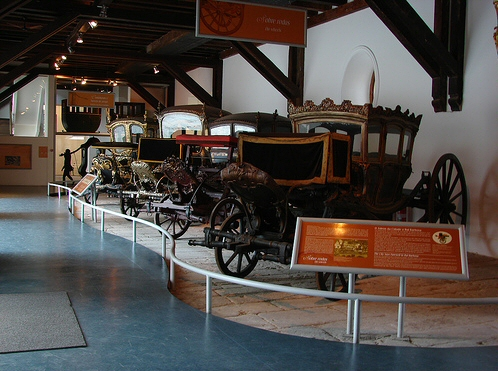
Permanent exhibit featuring carriages of the imperial era.

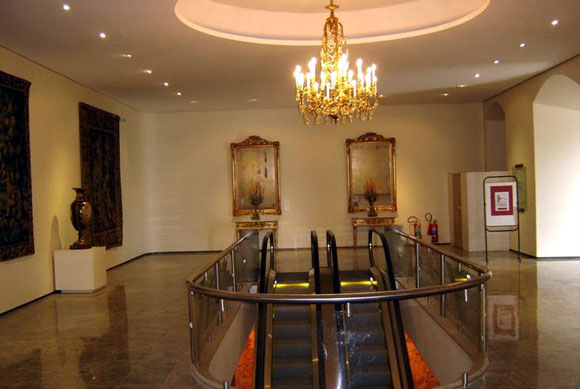
Interior of the museum.

== See also ==
- Cultural Complex of the Republic: National Library, National Museum of the Republic (Brasilia)
- National Library of Brazil
- National Museum of Brazil
