= Battle of Casa Forte =

- Part of Dutch invasions of Brazil
- Monument to the Battle of Casa Forte
Date	August 17, 1645
Location	Pernambuco, Portuguese Brazil
Result	Portuguese victory

Belligerents
Portugal	WIC

Commanders and leaders
João Fernandes Vieira; André Vidal de Negreiros; Henrique Dias; Felipe Camarão	(Dutch West India Company) Hendrik van Haus (POW) (Dutch West India Company) Jan Blaer (executed)

Strength
More than 1,000 soldiers	850 soldiers

Casualties and losses
18 dead	37 dead Many wounded 300 prisoners

The Battle of Casa Forte was the second major clash in the War of Divine Light, fought between Dutch troops and Portuguese militias. The confrontation took place in 1645 and ended in a Portuguese victory.

After the defeat suffered by the Dutch army against the Portuguese in the Battle of Tabocas, the Dutch troops marched back to Recife and camped at the Casa Forte mill belonging to Anna Paes. In August 16, the Dutch captain, Hendrik van Haus, ordered Jan Blaer to occupy the village of Várzea and to search the houses where the families of the revolutionary leaders from Pernambuco lived and arrest their wives.

The mission returned on the same day, with several prisoners, including Isabel de Góis, wife of Antônio Bezerra; Ana Bezerra, mother-in-law of João Fernandes Vieira; and Maria Luisa de Oliveira, wife of Amaro Lopes; they were imprisoned in the "Casa Forte" (English: Strong House).

Once the news were delivered to the Portuguese army, which was in the vicinity of Tejipió, the commanders, João Fernandes Vieira, André Vidal de Negreiros, Henrique Dias and Felipe Camarão, organized their troops and marched to help the women. They arrived on August 17 after a forced march and a swim across the Capibaribe River at dawn, and only the vanguard could participate at the beginning of the battle.

The Dutch were caught by surprise and a fight began. Hendrik van Haus ended up capitulating and was taken captive. After being released in Portugal, he returned to Dutch Brazil, where he died in the Battle of Guararapes. Jan Blaer was also taken captive, but the Portuguese decided to execute him while he was being taken to Bahia among other prisoners. The women captives were liberated.

== See also ==
- Dutch-Portuguese War
- First Battle of Guararapes
- Second Battle of Guararapes
- Recapture of Recife (1652–1654)
