= List of wars involving Brazil =

This is a list of wars involving the Federative Republic of Brazil and its predecessor states, starting from 1815, when Brazil was elevated to a kingdom within the United Kingdom of Portugal, Brazil, and the Algarves, up to the present day.

== France Antarctique ==
- Battle of Rio de Janeiro (1558)
- Battle of Rio de Janeiro (1567) - 1567 - Portuguese colonial campaigns
- Battle of São Vicente - 1583 - Pre-Anglo-Spanish War

== Anglo-Spanish War (1585–1604) ==
- Battle of São Vicente (1583)
- Capture of Recife (1595)

== Dutch–Portuguese War ==
- Capture of Salvador (1624)
- Recapture of Salvador (1625)
- Siege of Recife (1630)
- Battle of Abrolhos (1631)
- Siege of Salvador (1638)
- Action of 12–17 January 1640
- Battle of Tabocas (1645)
- First Battle of Guararapes (1648)
- Second Battle of Guararapes (1649)
- Recapture of Recife (1652–1654)

== War of the Spanish Succession ==
- Battle of Rio de Janeiro (1710)
- Battle of Rio de Janeiro (1711)

== United Kingdom of Portugal, Brazil and the Algarves (1815–1822) ==
Conflict	Combatant 1	Combatant 2	Result	King
Portuguese conquest of the Banda Oriental (1816–1820)	United Kingdom of Portugal, Brazil and the Algarves	Federal League: Entre Ríos; Misiones; Corrientes; Santa Fe; Córdoba	Luso-Brazilian victory: Annexation of the Banda Oriental by the United Kingdom of Portugal, Brazil and the Algarves	John VI

== Empire of Brazil (1822–1889) ==
Conflict	Combatant 1	Combatant 2	Result	Emperor
Brazilian War of Independence (1822–1825)	Independentists Empire of Brazil (from 7 September 1822)	Loyalists: Portuguese Empire; Kingdom of Brazil	Independentist victory: Treaty of Rio de Janeiro	Pedro I
Confederation of the Equator (1824)	Empire of Brazil	Confederation of the Equator	Loyalist victory	Pedro I
Cisplatine War (1825–1828)	Empire of Brazil	United Provinces	Preliminary Peace Convention: Cisplatina becomes independent as Uruguay (Note: Articles I and II of the Preliminary Peace Convention, Câmara dos Deputados 1828, p. 121: Article I: "His Majesty, the Emperor of Brazil, declares the Province of Montevideo, today called Cisplatina, separated from the territory of the Empire of Brazil, so that it can constitute itself in a free State, and independent of all and any nation, under the form of government that it deems most suited to its interests, needs and resources."; Article II: "The government of the Republic of the United Provinces of the Río de la Plata agrees to declare, for its part, the independence of the Province of Montevideo, today called Cisplatina, so that it constitutes a free and independent State in the terms declared in the preceding article.")	Pedro I
Irish and German Mercenary Soldiers' revolt (1828)	Empire of Brazil	Irish and German Mercenary Rebels	Empire of Brazil victory: Revolt suppressed	Pedro I
Cabanagem (1835–1840)	Empire of Brazil	Cabanos	Empire of Brazil victory	Pedro II
Ragamuffin War (1835–1845)	Empire of Brazil	Piratini Republic; Juliana Republic; Italian Redshirts Support: Colorados; Unitarians	Imperial victory: The Juliana Republic and the Riograndense Republic are dissolved and reintegrated into the Empire.	Pedro II
Sabinada (1837–1838)	Empire of Brazil	Bahia Republic	Government victory: Reincorporation of Bahia into Brazil.	Pedro II
Platine War (1851–1852)	Empire of Brazil Defence Government Argentine rebels: Entre Ríos; Corrientes; Santa Fe; Co-belligerent: Paraguay (1845–1850); Supported by: Bolivia; United Kingdom; France; Paraguay (1851–1852)	Argentine Confederation Cerrito Government	Brazilian-led allied victory: Buenos Aires clout over the Platine region ends; Brazilian hegemony in the Platine region starts	Pedro II
Uruguayan War (1864–1865)	Empire of Brazil; Colorados; Argentina; Unitarios	Uruguay; Blancos; Federales; Support: Paraguay	Brazilian–Colorado victory: Start of the Paraguayan War	Pedro II
Paraguayan War (1864–1870)	Empire of Brazil; Argentina; Uruguay	Paraguay	Allied victory: Treaty of the Triple Alliance ended; Loizaga–Cotegipe Treaty between Brazil and Paraguay; Machaín-Irigoyen Treaty between Argentina and Paraguay; Free navigation in the Platine region; Allied occupation of Paraguay; Paraguay permanently lost its claims to lands amounting to almost 40% of its prewar claimed territories.; Brazil definitively gained the disputed territories north of the Apa River, now part of Mato Grosso do Sul state.; Argentina definitively gained the disputed Misiones Province and all the disputed lands south of the Pilcomayo River now constituting Formosa Province.	Pedro II

== Brazilian Republic (1889–) ==
Conflict	Combatant 1	Combatant 2	Result	President
Federalist Revolution (1893–1895)	Brazil	Federalist rebels; Navy rebels; Uruguayan volunteers	Government victory	Floriano Peixoto
Trinidad Conflict (1893-1897)	(Brazil) Brazilian government Supported by: Portugal	Principality of Trinidad United Kingdom	Government Victory: Brazil Stabilishes Sovereignty over Trinidad and Martim Vaz Archipelago	Floriano Peixoto Prudente de Morais
Manhuassu Conflict (1896)	(Brazil) Brazilian government	Manhuassu Republic	Government victory: Serafim Escapes to Espirito Santo	Prudente de Morais
War of Canudos (1896–1897)	Brazil: Brazilian Army; Police Corps	Canudos inhabitants: Jagunços; Civil militia	Government victory: Movement squashed; Settlements destroyed and survivors massacred	Prudente de Morais
Acre War (1899–1903)	Republic of Acre; Supported by: Brazil	(Bolivia) Bolivia; Supported by: United States	Brazilian victory: Treaty of Petrópolis (between Bolivia and Brazil); Valerde-Río Branco Treaty (between Brazil and Peru); Polo-Bustamante Treaty (between Peru and Bolivia); Brazilian annexation of Acre	Campos Sales Rodrigues Alves
Contestado War (1912–1916)	Brazil; Brazilian Army; Paraná; Police	Rebels	Government victory	Hermes da Fonseca
Contestado War (1912–1916)	Brazil; Brazilian Army; Paraná; Police	Rebels	Government victory	Venceslau Brás
First World War (1914–1918) (Limited involvement, 1917–1918) Brazil during World War I	Allied Powers: France; United Kingdom; and Empire: Australia; Canada; Ceylon; Egypt; Newfoundland; New Zealand; India; South Africa; Russia (until 1917) (Note: The Russian Empire during 1914–1917, the Russian Republic during 1917. The Bolshevik government signed a separate peace with the Central Powers shortly after their armed seizure of power, resulting in a Central Powers victory on the Eastern Front of the war, and the Russian Soviet Federative Socialist Republic's defeat. However, this peace treaty was nullified by an Allied Powers victory on the Western Front, and the end of the war.); Italy (from 1915); United States (from 1917); Japan; Brazil; and others	Central Powers: German Empire; Austria-Hungary; Ottoman Empire; Bulgaria (from 1915); and others	Allied Powers victory (see Aftermath of World War I): Partition of the Ottoman Empire, dissolution of Austria-Hungary, Partition of German territories, all of their colonies lost, Bulgaria lost Thrace and smaller border areas; Formation of new countries in Europe and the Middle East, such as Poland, Yugoslavia, Weimar Germany, Soviet Russia and Soviet Union, Lithuania, Estonia, Latvia, Austria, Hungary, Czechoslovakia, Turkey, Hejaz, and Yemen	Venceslau Brás
Constitutionalist Revolution (1932)	Federal government; Brazilian Army; Army Aviation; Brazilian Navy; Marine Corps; Naval Aviation; Loyalists; Police Corps; Minas Gerais; Rio de Janeiro; Paraná	Constitutionalists; São Paulo; São Paulo Police; 2nd Army; Maracaju; Gaúcho United Front	Government and loyalist victory: Brazilian Constitution of 1934	Getúlio Vargas
Second World War (1939–1945 (Note: While various other dates have been proposed as the date on which World War II began or ended, this is the period most frequently cited.)) (Limited involvement, 1942–1945) Brazil in World War II	Allies; United States; Soviet Union; United Kingdom; China (Brazil) Brazil and others	Axis; Germany; Italy; Japan and others	Allied victory	Getúlio Vargas
Dominican Civil War (1965)	Loyalist faction United States IAPF: Brazil; Paraguay; Nicaragua; Costa Rica; El Salvador; Honduras	Constitutionalist faction: Dominican Revolutionary Party; Social Christian Revolutionary Party; June 14th Revolutionary Movement	Loyalist victory: Ceasefire declared; Formation of the provisional government for new elections; Deposition of Juan Bosch of the presidency ratified; Organization of presidential elections in 1966 under international supervision; Election of Joaquín Balaguer as the new president; Establishment of the Fourth Dominican Republic on July 1, 1966	Humberto Castelo Branco
Araguaia Guerrilla War (1966–1975)	Brazilian military government	Communist Party of Brazil	Brazilian military government victory	Emílio Garrastazu Médici; Ernesto Geisel

== See also ==
- Military history of Brazil
- Brazilian drug war

== Bibliography ==
- Câmara dos Deputados (1828). "Carta de Lei de 30 de Agosto de 1828" (PDF) (in Portuguese). Archived (PDF) from the original on 1 March 2022.
- Fausto, Boris; Fausto, Sérgio (2022). História Concisa do Brasil. EDUSP. ISBN 978-85-3141-582-1.
- Franchini, Helio (2015). Independência e Morte: Política e Guerra na Emancipação do Brasil (1821–1823) (PDF) (Thesis) (in Portuguese). Brasília: Programa de Pós-Graduação em História da Universidade de Brasília.
- Furtado, Joaci Pereira (2000). A Guerra do Paraguai (1864–1870) (in Portuguese). São Paulo: Saraiva. ISBN 978-85-02-03102-9.
- Golin, Tau (2004). A Fronteira (in Portuguese). Vol. 2. Porto Alegre: L&PM Editores. ISBN 978-85-254-1438-0.
- Halperín Donghi, Tulio (2007). The Contemporary History of Latin America. Durham: Duke University Press. ISBN 978-08-2231-374-8.
- Whigham, Thomas L. (2002). The Paraguayan War: Causes and Early Conduct. Vol. 1. Lincoln: University of Nebraska Press. ISBN 978-0-8032-4786-4.
