= Battle of Guararapes =

Battle of Guararapes may refer to:

- First Battle of Guararapes (1648)
- Second Battle of Guararapes (1649)
- Batalha dos Guararapes, an 1879 painting by Victor Meirelles
