= Insurrection of Pernambuco =

Conflict in Brazil in the 17th century

Pernambucan revolt
- Part of the Dutch–Portuguese War
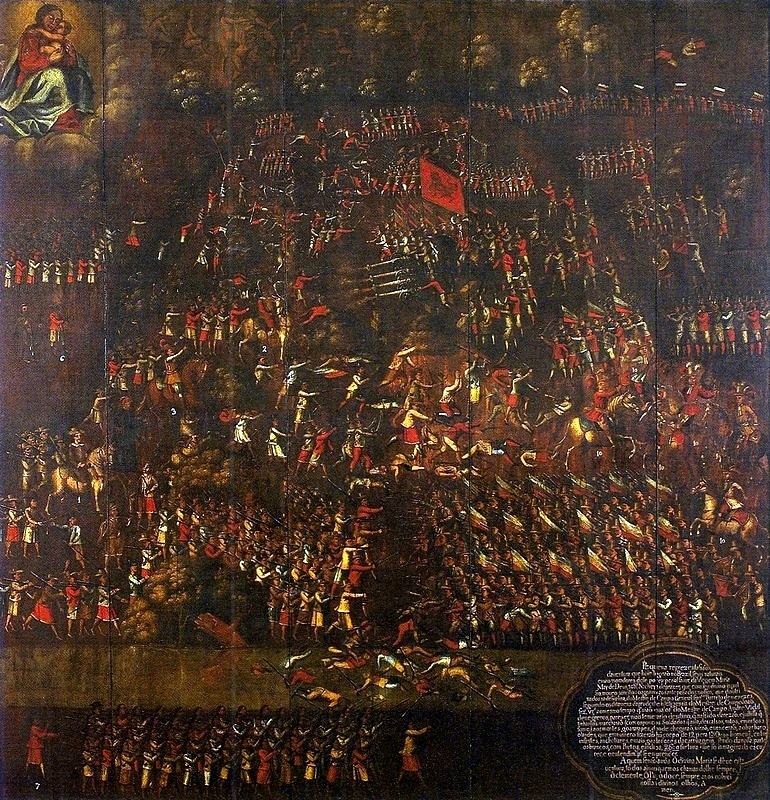
- The Battle of Guararapes
Date	1645–1654
Location	Northeastern Brazil
Result	Portuguese victory

Belligerents
Portugal (Note: In personal union with Spain from 1580 to 1640. See also Personal Union); State of Brazil	Dutch Republic; West India Company

Commanders and leaders
André Negreiros; Henrique Dias; Filipe Camarão; Francisco Barreto; João Vieira; Pedro Jacques; António de Meneses	Krzysztof Arciszewski; Sigismund Schkopp (WIA); Hendrik Haus †; Jan Blaer (executed); (Dutch West India Company) Walter Van Loo; (Dutch West India Company) Van Brinck †; (Dutch West India Company) Jan Lichthart; (Dutch West India Company) Witte de With

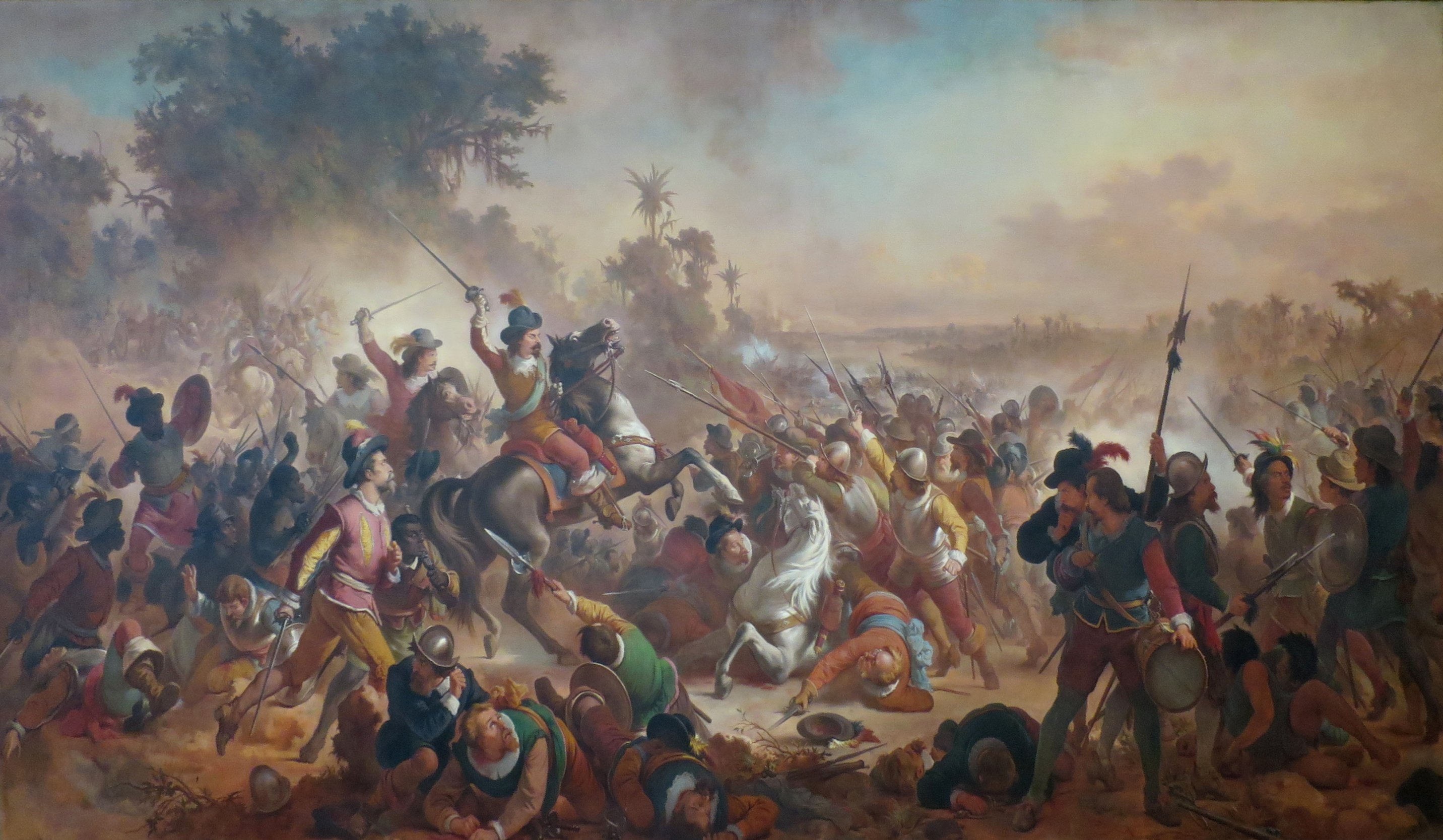
Victor Meirelles - Battle of Guararapes, 1879, oil on canvas.

The Insurrection of Pernambuco (Portuguese: Insurreição Pernambucana), also known as the War of the Divine Light (Guerra da Luz Divina), was a movement against Dutch rule in the Captaincy of Pernambuco. The revolution occurred in the course of the second Dutch invasion during the Dutch–Portuguese War and resulted in the expulsion of the Dutch from the northeast region of Brazil, followed by the reclamation of the territory by the Kingdom of Portugal.

On May 15, 1645, 18 Portuguese rebel leaders gathered at the São João Sugar Mill and signed a pledge to fight against Dutch rule in the captaincy. The movement involved groups led by André Vidal de Negreiros, João Fernandes Vieira, Henrique Dias and Filipe Camarão, in the famous Battles of Guararapes, fought between 1648 and 1649 and crucial to the expulsion of the Dutch from Brazil in 1654.

== Historical background ==
Map of "New Netherlands", with its territory stretching from Sergipe to Maranhão.

Until the arrival of Maurice of Nassau, administrator of the West India Company (WIC), in the conquered territories in 1637, the Portuguese waged the so-called "Guerra Brasílica", a type of guerrilla warfare that consisted of quick, stealthy attacks on Dutch forces and rapid retreat into the woods. When Nassau implemented a policy of stabilization in the captured territories, these ambushes were suspended in the captaincy of Pernambuco.

Under his government, northeastern Brazil experienced a golden age knows as the "New Netherlands". Upon landing in Pernambuco, he found around 7,000 people living in the worst hygiene and housing conditions. Then, he ordered the construction of bridges and palaces, began the urbanization of the area that is now known as the Santo Antônio district in Recife and encouraged the arts and sciences. His new reality was portrayed mainly by Frans Post and Albert Eckhout.

Regarding the exploitation of the colony, Nassau was tolerant of the plantation owners, who owed a lot to the WIC. He was equally liberal towards Judaism and Catholicism, allowing all religions to be professed freely. He also opted not to confiscate mills or suppress revolts with cruelty, contrary to the measures desired by the WIC lords.

=== Immediate causes of the Insurrection ===
At the beginning of 1640, a Portuguese-Spanish fleet failed to land in Pernambuco and was destroyed near Ilha de Itamaracá, sparking the war for Brazil. In the meantime, the Dutch conquer São Tomé and Príncipe and Luanda, in Angola, slave supply centers.

Portugal had already been in conflict with the Netherlands since 1595, when the Portuguese freed themselves from Spanish rule in December and started the Restoration War. The new king of Portugal, John IV, faced with a long war against Spain, signed a ten-year truce between Portugal and the Netherlands and ordered the Brazilian settlers not to attack the Dutch.

In the northeast of Brazil, the sugar cane mills, which were struggling in a year of plagues and drought, began to face pressure from the West India Company, responsible for collecting debts and confiscating the mills of defaulting farmers. This situation led to the outbreak of the Insurrection of Pernambuco, culminating in the extinction of Dutch rule in Brazil.

== The war ==
Battle of Guararapes

On June 13, 1645, the rebellion began under the command of André Vidal de Negreiros and João Fernandes Vieira. Initially, the Dutch government didn't pay much attention to the movement. When Henrique Dias and Filipe Camarão entered Alagoas, Nassau began sending military commanders to put an end to the outbreaks of revolt.

On August 3, 1645, the two armies clashed in the Battle of Mount Tabocas. Dutch commander Hendrick Haus was convinced that he would fight amateur soldiers, men with no military experience, and carried a large number of chains to take the rebels prisoner. However, Haus was lured into an ambush which resulted in the defeat of the Dutch troops.

The victory at Mount Tabocas boosted the rebels' confidence. The leaders of the movement decided to march south of Recife to meet the troops of Henrique Dias and Filipe Camarão, who were coming from Bahia. When the Dutch authorities became aware of the situation, they sent emissaries to the governor general of Brazil, Antonio Teles da Silva, who, however, said that Dias and Camarão were acting on their own and that there was nothing he could do, but promised to try to pacify them. However, despite this commitment, Antonio Teles began to actively help the movement.

After occupying the Fort of Santo Antônio do Cabo, André Vidal's troops joined those of Vieira, Dias and Camarão and landed close to Recife after retaking Olinda. Vidal, however, didn't attack Recife because he believed he wasn't ready for it yet.

The Action at Tamanana, 9 September 1645 saw a Portuguese fleet attempting to enter the bay of Tamandaré, but getting in a fight with a Dutch fleet, and getting taken down badly. Some escaped Portuguese left an account of the battle behind.

On October 7, the rebels of Pernambuco sent a manifesto to King John IV about their right to rise up against Dutch domination. Under pressure from the Dutch government, John IV sent orders to Bahia for his men to leave the Dutch colony. At the same time, he informed the Dutch that if he was not respected, he could do nothing. Meanwhile, in Brazil, the rebellious Portuguese suffered a defeat at sea when Serrão de Paiva's fleet was beaten by Jan Cornelisz Lichthart's troops. At the beginning of 1647, the Dutch invaded the island of Itaparica in Bahia, but the Portuguese regained it at the beginning of the following year. New reinforcements arrived from both the Netherlands and Portugal, with the Dutch commanded by Witte Corneliszoon de With and the Portuguese by the Count of Vila Pouca de Aguiar, the new governor-general of Brazil.

Still in 1647, Father Antônio Vieira, an advisor to John IV, suggested that the king buy Pernambuco from the Dutch, but the proposal was rejected by the Netherlands the following year.

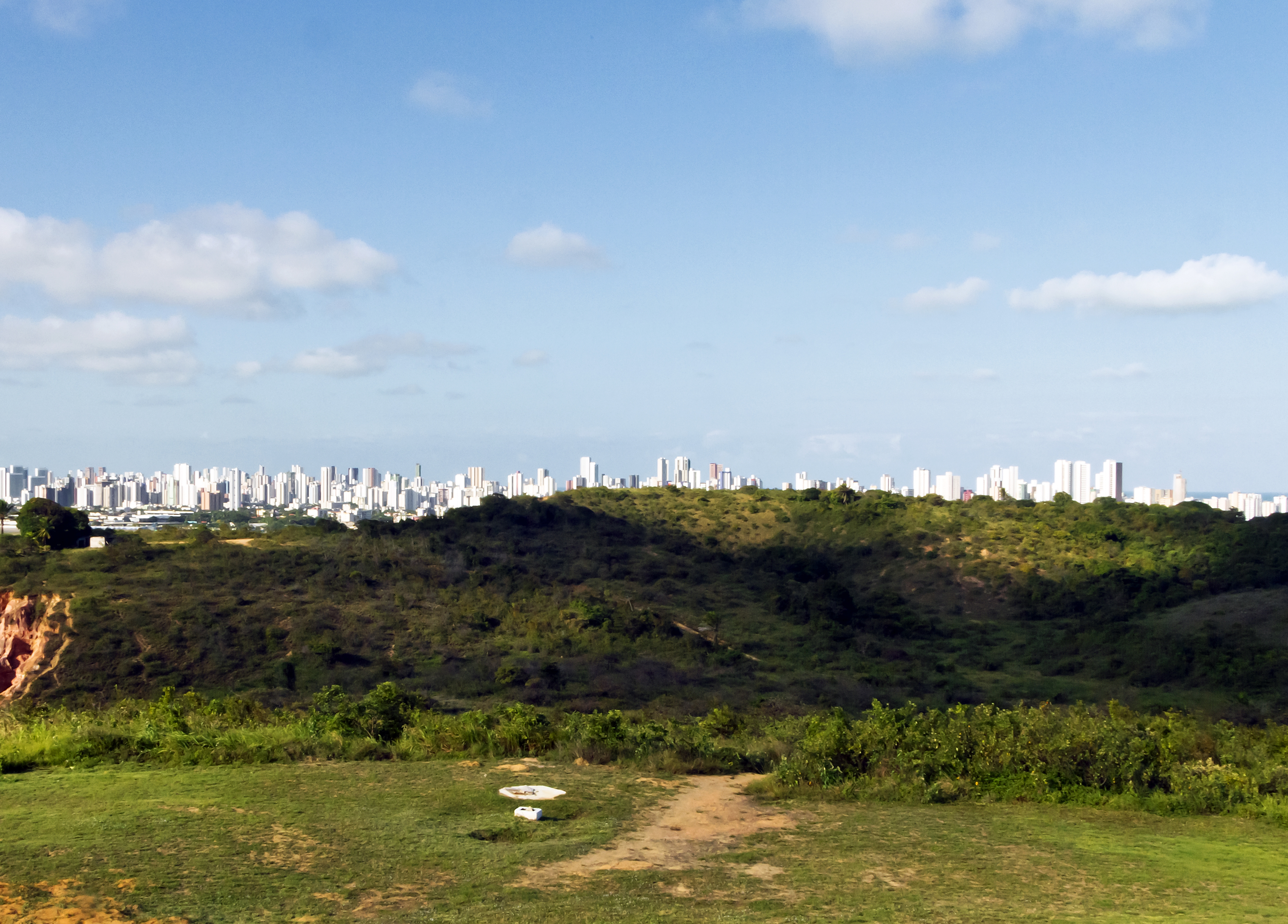
Guararapes Hill, where the Battles of Guararapes were fought, with Recife in the background. The Guararapes National Historical Park is listed as a heritage site by IPHAN.

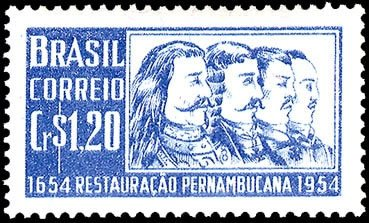
Postage stamp with the main figures of the battle.

On April 18, 1648, the Guararapes Hill was occupied by 2,400 Portuguese soldiers from the Northeast. The following day, 4,500 Dutch arrived to confront them. Despite being outnumbered, the Portuguese leader Muniz Barreto decided to face the enemy in the First Battle of Guararapes. After five hours of fighting, the Portuguese-Northeasterners emerged victorious, but one of their leaders, Filipe Camarão, died of wounds sustained during the battle.

The Second Battle of Guararapes was fought on February 19, 1649, and, as in the first battle, the Dutch were outnumbered and underestimated the skill of the Portuguese and Northeastern allied commanders. The Brazilians moved their troops during the night and, when dawn broke, the Dutch found themselves almost surrounded. When they tried to retreat, they were attacked by the Allies, suffering another defeat in which 1028 men were killed, including the commander Colonel Brinck, and 90 men were taken prisoner. On the side of the Portuguese-Northeasterners, the casualties were 45 dead and 200 wounded.

In March 1649, the General Trading Company of Brazil was created in Portugal with the aim of confronting its Dutch rival and helping to retake Pernambuco.

Over the next few years, the Dutch were more intimidated by the advance of the Allies, until, in 1652, the Netherlands went to war with England, which made it impossible for them to send reinforcements to their colony. Taking advantage of this, John IV sent a squadron made up of 13 warships and 64 armed merchant ships under the command of Pedro Jaques de Magalhães, which arrived in Pernambuco on December 20, 1653, and laid siege to Recife. On January 15, 1654, the Portuguese-Northeasterners, commanded by André Vital, attacked Recife. On the 23rd, the Dutch made a peace proposal which was accepted by the Allies. On January 26, 1654, the Dutch leaders signed the surrender.

At the surrender, agreement was reached that all the towns, forts and armaments held by the Dutch would pass to the Portuguese crown; that all those who had helped the Dutch would receive amnesty; that the Dutch who wanted to remain in Brazil would have the same rights as the Portuguese; and that those who wanted to leave would be allowed to take all their possessions. The news of the surrender reached Portugal on March 19, the birthday of King John IV. Negotiations between Portugal and the Netherlands began soon afterwards.

=== International context ===
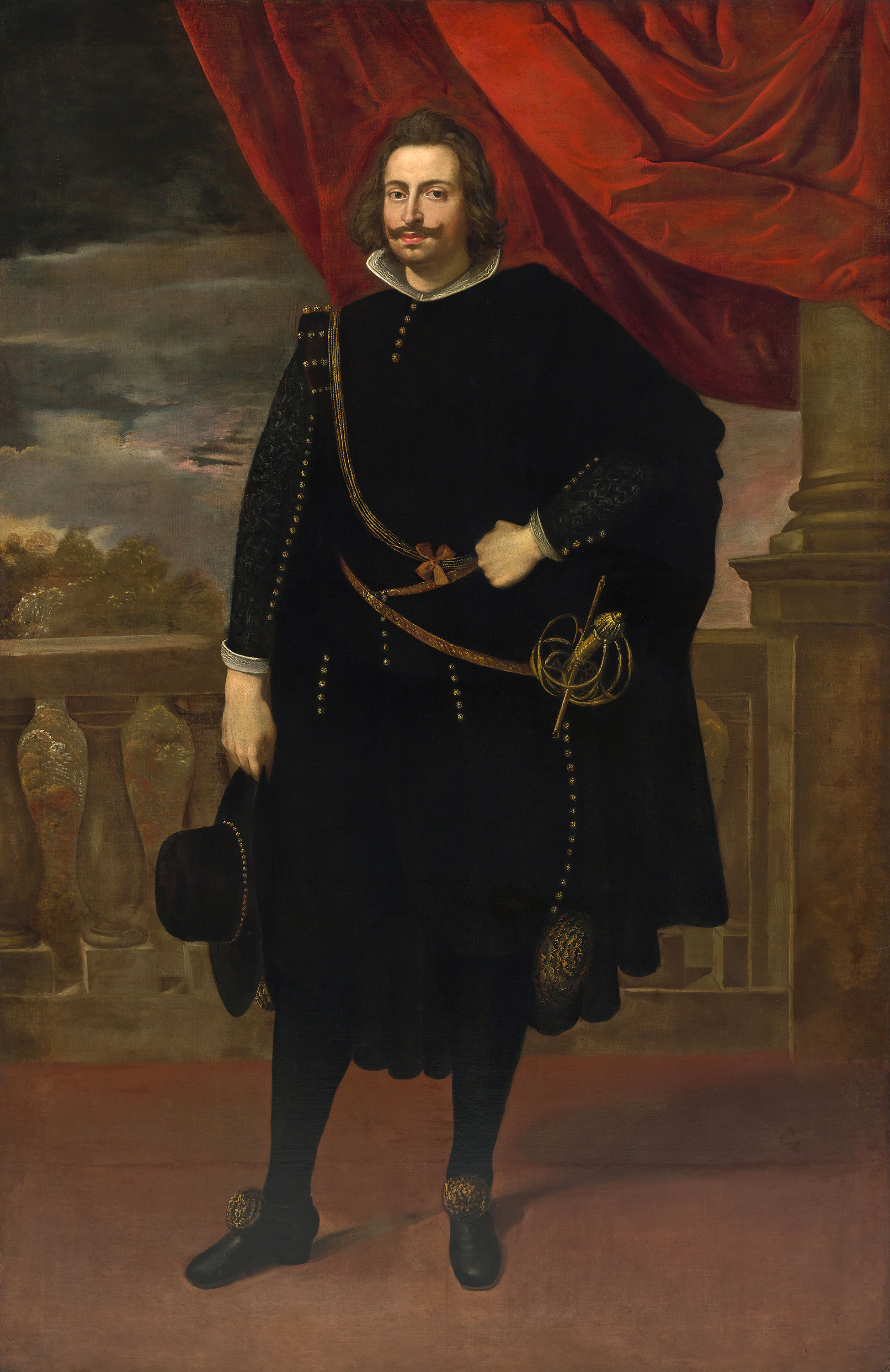
John IV, King of Portugal.

Once the Anglo-Dutch War was over, the Dutch turned against Portugal. A Dutch fleet blockaded Portugal's main ports while Dutch diplomats negotiated the conditions for peace between Portugal and the Netherlands with Queen Regent Luísa, widow of King John IV. The demands were high: Portugal was to return Pernambuco and the other territories of "New Netherlands" to the Dutch, hand over the Portuguese colonies of Angola and São Tomé and pay a hefty indemnity to the Dutch West India Company. The situation was difficult for Portugal, as they were at war with Spain. However, Portugal did not concede to these demands and the war continued until the marriage of the King of England, Charles II, to Catherine, daughter of King John IV and sister of King Afonso VI, which led England to intervene on Portugal's favor. The signing of a definitive peace, under more dignified conditions for Portugal, finally took place on August 6, 1661, with the Treaty of The Hague, in which "New Netherlands" was "sold" to Portugal for four million cruzados (or eight million guilders), to be paid in cash or sugar, tobacco and salt. Also under the terms of the agreement, the Dutch would enjoy customs benefits and commercial freedoms in the territories of the Portuguese empire. In 1662, due to the delay in paying the indemnity, Kochi was taken by the Dutch, breaking the agreement signed. The Dutch, fearful of losing the territories they had already conquered, ended up signing the peace definitively in 1663.

At the end of the war, Portugal ended up ceding Sri Lanka (also invaded by the East India Company), as well as granting the Netherlands privileges in the sugar trade. In return, they recognized full Portuguese sovereignty over Brazil and Angola.

== Main figures in the movement ==
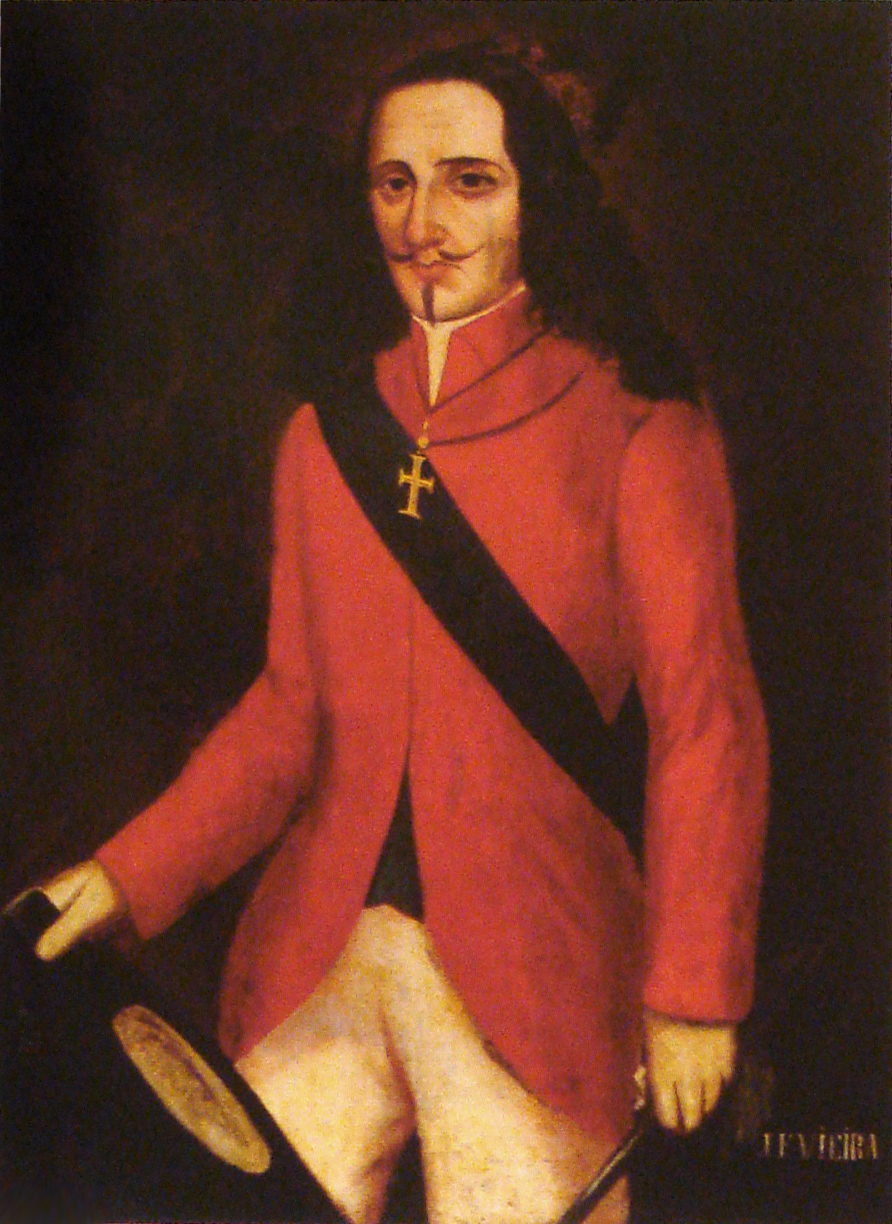
João Fernandes Vieira.

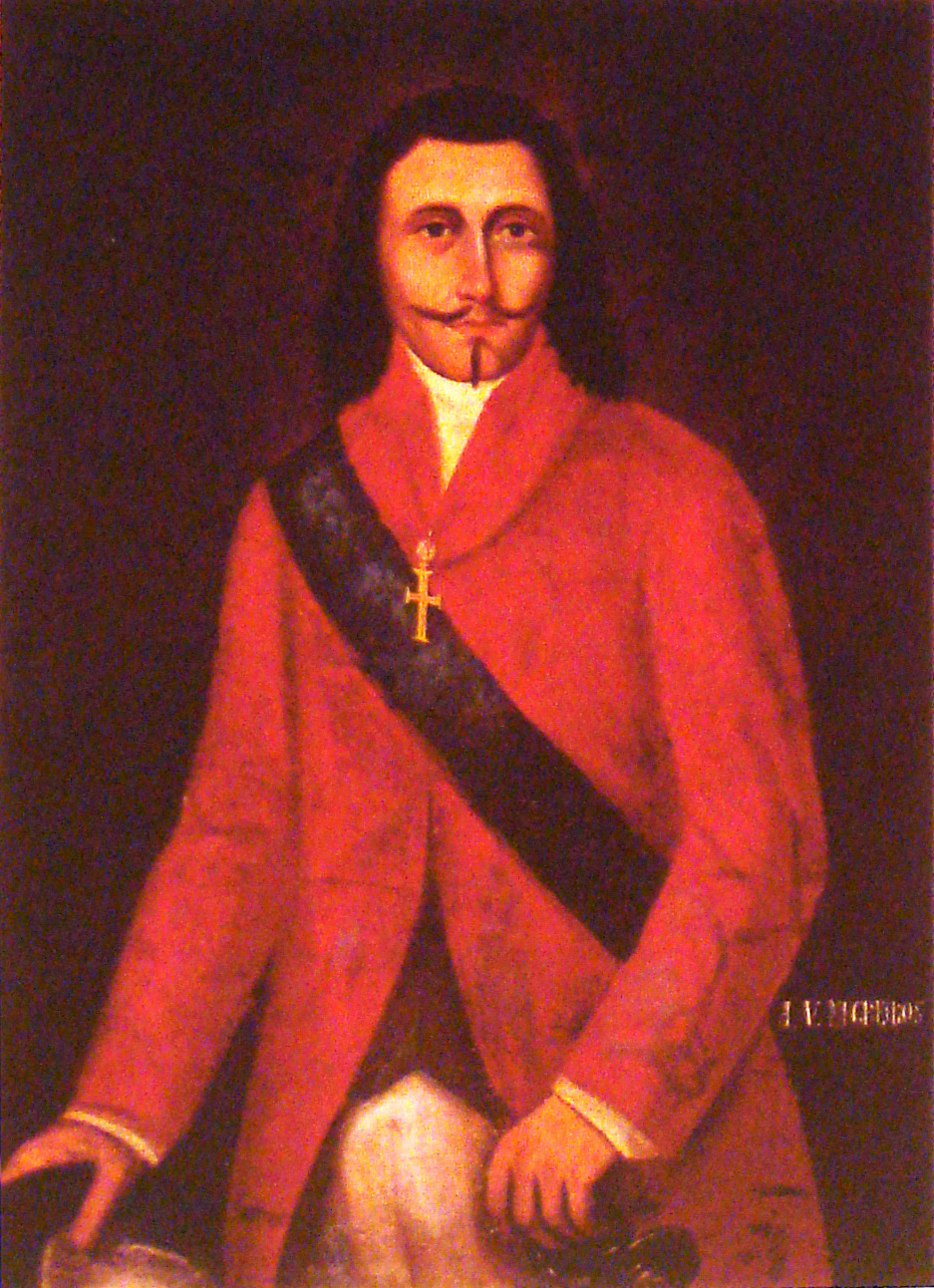
André Vidal de Negreiros.

- João Fernandes Vieira: Portuguese plantation owner who arrived in Brazil at the age of ten. According to historian Charles Ralph Boxer, he was the main leader of the reconquest of Pernambuco. Despite being of humble origins and perhaps even of color (there is evidence that his mother was not white), Fernandes Vieira governed Angola and Pernambuco. In 1645, he was the first signatory of the pact sealed at the time, in which the word "homeland" was used for the first time on Brazilian soil. As Master of the Field, he commanded the most powerful third of the Patriot Army in the two battles of Guararapes (1648 and 1649). For his achievements, he was acclaimed Supreme Chief of the Revolution and Governor of the War of Freedom and Restoration of Pernambuco;
- André Vidal de Negreiros: Portuguese military officer born in Brazil and colonial governor born in Paraíba. He mobilized resources and people from the northeastern hinterland to fight alongside the Portuguese troops. One of the best soldiers of his time, he took part with great bravery in almost every battle against the Dutch. He was appointed Master of the Field, and distinguished himself by commanding one of the thirds of the Patriot Army in the two battles of Guararapes. He commanded the siege of Recife which resulted in the Dutch capitulation in 1654. In the opinion of historian Francisco Adolfo de Varnhagen, André Vidal de Negreiros was the great promoter of the expulsion of the Dutch. For his achievements he was appointed governor and captain-general of the captaincies of Maranhão, Pernambuco and the State of Angola;
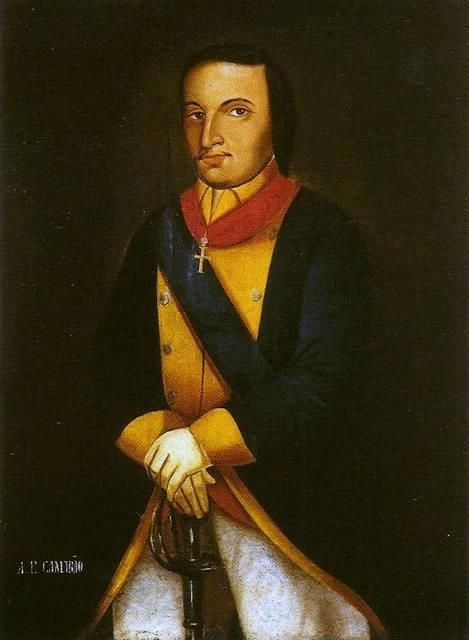
  Filipe Camarão.
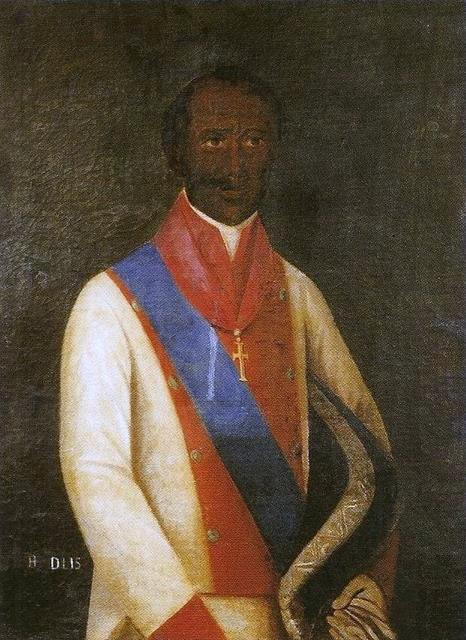
  Henrique Dias.
- Filipe Camarão or Potiguaçu: A native of the Potiguar tribe. Leading the warriors of his tribe, he organized guerrilla actions that proved essential in containing the advance of the invaders. He stood out in the battles of São Lourenço (1636), Porto Calvo (1637) and Mata Redonda (1638). In the latter year, he also took part in the defense of Salvador, attacked by Maurício de Nassau's best soldiers. He distinguished himself by commanding the right wing of the rebel army in the First Battle of Guararapes, for which he was awarded the Grace of Dom, the habit of Knight of the Order of Christ, the rank of nobleman with coat of arms and the title of Captain Major of All the Indigenous Peoples of Brazil;
- Henrique Dias: A son of slaves, known as "the governor of the black people". He recruited former Afro-Brazilian slaves from the mills devastated by the conflict and dominated by the invaders. As Master of the Field, he commanded the Rosary of Black and Mulatto Men of the Patriot Army in the two battles of Guararapes; his troops were also called Henriques or black militias. He took part in countless battles, distinguishing himself for his bravery in the battles of Igaraçu, where he was wounded twice. He also took part in the reconquest of Goiana and notoriously in Porto Calvo in 1637, when his left hand was blown off by an arquebus shot. When King John IV disallowed the Insurrection of Pernambuco, there was a brief truce, but even so Henrique Dias wrote these words to the Dutch "...My Dutch lords...Know that Pernambuco is...my homeland, and that we can no longer suffer so much absence from it. We shall lose our lives here, or we shall throw Your Grace out of it. And even if the Governor and His Majesty order us to withdraw to Bahia, first we have to answer them and give them the reasons we have for not giving up on this war." For his services, he also received several noble titles, such as the Order of Christ and the Commendation of Soure;
- Antonio Dias Cardoso: Portuguese, was one of the main leaders of the Insurrection of Pernambuco and commanded a small force that won the Battle of Mount Tabocas against a much larger troop led directly by Maurício de Nassau and later, also in smaller numbers, defeated in Casa Forte the Dutch troop commanded by Lieutenant-Colonel Hendrick Van Hans, Dutch Commander General in the Northeast of Brazil. He also took an active part in the two battles of Guararapes: in the first, he was sub-commander of the largest of the four thirds of the Patriot Army, having been given the lead on the main front by João Fernandes Vieira; in the second battle, he commanded the so-called Special Troop of the Patriot Army, defeating the entire right wing of the Dutch; in this conflict, Antonio Dias Cardoso began as a soldier. During the invasion of 1624 to 1625, he and his company succeeded in containing the invaders on the outskirts of Salvador, which was surrounded by Maurício de Nassau's best soldiers. Due to his achievements during the attack, he quickly rose to the rank of captain, where he went into the reserve, but due to his recognized value, he was once again called up to fight. In 1645 he recruited, trained and led a force of 1,200 rebels, armed with firearms, scythes, sticks, bows and arrows, in an ambush in which they defeated 1,900 better-equipped Dutchmen. This success earned him the nickname "Master of Ambushes". For his achievements, he was awarded the honor of Knight of the Order of Christ and the command of João Fernandes Vieira's Third Corps, of which he had been an adjutant at the time of the 1st Battle of Guararapes. In 1656, he was appointed Master of the Field, definitively ending his military career. In 1657, he took over the government of the Captaincy of Paraíba. As he operated in the past in the manner of today's special forces troops, fighting in smaller numbers, without a fixed position, using surprise as a combat element, recruiting the local population and training them in irregular techniques such as guerrilla warfare, among other things, he was honoured as the patron saint of the Brazilian Army's 1st Special Forces Battalion and is currently recognized as Brazil's first special forces operator.

== See also ==
- Dutch invasions in Brazil
- Second Battle of Guararapes
- First Battle of Guararapes
- Military history of Brazil
- Dutch–Portuguese War
