= Batalha dos Guararapes =

Painting by Victor Meirelles

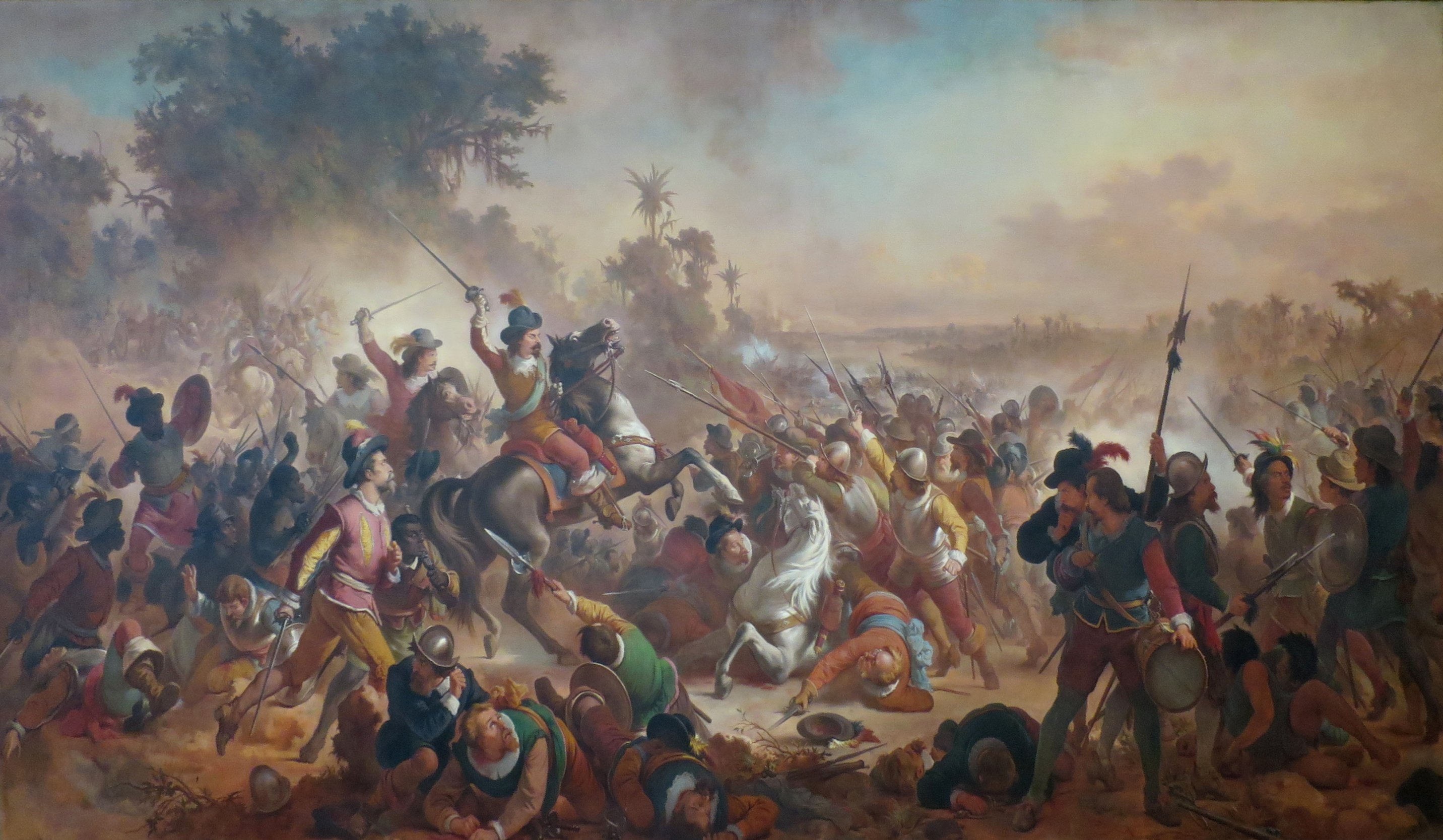
- Artist: Victor Meirelles
- Year: 1875–1879
- Medium: Oil on canvas
- Dimensions: 500 cm × 925 cm (200 in × 364 in)
- Location: Museu Nacional de Belas Artes, Rio de Janeiro

Batalha dos Guararapes (English: Battle of Guararapes) is an oil painting created between 1875 and 1879. It represents a history painting from the first confrontation of the Battle of Guararapes that took place in the 17th century in the Captaincy of Pernambuco, which culminated with the banishment of the Dutch invaders from Brazilian lands. The canvas was painted by the Brazilian artist and professor of historical painting Victor Meirelles and the scene represents the victory of the Brazilian troops against the Dutch on April 19, 1648, in the first of the two confrontations that occurred in that battle, fought in the region of Guararapes Hill. The second confrontation would be fought months later at the same location, on February 19, 1649, leading to the definitive expulsion of the Dutch troops from the colony, which would only occur in January 1654, with the signing of their capitulation.

Initially, the painting on the battle would have been assigned to the painter Pedro Américo from Paraíba, commissioned by the Minister of the Empire João Alfredo Correia de Oliveira. Once the proposal was accepted, the painter went to Italy and stayed at the Convent Santissima Annunziata, Florence to start the painting. Pedro Américo gave up painting the commissioned battle and decided to do a canvas portraying the Paraguayan War, which would be called the Battle of Avaí. With this decision, the minister transferred the commission to Victor Meirelles in 1872:

Meirelles' work is one of the historical paintings that circulated most in Brazil, along with canvases such as First Mass in Brazill, also by him, and Independence or Death, by Pedro Américo. It was shown at the 25th General Exposition of the Imperial Academy of Fine Arts in 1879, in Rio de Janeiro, to some three hundred thousand visitors. There were also works by Pedro Americo in the exhibition, such as the Battle of Avaí, both representing victorious episodes in the "national military history". The exhibition, which at first highlighted the qualities of the paintings, displayed side by side, began to be marked by an atmosphere of rivalry between the authors, instigated by the opinions of the press.

This battle also has the particularity of being the first moment of national communion in Brazilian history, with regard to the defense of the territory against invaders. It represents the union of the Brazilian people in favor of a national feeling. This interpretation about the Dutch invasion was built in the 19th century, based on the historiographic production of the Brazilian Historic and Geographic Institute (IHGB), creating the "visual memory of the nation". The frequent Dutch and foreign invasions in general, caused a national bond that united the three ethnic groups that formed the colony's society at the time, aligning white Europeans (Portuguese), indigenous and blacks, in a common goal: the expulsion of the Dutch not only from that region, which would later be called Northeast Brazil, but also from the whole territory of the still colony of Portugal. It was a historically important event to portray and that would be, more than 170 years later, one of the strongest inspirations for the formation of the Brazilian Army.

== Author ==
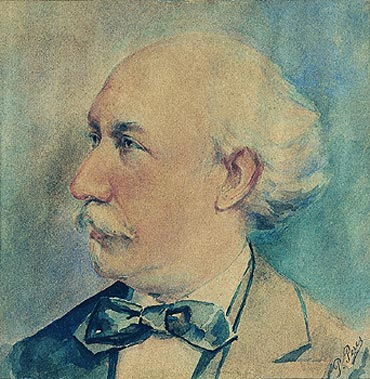
Victor Meirelles around 1900. By Pedro Peres

Victor Meirelles (1832–1903) was born in Nossa Senhora do Desterro (now Florianópolis), in the then Province of Santa Catarina. At the age of six he began his artistic studies and at the age of fifteen he moved to Rio de Janeiro, then capital of the Empire, to study at the Imperial Academy of Fine Arts (Portuguese: Academia Imperial de Belas Artes, AIBA), specializing in historical painting. He perfected his technique in Europe, studying in Rome and Paris for seven years. In the latter city, he produced his painting Primeira Missa no Brasil (English: First Mass in Brazil), considered by critics to be the first great work of Brazilian art. He returns to Brazil in 1861 and, in the following year, is appointed professor of historical painting at Imperial Academy of Fine Arts. Before Batalha dos Guararapes, Meirelles had already painted Indian themes, such as Moema, in 1866, and other historical episodes of battles, such as Passagem de Humaitá (English: Humaitá Passageway) and Batalha do Riachuelo (English: Riachuelo Battle), between 1869 and 1872. In 1885, he founded a company to produce panoramic images of Rio de Janeiro and from then on began to dedicate himself to this style of painting. With the restructuring of AIBA, after the Proclamation of the Republic in 1889, Meirelles was exonerated from his position as professor and went through a period of "marginalization", for having been the official artist of the monarchic period. However, he left a legacy considered important by critics for several artists of the second half of the 19th century, after almost thirty years as a professor. Regretting that his works had been forgotten, he began to hold public exhibitions of his panoramic paintings to support himself until his death a few years later.

== Description ==
Batalha dos Guararapes, oil on canvas full-color work, is kept in the collection of the Museu Nacional de Belas Artes, in Rio de Janeiro, and measures 500 cm by 925 cm. It depicts one of the battles between the Portuguese and the Dutch that took place on the Guararapes Hill, on Brazilian soil, during Brazil's colonial period. The title of the painting refers to the name given to the battle, relating it to the name of the place where it took place: Morro dos Guararapes.

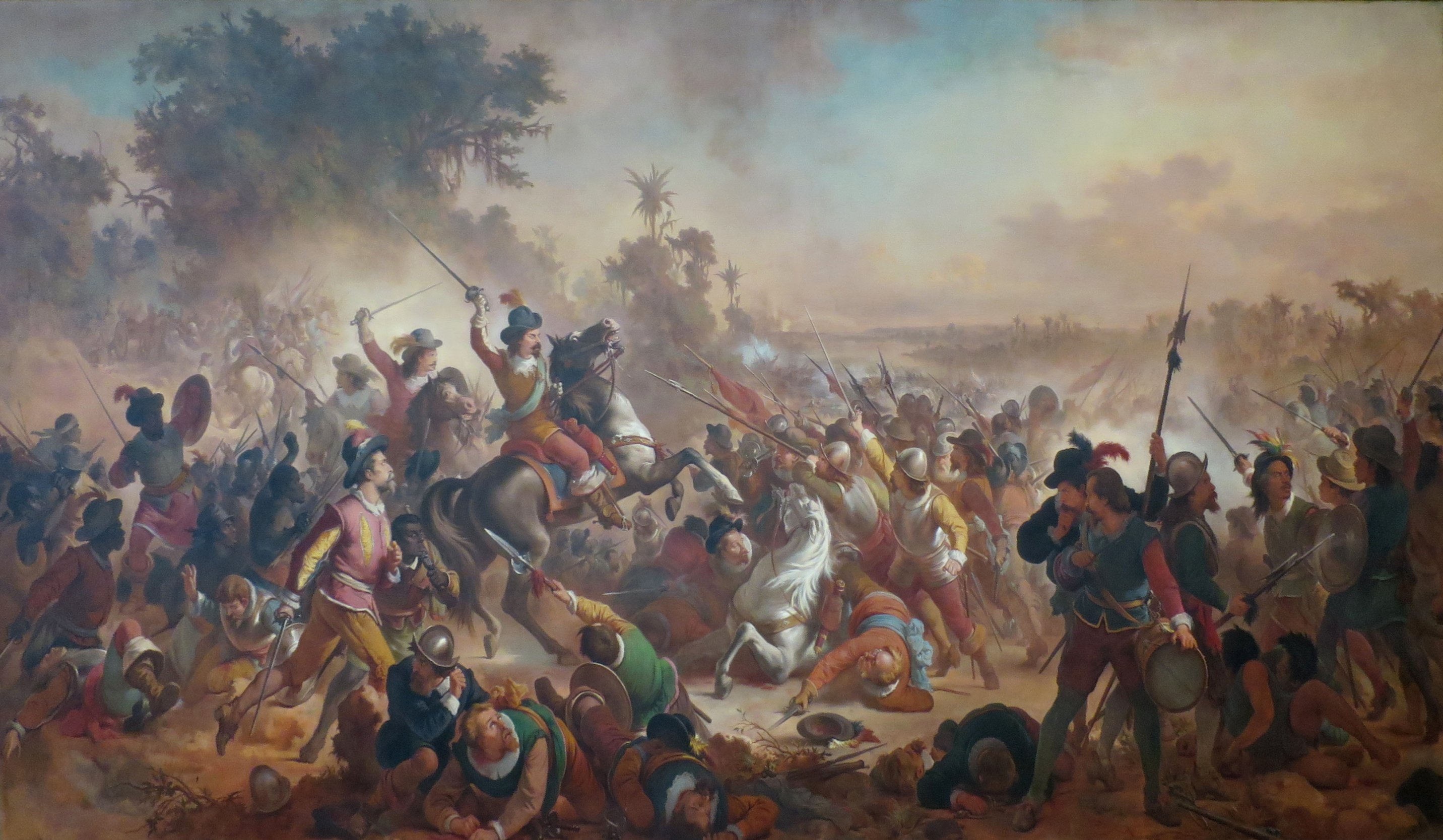
Batalha dos Guararapes, 1879, oil on canvas, Museu Nacional de Belas Artes

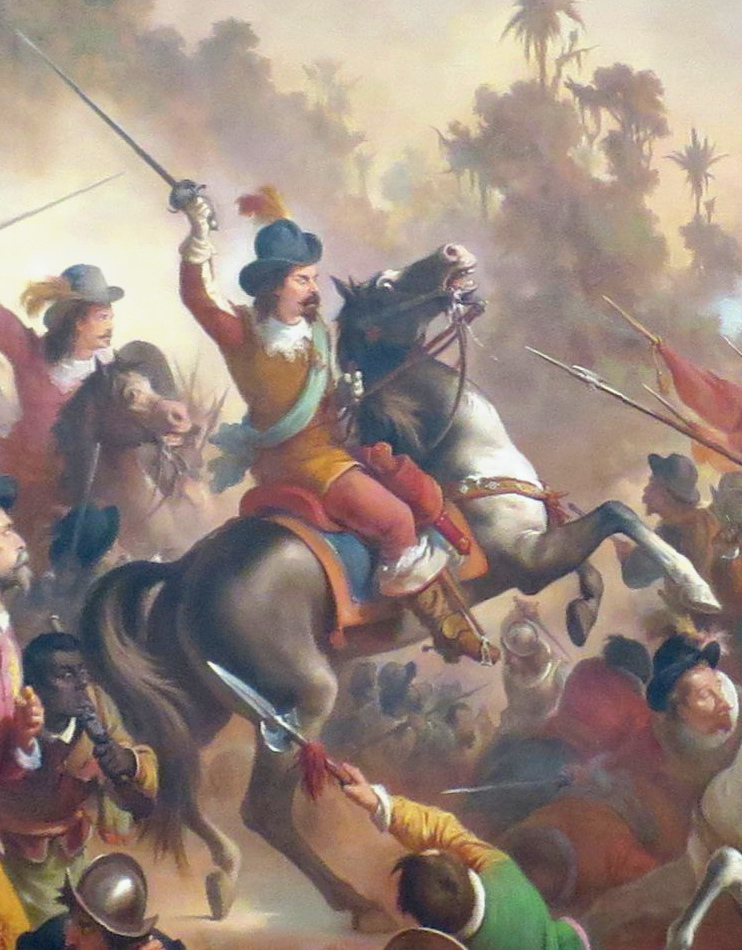
André Vidal de Negreiros in detail. From the painting Batalha dos Guararapes (Victor Meirelles)

Centrally and prominently, there is André Vidal de Negreiros, field master of the Portuguese Army, brandishing his sword, mounted on a brown and white horse that prances at the moment captured by the artist, making his image taller than any other. At the same time, the master strikes a blow with his sword against the Dutch colonel Keeweer, who looks at him stunned, lying on the ground. This is the nerve center of the scene. Around the central content, many warriors with various spears, flags and swords face each other, having a concentration of men around the confrontation of the two chiefs. The battle is being won by the Portuguese army that is arranged on the left side of the picture, and on the right side, several Dutch dead, wounded on the ground and others still in the middle of the duel, with their bodies leaning forward, which directs the viewer's gaze. Next to the battered colonel, there are warriors protecting him from the Portuguese master, covering him like in a barricade and pointing their weapons at the enemy. The Dutch colonel's white horse is lying wounded on the ground. Meirelles also depicts the military strategies used and, in this way, exposes the Dutch warriors, who were arranged in several human bands, creating army phases.

Right behind André Vidal, there is the commander of the troop, Barreto de Menezes, also mounted on horseback, showing his sword and going to capture the governor of the Dutch, Sigismund von Schkopp. On the right side, some warriors further away from the chaos of the battle in the center, observe and comment on the scene. The Dutch, as well as the Portuguese, all white-skinned, wear colorful clothes, in various shades: red, green, yellow, blue, orange, brown, gray, black, and white, colors that call attention in their clothes of thick fabrics, showy, detailed, with feathers, belts, trim, leather boots. They also wear iron armor and have numerous pieces of equipment such as shields, spears, and swords, the latter aimed at the enemy. The Portuguese army is composed of white-skinned Portuguese and some indigenous and black men who are poorly represented, wear simple clothes, some are even unarmored. The white men have horses, and the dark-skinned fight all on the ground.

To the left, towards the land of the scenery, there are a group of Portuguese soldiers on horseback in the background, ferociously approaching the combat zone. These are depicted with more muted colors that blend with the vegetation and a surrounding dust. On the lower side of the canvas, on the dirt floor with some bloodstains, are several wounded men, dead, lying among some dry branches, abandoned weapons and pieces of clothing. Others, also on the ground, are watching and protecting themselves from the battle, helpless. All the chaos and movement of the scene raises a dust produced by the earthen floor, which involves the whole picture, causing a frame effect of penumbra. Filipe Camarão and Henrique Dias occupy the sides of the canvas, right and left respectively. The groups of warriors slowly disappear into the open space in the background. They are represented in a smaller size and with neutral colors which generates a visual effect of depth and grandeur of the battle, as if it were not possible to portray the size of the battle itself, but a specific cut: the Portuguese Vidal de Negreiros' blow against the Dutch Keeweer.

The meeting of the armies takes place in the foreground, on the Guararapes Hill, a place with tall trees, an earthy, wide flat ground. The landscape occupies the upper left corner of the screen with an immense blue sky that carries clouds and composes together with the gray dust. Meirelles composes the topography of the region and inserts in the background, in the third plane, Cabo de Santo Agostinho, the place that represents the reason for the confrontation between the two groups. In this more distant plane, a technique of depth is used with the use of a palette of dull colors, white and little sharpness, unlike the center and foregrounds where there is more sharpness and bright colors. One notices a nature composed of various species of trees, and the flow of the sea toward the mountainous horizon.

The language used by Meirelles is clear and seeks to be faithful to the event and the place, with the intention of rescuing the spirit of an era from its vestiges, since the paintings of battles became, at that time, ways of documenting real exploits, and recording them as an eyewitness account. Artistic realism from the 19th century onward becomes a fundamental characteristic in works, notably in historical painting. The ability to capture the "real" takes precedence over the didactic function, although not completely. Themes focused on national history became a constant, gradually replacing the interest in religious themes, and there was a greater need to consult sources that would help compose the painting as faithfully as possible, within its historical context.

== Process and inspirations ==
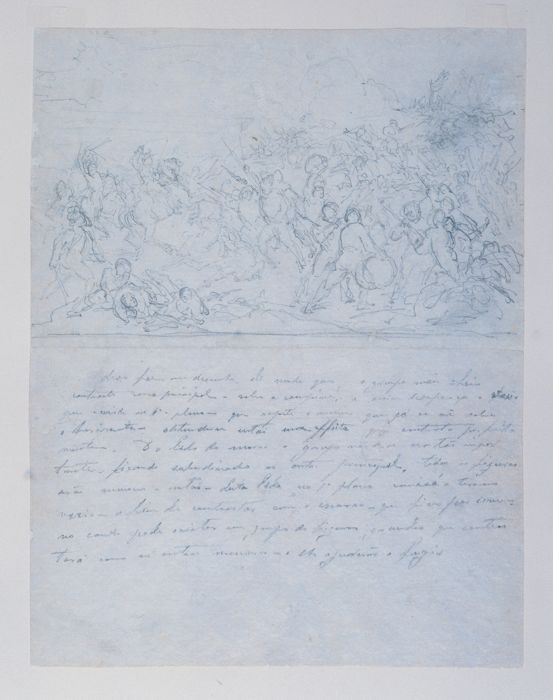
Study and notes for the painting.

For the execution, Meirelles carried out some research work. One of them was to go to the Instituto Arqueológico, Histórico e Geográfico Pernambucano (English: Archeological, Historical and Geographical Institute of Pernambuco), where he could visualize and research about weapons and other utensils present in his canvas. Another research he did was through the collection of the National Historical Museum, where there are several defense equipment, copies of war instruments, on which Meirelles could take as reference to produce the painting.

So in the three months or so that he lived in Recife, he often went to Guararapes, where he spent whole days; He went around Olinda, knocking from door to door, so to speak, in search of some paintings depicting the battle he was going to paint, and only after a long time could he find them, ruined, thrown into a corner, detached, since they are painted on wood, representing two battles, the two battles of Guarapes and the third one of Tabocas; he went to Iguarassu, because he had been told about paintings commemorating the Dutch war; he went to Cabo Santo Agostinho; he visited in the capital all the paintings in the church of S. Cosme and S. Damião. Cosme and S. Damião; he went to Cabo de Santo Agostinho; he visited in the capital all the buildings bequeathed by the Batavians. He studied everything, asked everything for inspiration, and tried to take possession through the physical remains of the spirit that presided over them.

Being a historical work, the artist used as one of his main sources, the narrative of the Brazilian historian Francisco Adolfo de Varnhagen, História das Lutas dos Holandeses no Brasil (English: History of the Fights of the Dutch in Brazil). With the countless information and details on how the battle presented in this narrative would be arranged, Meirelles composed his painting in three parts, according to the position of the Portuguese army. The care taken to be faithful to the event made Meirelles' work not only a representation of a national historical episode, but a kind of window to that past.

The link between the narrative and the painting is so developed that a relationship between image and word is achieved. The influence is so present that the painting is not limited to just exposing the military strategy described in the narrative but also represents the moment as a combat between heroes rather than between civilized and barbarians. According to French historian Christiane Raynaud, "Batalha dos Guararapes seems to become an image-copy of História das Lutas dos Holandeses no Brasil." The idea of image-copy is also noted through the historical summary that accompanies the screen, as a kind of translation through image, when paraphrasing Varnhagen's text.

The mention of the historian's work was a strategy used by Meirelles to legitimize his narrative. The instrument of citing renowned historians, eyewitness accounts, or even the artist's own personal experiences at the time of the battle itself, or the on-site observation of the place where it took place, is several times applied by painters to show references of their visual creation. These mechanisms confirm the narrative as true and demarcate the limit of verisimilitude in a historiographic painting, making the image more believable.

== Historical context ==
Batalha dos Guararapes painting is set in the imperial period of Brazil, more specifically in the second reign of Dom Pedro II, produced a few years after the end of the Paraguayan War. The painting is in tune with a desire brought about by the period, a political-ideological-cultural project affirmed by the Imperial Academy of Fine Arts together with the Brazilian Historic and Geographic Institute, which was concerned with the construction of a visual Brazilian nationality that incorporated images of the past with struggles and heroes.

There was, in the Brazil of the Second Empire, the need for a new political legitimization, since the region now had more independence from Portugal and, at this moment, the great stories of national formation gained importance and notoriety.

The Imperial Academy of Fine Arts in Rio de Janeiro received several artistic manifestations, such as neoclassicism, impressionism and romanticism, especially between the 1850s and 1920s, fitting Meirelles' works into the latter aesthetic, since he was part of the first generation of national romantic painters, along with Pedro Américo, Almeida Junior, Rodolfo Amoedo, Henrique Bernardelli and others. Despite being appropriately characterized as a work of Brazilian romanticism, this current in Brazil greatly diluted and softened the passionate radicalism of the first Romantics, considered unseemly and unsuitable for the purposes of the State, besides being marked by a great eclecticism, incorporating a variety of influences from other schools. In the case of Meirelles and Batalha, Baroque and especially Neoclassical influences are noted. The first school, much studied by the artist in his formative period, is noted in the strong contrasts of light and shadow and in the predominance of color over drawing, elements that were recovered already by the early Romantics, and the second, in the balanced, rational, and undramatic organization of the scene. For Jorge Coli, trying to fit Meirelles' style into a specific school can be quite misleading, and tends to hinder the understanding of the complex context in which the painting emerged.

It is a time, above all, in which Brazil chooses its most memorable moments and exposes them to the world, in a theatrical way, in vibrant colors by the hands of its best artists. These painters, following the romantic aesthetic, strove to produce commemorative scenes in such a way as to direct the viewer's gaze to specific frames. By representing the past, Meirelles had a strong influence on the creation of the present and the future, because in a certain way he created, from images, what could be known about the history of the country. This is the pedagogy of his works and his intentions in relation to the way in which the Brazilian nation was organized, guided by a civilizing perspective. Through works that fed a collective memory, it was possible for the viewer to relate individual stories.

Painters such as Meirelles, one of the most sought after and considered one of the greatest expressions of 19th century academic art in Brazil, when feeding the idea of national identity in the Batalha dos Guararapes, had control not only of the looks to the past, but also of the projections of what would be the future of a country, together with the State, which was a contractor for these producers and commissioned these memories. In particular this combat, which occurred on April 19, 1648, was chosen by the author because it represents the feeling of patriotism, defeating his enemy with courage and bravery.

On the memorable day of April 19, 1648, destined to mark another triumph in testimony to how much the ardor and patriotism of a people can, wounded in their pride and that, firm in the true justice of the cause they defend, and by the faith with which they fight, they know they are victorious; the two armies were found facing each other for a fierce fight.

In portraying the Battle of Guarapes, he turns the battle itself into a mere backdrop for a scene in which a communion takes place between the past and the values of the present such as honor, patriotism, knowledge. This relationship of values with the past outlines a civilization composed in a commemoration. In this way, the 19th century is understood as guided by romanticism, with an aesthetic that guides the creation of the scenes. The success of the cultural policy propagated through his works can be identified if we analyze the popular reactions they caused, as well as their incorporation in national history textbooks. The paintings Batalha dos Guararapes and Batalha do Avai are part of a moment in which representations of glorious actions are becoming more frequent. With the Paraguayan War, starting in the 1870s, there was a change in relation to the figure that represented the hero. Previously the figure of the monarch, now anonymous heroes were also painted.

In depicting the Battle of Guararapes, I did not have in mind the fact of the battle, in the raw and ferocious aspect itself. For me, the battle was not that, it was a happy encounter, where the heroes of that time were all reunited. The "Guararapes" canvas is a debt of honor that we had to pay with knowledge, in memory of the valor and patriotism of those men. My end was all noble and the highest: it was necessary to treat that subject as a true historical picture, at the height that history deservedly consecrates that handful of patriots, which is recognized as their right.

With the Paraguayan War, a founding myth of the Brazilian nation was fed, based on a patriotism inherited from the victory of this combat. Thus, Meirelles' work received as one of its intentions, the reproduction of this idea: to report the union of white, indigenous and black people who came together in order to maintain national sovereignty. At the time the painting was made, one of the Empire's concerns was precisely the construction of this idea of union throughout the Brazilian nation. Another intention of the paintings commissioned in this period was to motivate the Brazilian population to forget the evils of war, because, even though they were victorious, they had lost many soldiers and still accounted for the losses. The scene portrayed in the painting was the consequence of an exhausting past for many people from Pernambuco, victims of the tyranny of the Dutch invasions in 1648. The frequent oppression and Desecration generated complaints and a feeling of revolt among Brazilians. For their legitimate rights and for the end of the Dutch exploitation, all classes gathered, generating an army of black, indigenous and white people. Thus, one can see in the painting, the joint presence of the leader of the indigenous, Filipe Camarão, the leader of the black, tshi and creoles, Henrique Dias, and the field masters André Vidal de Negreiros, João Fernandes Vieira and Barreto de Menezes, who commanded the whites. Among the reasons for the battle portrayed was the ambition of the Dutch for the region of Cabo de Santo Agostinho, known for its successful harvests.

The comparison between the two canvases caused many to side with Batalha dos Guararapes for the unity and clarity of the scene: a composition without unity does not exist; as a result, the painting Batalha dos Guararapes, notwithstanding its defects of execution, is first in the order of merit for many reasons, and especially for a very simple one – that of being the only one left in the field.

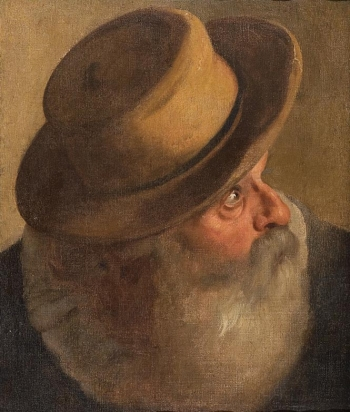
Study for a warrior

Meirelles was scientific in his work. He was based on the theories of Louis-François Lejeune, who disserted on military paintings. In the 17th century, the paintings of battles became a way of documenting the royal exploits, and of registering travels, with the artist as an eyewitness. This tradition was rescued by Lejeune with his work depicting the Battle of Marengo, with which conceptual parallels can be drawn with Meirelles' work.

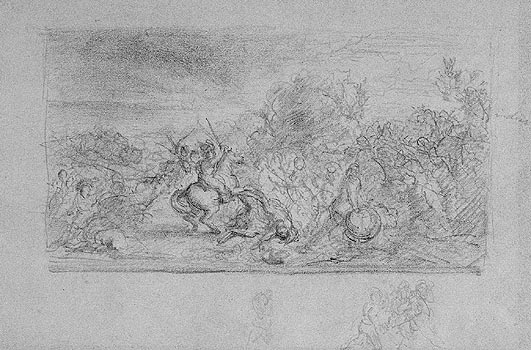
Sketch of the complete composition

One of the painter's concerns was to produce his work following the demand for historical accuracy. He paid attention to details that could provide historical information such as, for example, a faithful representation of the environment in which the battle took place, that is, the setting of the historical fact. Meirelles paid attention to the topography, the ruins and mountains that made up the region, so that the viewer could identify and recognize the place where the scene took place. In the background of the battle scene, on the horizon line, there is Cabo de Santo Agostinho.

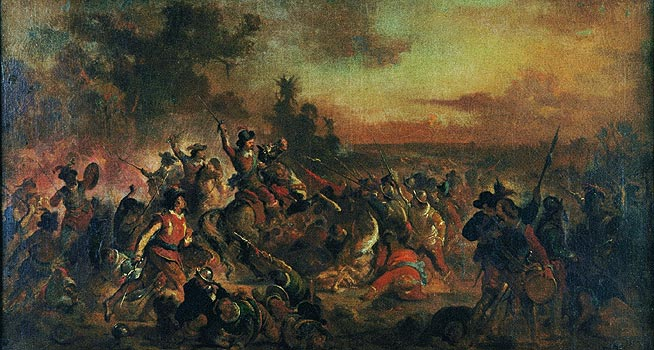
Study of the complete composition in smaller scale.

This region, according to Varnhagen's História das Lutas dos Holandeses no Brasil, was very important for the course of the battle depicted. There was Dutch interest in the area because it was a fertile region, which led to the battle at Morro dos Guararapes. The representation of Cabo de Santo Agostinho brings a historical summary of the moment and also clarifies the reader of the importance of the area at the time, being an element that refers to the author's official history and research.

It was rumored that the Dutch were preparing for a new attack, with the objective point of their exploration, with certain success of a better harvest, Cabo Santo Agostinho; located at a distance of 20 leagues away, south of Recife, which at that time was so distinguished by its great development. (...) Barreto de Menezes only had news of what had happened, summons the council that decides to leave immediately to meet the enemy (...) In the last plan, over the horizon, we can see the Cabo de Santo Agostinho.

Another form used by the author to legitimize the narrative of his work and bring it closer to the verisimilar was the representation of the military strategies adopted by the two armies, strategies which Meirelles already had some knowledge of. In this way, Batalha dos Guararapes cuts a specific moment in the plot, focusing on special actions and characters.

As requested, the author emphasized the victory and unity of the Portuguese army, helping to build the idea of the homeland's well-being and the foundation of a national identity. Despite the horror and violence also represented, national pride, patriotism, in a way, steals the scene. It is important to point out that although the idea of the union of ethnicities and peoples was addressed in the painting, this did not fail to be done in a hierarchical way, as demonstrated by the elements distributed on the screen. The white people were represented by figures such as the field masters André Vidal de Negreiros, João Fernandes Vieira, Dias Cardoso and Barreto de Menezes and Dias da Silva, the indigenous people by Filipe Camarão and the black people by Henrique Dias. Thus, the national history of miscegenation gained its first image with Victor Meirelles.

The representation of the royal army, emphasizing the white man as an example of civilization to be followed by the other races, was a trend of the 19th century tradition. The idea of unity was based precisely on the premise that the Brazilian nation, if united, would have the strength and opportunities to overcome any other civilization, confronting the movement of repudiation of the "other" in which the Brazilian nation was constituted. This "other", being foreign, was defined as barbaric and the idea that Brazilians represented the New World's ideal of civilization.

Guararapes operates a synthesis of the races in the same struggle and founds the first legitimization of a country that discovers itself as master of its political destinies. The warrior feat is the baptism of fire of this solidarity among Brazilians, and the guarantee of an unshakable feeling.

Even with a commitment to exaltation of national pride, Meirelles does not inferiorize the Dutch warriors, but rather, represents them with bravery and dignity even at the moment they are defeated, a detail that emphasizes the synchrony of the painting with the work of Francisco Adolfo de Varnhagen. Debating the criticism, the painter explains that his goal was to highlight all the heroes gathered together.

In depicting the Battle of Guararapes, I did not have in mind the fact of the battle in its cruel and ferocious aspect per se. For me, the battle was not this, it was the happy meeting where the heroes of that time were all reunited. The Guararapes canvas is a debt of honor that we had to pay, with recognition, in memory of the valor and patriotism of those illustrious men. My aim was all noble and the highest; it was necessary to treat that subject as a true historical picture, at the height that history deservedly consecrates to that handful of patriots who, driven by enthusiasm and love of the homeland, became notable meritorious. My concern was to highlight, in the way I thought most appropriate and worthy, the respective merit of each one of them, according to the importance that is rightfully recognized.

The painting carries the idea of national heroism extremely necessary for the time when it was released, late 19th century, when there were still reflections of the Paraguayan War in society and in the economy.

This set of motifs and aspirations was also an essential part of the academic tradition of historical painting, which has always been the most prestigious genre for scholars, considered the most noble and complete, and the ideal stage for the consecration of political and social ideologies, important also for its strong educational and moral associations. Moreover, in view of the difficulties of execution and its erudite character, the genre lent itself especially well to testify to the artist's superior culture and technical preparation. This tradition goes back to the time when the Imperial Academy was founded by a group of French artists, who sought to imitate in the New World the model of the famous French academy. Although historical painting took a long time to assert itself in Brazil, as of the 1840s the theme became much debated, especially within the scope of the Brazilian Historic and Geographic Institute, at the time the main space for the gestation and articulation of the ideological foundations of art sponsored by the State, the debate being characterized by a faithful alignment with the imperial nationalist program. For the members of the Institute and the Academy's leaders, as art historian Maraliz Vieira Christo states, "the continuity between past, present and future would be the thread that would weave the national memory". It fell to Victor Meirelles and his greatest rival, Pedro Américo, the role of main representatives of the tradition of historical painting in Brazil during the imperial period, in which the Battle is one of the most outstanding examples.

== Reception and criticism ==
=== Verisimilitude of the scene ===
Meirelles' work was the target of several criticisms and debates because it deals with a historical moment and there are different opinions about how it really occurred and should be represented. In 1879, Meirelles was accused of producing a misleading scene about the Dutch invasion. It was alleged that this event could not have been portrayed in such a peaceful manner. Different opinions on how the scene occurred conflicted with the research the author himself had done before creating the painting, such as his meticulous work in Pernambuco, where he conducted studies and research at the Instituto Arqueológico, Histórico e Geográfico Pernambucano (IAHGP) and was able to view weapons and other props that helped him in the making of the canvas.

One of the critics of the painting was the researcher Donato Mello Júnior (he was a professor, researcher, and architect, who contributed to the collection of the National Museum of Fine Arts), whose attacks on the works of Victor Meirelles and Pedro Américo were present at the 1879 exhibitions, with his publications of articles in pamphlets. Several critics specialized in plastic arts were divided in their opinions about the paintings and their authors. There were also publications by anonymous writers in newspapers, a resource allowed by the press in the 19th century, or pseudonyms, to destroy the artists' reputation and deny journalistic seriousness. The accusations were diverse, from plagiarism of the artists, to false or inappropriate representations of people, objects, props, scenes, alleging a lack of commitment to the painting's fidelity to the past.

Some of André Félibien's principles were adopted by Meirelles, in response to the accusation of lack of emotion in Batalha dos Guararapes, such as the theory of the principle of unity of the painting. This doctrine required an idealization in the composition so that all the figures were associated with and assisted in the characterization of the action of the hero portrayed, i.e., the entire cut should serve the central virtuous action at the same moment. This systematized rule would be applied in paintings of the historical genre, according to Félibien, a category that contributed too much to academic teaching besides enabling the painter a valuable status and social recognition.

Other principles also preached by André Félibien on the theory of painting were cited by Meirelles, in defense of his work, such as the importance of perspectives, of light and dark, of the ordering of figures, of proportions.

The artist felt the need to develop a chronicle with the objective of clarifying the European artistic tradition that his work followed, citing some precepts of the academic art which he followed for his production, and places as the main one the unity of composition. Meirelles says that his work brings a specific central clipping, and eliminates from his narrative anything that might confuse the understanding of the main message. Finally, he legitimizes all his production, claiming that it follows a tradition that only conceives works of art guided by the principle of unity.

The episodes, however picturesque and characteristic of a battle, whose end was only to represent the destruction or extermination of one race by another, could not, on the canvas Batalha dos Guararapes, contribute to excite the interest calculated by the artist, who only thought of drawing the spectator's attention to the main characters (...) Movement in the art of composing a picture is not, nor can it be taken in the sense that our critics want to give it. The movement results from the contrast of the figures among themselves and of the groups between each other; from this contrast, in the attitudes and in the variety of expressions, as well as in the well calculated effects of the masses of shadow and of light, by the perfect intelligence of perspective, which, by graduating the planes, also gives us the due proportion between the figures in their different distances, is born the nature of movement, under the aspect of verisimilitude, and not the mark of delirium.

In this way, Meirelles uses the knowledge of his artistic training, rich in doctrines of the pictorial tradition, and combines his research on the Batalha dos Guararapes, to assert that the figure is a credible representation, and not a source of his imagination. Another criticism he received was that made by Jornal do Commercio, in 1879, which accused the painter of representing models of weapons and clothing that belonged to a certain "Theater of Mr. Ferrari", and not the originals used at the time of the combat.

There are no models drawn in Brazil either, and like these indispensable objects for the making of a historical picture, many others are missing (...). With these elements or, better yet, with the lack of them, Mr. Vítor Meireles painted his Batalha dos Guararapes. Now, I ask, can anyone demand in this painting: exactness in the appearance of the main characters of the painting, absolute truth in the accessories, and meticulous correction in the nude drawing, when Vítor Meireles had at his disposal neither portraits, nor museums, nor models? On what can one fairly exercise severity for this painter's painting? Composition?

In response to the criticism, Rangel de Sampaio, a friend of Meirelles, recalls that the painter went to Pernambuco with the purpose of researching and, in fact, saw several artifacts from the period. Even without having them in abundance as in Europe, the Instituto Arqueológico, Histórico e Geográfico from Pernambuco stored models of the items in question. Besides the clothing and accessories, Sampaio also states that Meirelles examined the very place where the battle had taken place.

What Rangel de Sampaio says about Meireles' trip to Pernambuco: Conscientious as he is, attentive to the study of topography and all the physical accidents that are connected to the subjects he tries to immortalize on his canvases, he, commissioned to commemorate the Battle of Guararapes, went to examine the theater of action. And he did it well. The famous places, as it were, lend themselves to telling us of the glorious deeds they witnessed.

=== Representation of índio Filipe Camarão ===
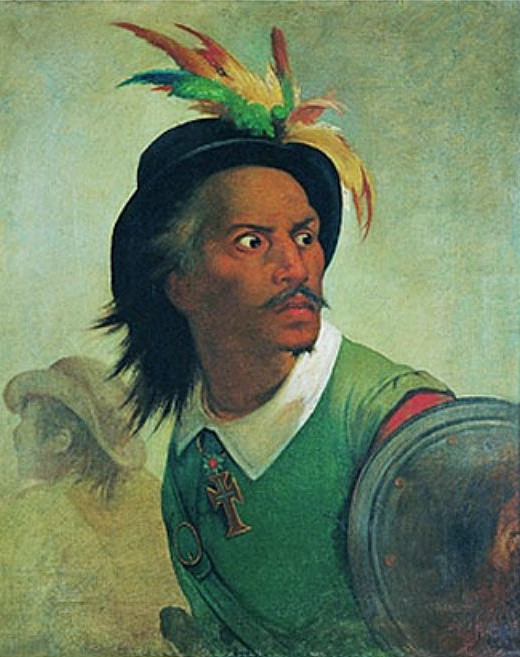
Filipe Camarão depicted in the painting.

Another criticism related to Meirelles' work was the contestation of the representation of índio Filipe Camarão, who, according to the critics, was badly drawn since his image, at the time he participated in the battle, did not present the joviality portrayed in the painting. Once again, the artist used Varnhagen's História das Lutas dos Holandeses no Brasil to justify himself. In this bibliography, the historian presents an analysis of Camarão's life, such as the year in which he died, the year in which he was baptized, the same year in which there was a dispute for the Crown in Portugal between two religious men, and the name Filipe was a tribute to them. This proves that Meirelles had not erred in his portrayal, for he himself contended that he had added more age to the figure of Camarão.

Other criticisms were made about the way in which Filipe Camarão was represented, especially at the time of the painting's execution, when his work received the most varied visitors. Many of the visitors thought it was inappropriate the way one of the heroes of the battle was portrayed, because he could never be portrayed as an old man or a decadent person, as this would run away from the idea of a national hero. At this point, there was a conflict between the moral function of the painting and its commitment to fidelity to the past. The figure of a hero should not be deconstructed but rather reinforced as an example for posterity. Thus, the painter should not be bound by such historical preciousness. For those visitors, the most important function of a work was its pedagogical role, even if this compromised its verisimilitude. However, after the polemic, the painter changed the image of the character.

One circumstance, however, which I thought I should not disregard, due to its respectful origin, was that it made me alter the physiognomy of the indigenous person in question, to give him the appearance that can be seen today on the Guararapes canvas and which is particularized as a defect... (...) Mr. Justice Tristão de Alencar Araripe, more than once honoring my "atelier" with his presence, also expressed his regret for seeing that character thus characterized. And I, who only want to get it right, because of the faith that the judicious observations deserved, and because it did not seem like obstinacy, understood I had to give in, modifying it in the sense in which I present it today.

Before giving in, Meirelles continued the debate, now basing his arguments on the work of French naturalist Alcide d'Orbigny, The American Man of South America. In this bibliography, it was stated that the indigenous people had a different aging process, which took place more slowly, as well as the manifestation of this passage of time in their aesthetics. Even at a hundred years old, they would remain with their youthful appearance.

More than one person has told me that Camarao, whom I had represented, in spite of his seventy years, could not be considered old, because he was an indigenous person, and that this northern race, so robust, only begins to show signs of old age after a hundred years, and still in support of such an assertion we have what d'Orbigny tells us in his work O homem americano da América Meridional (English: The American Man of South America).

The choice to represent Camarão with a jovial image, even though he was seventy years old, was based on sources consulted by Meirelles, by his pictorial knowledge and on the theme, and also on racial theories of the time, i.e., this act followed a historical scientific content. Thus, the representation of Camarão is a mark of enunciation of the painting that marked a moment of dialogue between historical painting and the discipline of history.

== See also ==
- Victor Meirelles
- First Battle of Guararapes
- Second Battle of Guararapes
