= Pernambuco insurrection =

Pernambuco insurrection may refer to:

- Insurrection of Pernambuco (1645)
- Pernambucan revolt (1817)
