= António Teles de Meneses =

Count of Vila Pouca de Aguiar

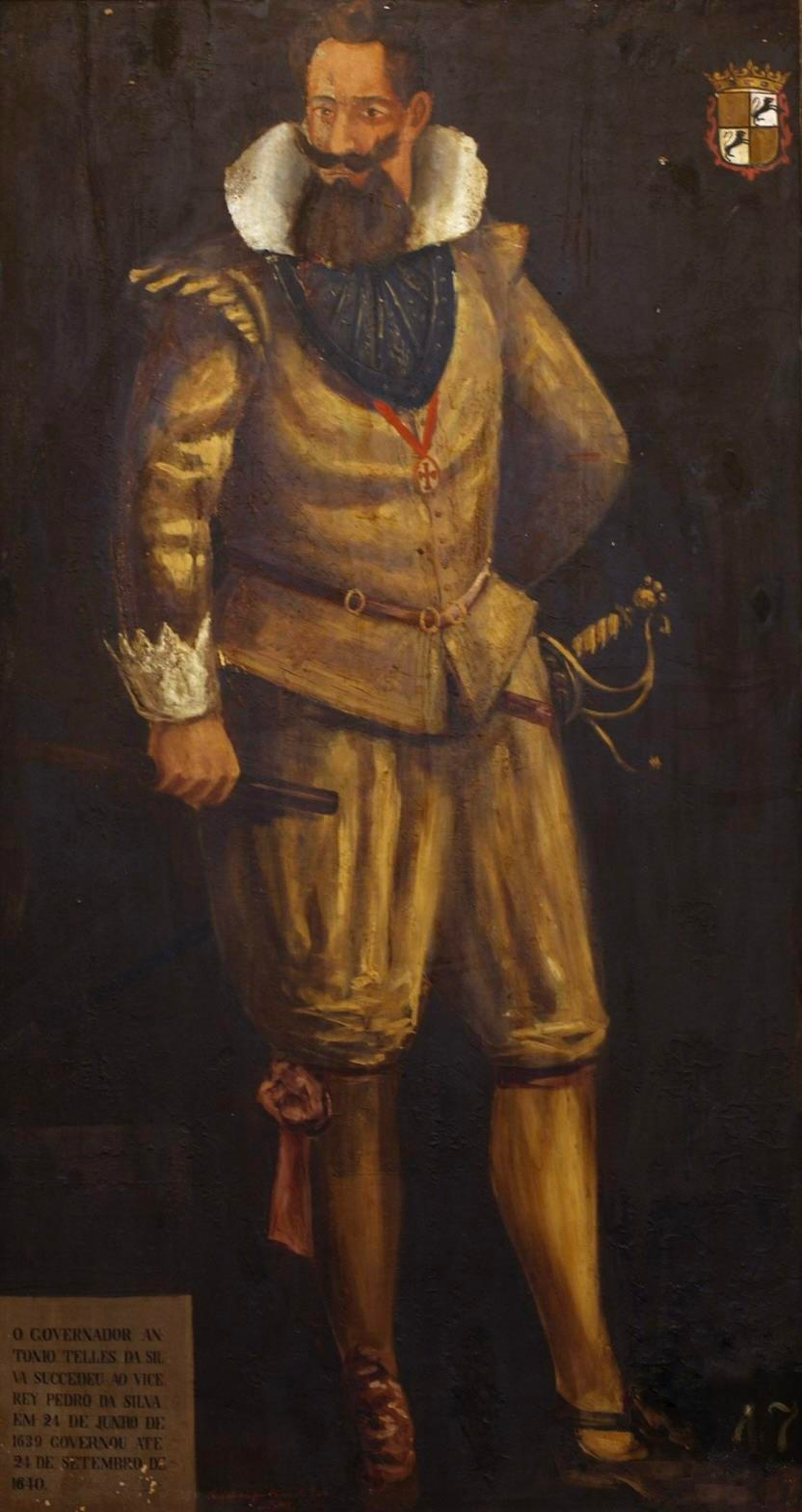

Governor of Portuguese India
- In office 24 June 1639 – 24 September 1640
- Succeeded by: João da Silva Telo e Meneses

Personal details
- Born: c. 1600 Kingdom of Portugal
- Died: July 1657 (aged 56–57)
- Occupation: Colonial administrator

António Teles de Meneses, 1st Count of Vila Pouca de Aguiar (c. 1600–July 1657) was a Portuguese nobleman and colonial administrator.

== Biography ==
Initially he served as captain of Diu, as general of the rowing and high-board armadas, then he was appointed 46th Governor of India in 1639, where he remained until 1640.

He should have returned at the end of that year to the Kingdom of Portugal, as History describes him as being one of the Forty Conjured who, in the revolution of 1 December 1640, reestablished the independence of Portugal in relation to the yoke of Castile.

He took office in Bahia as the 18th governor of Brazil on 26 December 1647.

He was the first count of Vila Pouca de Aguiar and had the task of helping the captaincy in the threat of colonel Sigismund van Schkoppe, to evict him from the city of Salvador, using the galleon Bom Jesus de Portugal to direct it. This plus the remaining beleaguered Dutch, who ended up abandoning the captaincy to go and help Pernambuco. The combination of diplomatic and military efforts resulted in the battle of Guararapes on 19 April 1648, in which the Dutch were defeated. The event marked the government of the Count of Vila Pouca.

It was also during his government that the General Company of Commerce of Brazil was created in Lisbon along similar lines to those of the Dutch West India Company.

After governing Brazil, he provided relief to Angola, where he was governor until 1652.

Upon returning to the Kingdom, he was appointed major ensign of D. João IV of Portugal and, again, viceroy of India, functions that he never performed as he was surprised by death while traveling to India to take up the new position.

Upon the king's death in 1656, he was one of the nobles who carried the sovereign's coffin.

In several lands of Portugal, says Veríssimo Serrão in «História de Portugal», volume V, page 115, "they made waves of men for their armada. In Coimbra and Esgueira there were soldiers who fled and others who excused themselves, citing that they were responsible for their widowed fathers and mothers. (...) At the same time, prisoners exiled from Limoeiro were ordered to embark for Maranhão, due to the lack of people in that captaincy (decree of 30 July 1648)".

== Viceroy (1657) ==
To face the Dutch offensive against the Portuguese State of India, in 1657, the Regent and her ministers decided to take the necessary measure: the reconstitution of the Portuguese India Armadas. António Teles de Meneses was appointed to the position of Viceroy, one of the rare sea chiefs that existed in Portugal. The armada left Lisbon on 4 April, but Meneses died during the journey. The armada reached Mormugao on 5 September and the Mandovi bar two days later.

== Genealogical data ==
D. António Teles de Meneses was the fifth son of Rui Teles de Meneses (c. 1560¬1616), 8th lord of Unhão, and of D. Mariana da Silveira.

He married twice, but had no legitimate descendants.

- 1st with D. Maria de Castelo Branco, heir daughter of D. Jorge de Castelo Branco, who was captain of Ormuz, and D. Maria de Mendonça.
- 2nd with his cousin D. Helena de Castro, daughter of Álvaro da Silveira, knight of the Order of Christ, and D. Ana de Castro.

He only had one son, illegitimate, from D. Maria Landrove, D. Aires Teles de Meneses. He would later join D. Joana Maria de Castro, who was the 2nd Countess of Vila Pouca de Aguiar.
