= Parque Histórico Nacional dos Guararapes =

Park in Brazil

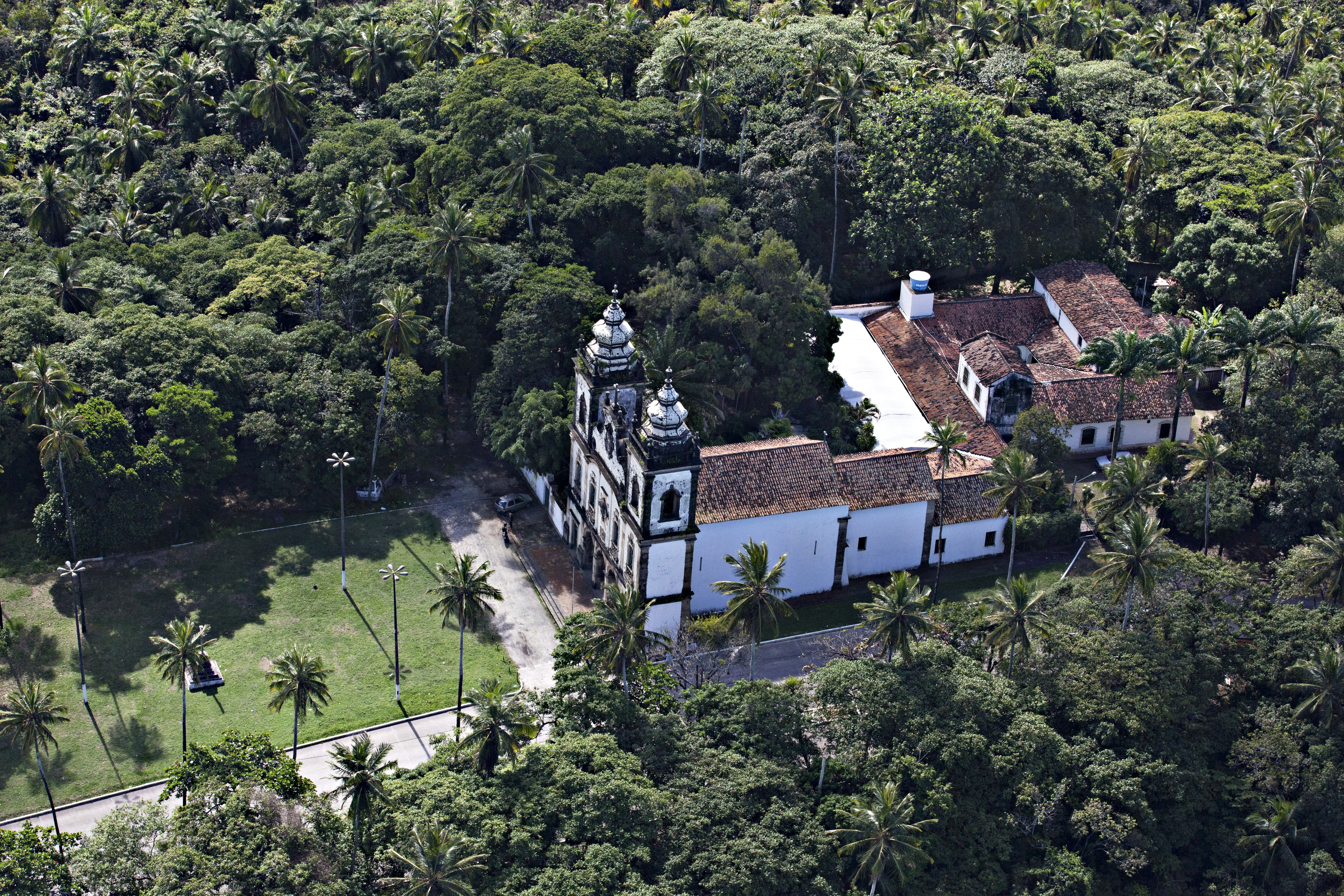
- Aerial view of the Church of Nossa Senhora dos Prazeres dos Montes Guararapes, on Guararapes Hill.

- Location within Brazil
- Location: Jaboatão dos Guararapes, Pernambuco, Brazil
- Coordinates: 8°8′54″S 34°55′28″W
- Area: 363 ha (900 acres)
- Designation

National Historic Heritage of Brazil
- Official name: Parque Histórico Nacional dos Guararapes
- Type: Historical garden
- Designated: 30 October 1962
- Reference no.: 0523-T-54
- Established: April 19, 1971 (52 years old)
- Governing body: FunCEB (Brazilian Army Cultural Foundation)

The Parque Histórico Nacional dos Guararapes (in English: Guararapes National Historical Park) (PHNG) is a historical park located in the municipality of Jaboatão dos Guararapes, in the Metropolitan Region of Recife, in the state of Pernambuco, Brazil.

The Morro dos Guararapes (Guararapes Hill), inside the park, was the scene of one of the most important episodes in Brazilian history: the Second Battle of Guararapes - decisive in the Insurrection of Pernambuco (the expulsion of the Dutch from the north-east of Brazil) and considered to be the origin of the Brazilian Army.

The Church of Nossa Senhora dos Prazeres dos Montes Guararapes, a baroque temple at the top of the hill, houses the remains of André Vidal de Negreiros and João Fernandes Vieira, two of the heroes of the battles fought there.

== History ==
The area where the Second Battles of the Guararapes were fought was listed in 1955 by the former National Historical and Artistic Heritage Board (DPHAN). In 1965, after the Federal Government paid compensation to the Benedictine monks of Olinda, the process of expropriating Morro dos Guararapes began. The expropriation order was made by Decree 57,273 of November 16, 1965, signed by President Humberto Castelo Branco and Education Minister Flávio Suplicy. The only land not expropriated was the Sanctuary of Nossa Senhora dos Prazeres do Montes Guararapes and the surrounding 10 hectares. The site is owned by the Monastery of São Bento de Olinda, which was donated in a deed dated November 8, 1956 by Francisco Barreto de Menezes.

On May 10, 1970, during the inauguration of the Marechal Manoel Luiz Osório Historical Park, President Emílio Médici declared his desire to soon inaugurate the Guararapes National Historical Park as "an act of civility." Army General Arthur Duarte Candal instructed the 4th Army Command to speed up the creation of the first Guararapes National Historical Park. The research team for the Second Battle of Guararapes also included three cadets from the Agulhas Negras Military Academy (AMAN) and university students from the Guararapes Rondon Project. The studies were carried out with the collaboration of the Ministry of Agriculture, the Ministry of Education and Culture, the Ministry of the Interior, the Ministry of Transport, the Government of Pernambuco and the Government of Recife.

Decree 68,527 of April 19, 1971, signed by President Emílio Médici, Minister of Education Jarbas Passarinho and Minister of Mines and Energy José Costa Cavalcanti, created the Guararapes National Historical Park, subordinated to the National Historical and Artistic Heritage Institute (IPHAN) of the Department of Cultural Affairs of the Ministry of Education and Culture. The National Housing Bank was responsible for building a residential center for the families who had previously lived on the land.

The inauguration speaker was Gilberto Freyre. Flags were brought from the states of all the participants, which were flown together with the flags of Brazil and Portugal. The books As Batalhas dos Guararapes, descrição e análise militar and A Grande festa dos lanceiros, written by Cláudio Moreira Bento, then an engineering major at Escola de Comando e Estado-Maior do Exército (ECEME) and a trainee in the 4th Army Command were launched. The 2000 copies of As Batalhas dos Guararapes were distributed among the authorities present at the event, as well as Brazilian and foreign libraries and universities on the Federal University of Pernambuco list. The author believes that the action inspired the restoration of historical sites linked to the Insurrection of Pernambuco. A Festa dos Lanceiros, on the other hand, associates the Marechal Manoel Luís Osório Parks in Rio Grande do Sul with the Guararapes National Park.

By decree of March 24, 1974, on the anniversary of the First Battle of Guararapes and the creation of the Guararapes National Historical Park, President Itamar Franco and Army Minister Zenildo de Lucena established the Brazilian Army Day. Zenildo's administration was marked by the preservation and dissemination of army history.

== See also ==
- Catimbau National Park
- Fernando de Noronha
