= Francisco Barreto de Meneses =

Portuguese general (1616–1688)

Francisco Barreto
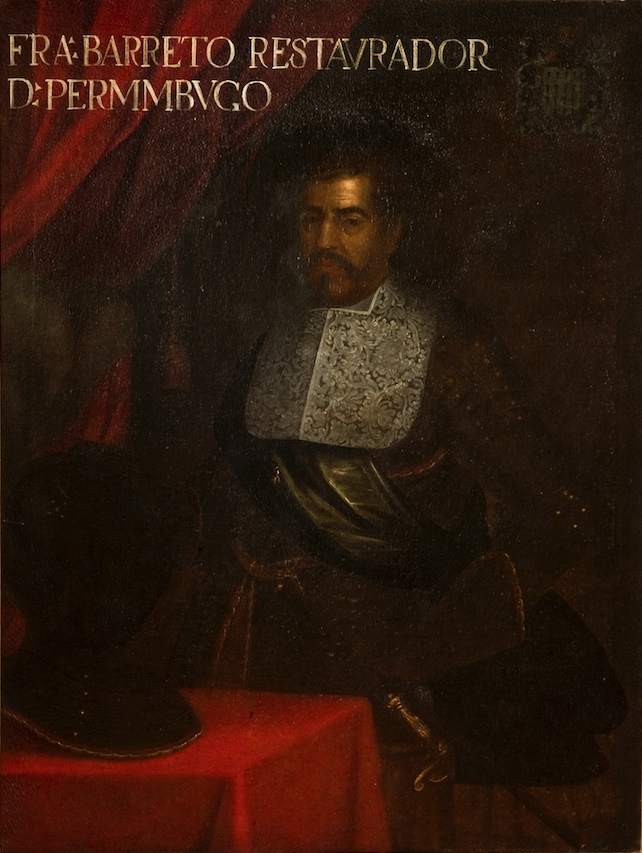
- Portrait by Feliciano de Almeida, c. 1673–1675

Governor of São Tomé and Príncipe
- In office 1632–1632
- Monarch: Philip III of Portugal
- Preceded by: Lourenço Pires de Távora
- Succeeded by: Lourenço Pires de Távora

Governor of Pernambuco
- In office 28 January 1654 – 26 May 1657
- Monarch: John IV of Portugal
- Preceded by: Dutch occupation
- Succeeded by: André Vidal de Negreiros

Governor-General of Brazil
- In office 18 June 1657 – 21 July 1663
- Monarch: Afonso VI of Portugal
- Preceded by: Jerónimo de Ataíde
- Succeeded by: Vasco de Mascarenhas

Personal details
- Born: 1616 Viceroyalty of Peru
- Died: 21 January 1688 (aged 71–72) Lisbon

Military service
- Allegiance: Portuguese Empire
- Branch/service: Army
- Rank: General
- Battles/wars: Dutch-Portuguese War: First Battle of Guararapes; Second Battle of Guararapes

Francisco Barreto de Meneses (1616 – 21 January 1688) was a Portuguese military officer and a colonial administrator in the colonies of São Tomé and Príncipe and Brazil.

He was born during the Iberian Union and his Portuguese father was a military officer at Peru. A brave soldier, he was chosen to command the colonial troops in the uprising that took place in Pernambuco which drove out the Dutch from the Northeast of Brazil, finishing the 24-year-long Dutch occupation of Brazil.

He arrived in the colony of Brazil in 1647, was arrested but managed to escape. With the rank of "Master-of-Field-General" (in Portuguese Mestre-de-Campo-General) he commanded the "Patriot Army" of 25,000 men, composed of four terços, led by Fernandes Vieira, Vidal de Negreiros, Henrique Dias and Filipe Camarão, beating the Dutch in the First and Second Battle of Guararapes in 1648 and 1649. For such achievement he was awarded with the title of "Restorer of Pernambuco".

He was Governor of Pernambuco and later, from 18 June 1657 to 1663, General-Governor of Brazil, succeeding D. Jerónimo de Ataíde, 6th Count of Atouguia.
