= Joaquim Veríssimo Serrão =

Portuguese historian (1925–2020)

Joaquim Veríssimo Serrão (8 July 1925 – 31 July 2020) was a Portuguese historian. Serrão was a Professor Emeritus of the Faculty of Letters of Lisbon University, was dean of the University of Lisbon from 1973 to 1974, and president of the Portuguese Academy of History between 1975 and 2006. He received the Príncipe de Asturias Prize for Social Science in 1995.

Serrão was born in Tremês, Portugal on 8 July 1925. From 1977, he published a history of Portugal from the remote origins of the country until the period of the Estado Novo. This work initially concerned the history of Portugal until the end of the First Republic in 1926, and was completed in 1990 in twelve volumes. However, from 1997, the work was continued from the period of the Estado Novo and was completed with nineteen volumes, ending with the present day.

He died in Tremês on 31 July 2020, at the age of 95.

== See also ==
- Académie Belgo-Espagnole d'Histoire
