= Battle of Tabocas =

1645 battle

- Part of the Insurrection of Pernambuco
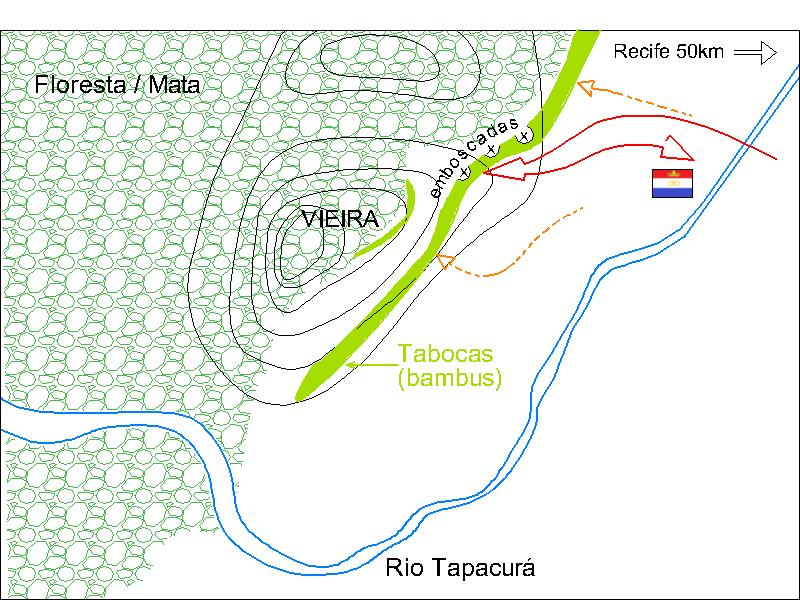
- Map of the battle
Date	3 August 1645
Location	Vitória de Santo Antão, Pernambuco, Brazil
Result	Portuguese victory

Belligerents
Dutch Republic	Kingdom of Portugal

Commanders and leaders
(Dutch West India Company) Hendrik van Haus	(Portugal) João Fernandes Vieira

Strength
1,100 men	900 men (including 200 Native allies)

Casualties and losses
Unknown	Unknown

The Battle of Tabocas, also known as the Battle of Mount Tabocas, was fought between the Dutch and the Portuguese army.

The battle took place on Mount Tabocas, in the Hereditary Captaincy of Pernambuco, on 3 August 1645. It was won by the Portuguese forces. The battle was the first major victory in the nine-year period of war that would lead to the retreat of the Dutch from Northeastern Brazil.
