= Second Battle of Guararapes =

Part of the Pernambucana Insurrection (1649)

Coordinates: 08°06′44″S 35°00′56″W

- Part of the Insurrection of Pernambuco
- 1758 ex-voto depicting the Second Battle of Guararapes
Date	19 February 1649
Location	Pernambuco, Brazil
Result	Portuguese victory

Belligerents
WIC	Kingdom of Portugal; State of Brazil

Commanders and leaders
(Dutch West India Company) Van Den Brinck †	Francisco Barreto; Filipe Camarão; Henrique Dias; Vidal de Negreiros

Strength
3,500	2,600

Casualties and losses
1,045: 1,045 killed, wounded or captured	245: 45 killed 200 wounded

The Second Battle of Guararapes was the second and decisive battle in the Insurrection of Pernambuco between Dutch and Portuguese forces in February 1649 at Jaboatão dos Guararapes in Pernambuco. The defeat convinced the Dutch "that the Portuguese were formidable opponents, something which they had hitherto refused to concede." The Dutch still retained a presence in Brazil until 1654 and a treaty was signed in 1661.

== Background ==
Facing an uprising by the Portuguese planters in Dutch Brazil and having concluded a Peace Treaty with the Spanish in 1647, the Dutch sent an expeditionary force to Brazil, consisting of 41 ships with 6000 men. This expeditionary force arrived late in Recife (Mauritsstad) and faced numerous problems. In April 1648, the Portuguese routed the expeditionary force at the First Battle of Guararapes, fought outside Recife.

== History ==
The Dutch forces, led by Colonel Brinck, left Recife on 17 February 1649, and fought the Portuguese at Guararapes Plain on 19 February. Though the Dutch West India Company fielded a larger, better equipped force, they suffered morale problems as most of their army was made up of mercenaries from Europe (primarily Germany) who felt no real passion for the war in Brazil, as opposed to the Natives and Portuguese settlers who considered Brazil to be their home and were fighting for a patriotic cause. The Dutch force were also unused to fighting in the dense jungle and humid conditions of the country, wearing thick, brightly coloured European clothing and heavy metal armour which inhibited their dexterity. Contemporary accounts describe Dutch troops at the battle as "pale and sickly". The Dutch army at Guararapes were armed with pikes, cannons, and an assortment of bladed weapons. It is thought by historians that the use of short blades by the Dutch was an attempt to imitate previously successful Portuguese weaponry and tactics.

The Portuguese force was made up of an assortment of natives, blacks, and whites who knew, and had experience fighting in, the difficult Brazilian terrain. They weakened Dutch troops with fusillades of musketfire from behind trees, and then charged with mêlée weapons.

The Dutch had expected the enemy to march down the well established coastal roads, and thus formed a line of defence covering these roads. However, the Portuguese force used a series of minor trails to reach Pernambuco, appearing out of the wetlands to the west and Guararapes Hills (from which the battle derived its name) and flanking the Dutch. After several hours of fighting, the Dutch retreated northwards to Recife, leaving their artillery behind. Following the Dutch retreat, the Portuguese army marched into Pernambuco.

An eyewitness account of the Dutch defeat by Michiel van Goch written a few days after the battle notes

The enemy's men [the Portuguese forces] are naturally agile and surefooted, able to advance or retreat speedily. They are also formidable from their natural ferocity, consisting as they do of Brazilians, Tapuyas, Negroes, Mamelucos, etc., all natives of this country; as also Portuguese and Italians, whose constitution enables them to adapt themselves very readily to the terrain, so that they can range the woods, cross the swamps, and climb or descend the hills (all of which natural obstacles are very numerous here), and that with remarkable speed and agility. Our [Dutch] men, on the contrary, fight ranged in serried ranks, after the manner of the fatherland, and they are sluggish and flabby, unsuited to this kind of country.

With the defeats of the Dutch in the two battles, and the further setback of the Portuguese Recapture of Angola, which crippled the Dutch colony in Brazil as it couldn't survive without the slaves from Angola, opinion in Amsterdam considered that "Dutch Brazil by now no longer had a future worth fighting for," which "effectively sealed the fate of the colony."

The participation of Henrique Dias and indigenous leader Filipe Camarão resulted in them receiving honors from the Portuguese crown.

== Depictions in art ==
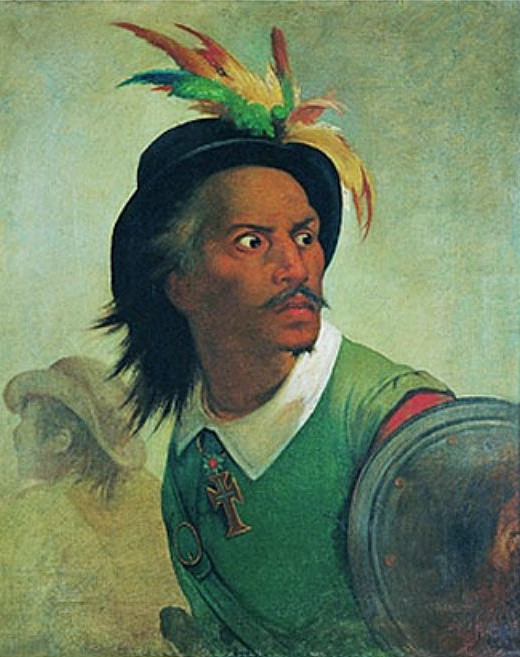
Portrait of Filipe Camarão, by Victor Meirelles, oil on canvas, ca. 1874–78, Museu Victor Meirelles

Antwerp painter Gillis Peeters painted an image of the battle in 1650, showing the rocky landscape and combat between Dutch soldiers armed with rifled and stereotypical Amerindians with bows and arrows. Nineteenth-century Brazilian painter Victor Meirelles produced a vivid image of the battle as well as a portrait of Filipe Camarão, as Brazil claimed its role in defeating the Dutch. A painting depicting the Battle of Guararapes is located in the lower choir of the Church of Our Lady of the Conception of the Military in Recife.

== Important participants ==
- Henrique Dias - Son of slaves, he was the governador da gente preta (governor of the black people), ex-slaves from farms reached by the conflict.
- Filipe Camarão - Native from the Potiguar tribe, leader of the forces from that tribe.

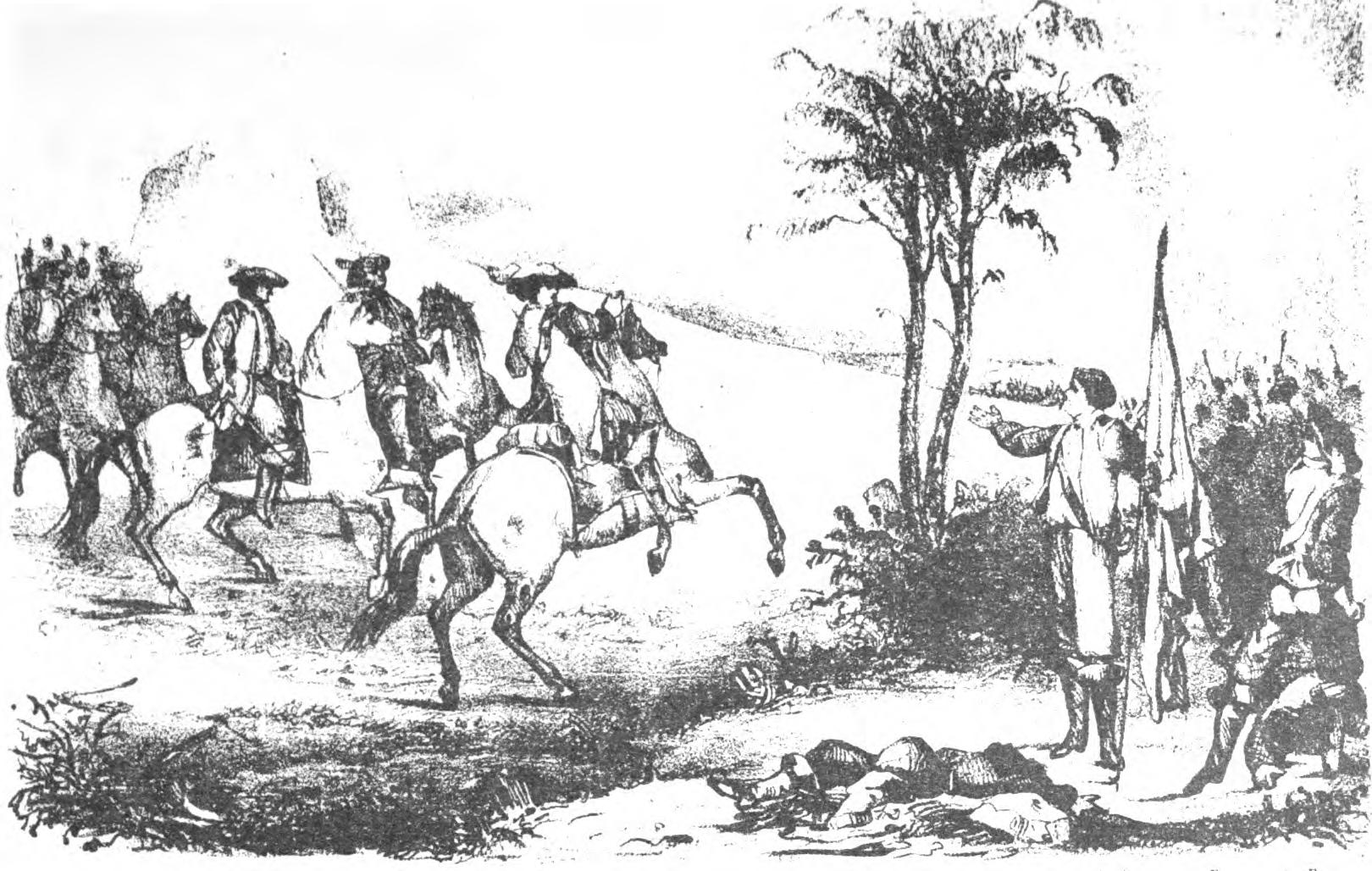
Battle of Guararapes.

- João Fernandes Vieira - Land owner from Funchal, Madeira, commanded one infantry terço.
- André Vidal de Negreiros - Commander of one infantry terço.

== See also ==
- First Battle of Guararapes
- Parque Histórico Nacional dos Guararapes
- Recapture of Recife (1652–1654)

== Notes ==
Media related to Battle of Guararapes at Wikimedia Commons
