= First Battle of Guararapes =

1648 battle

- Part of the Insurrection of Pernambuco
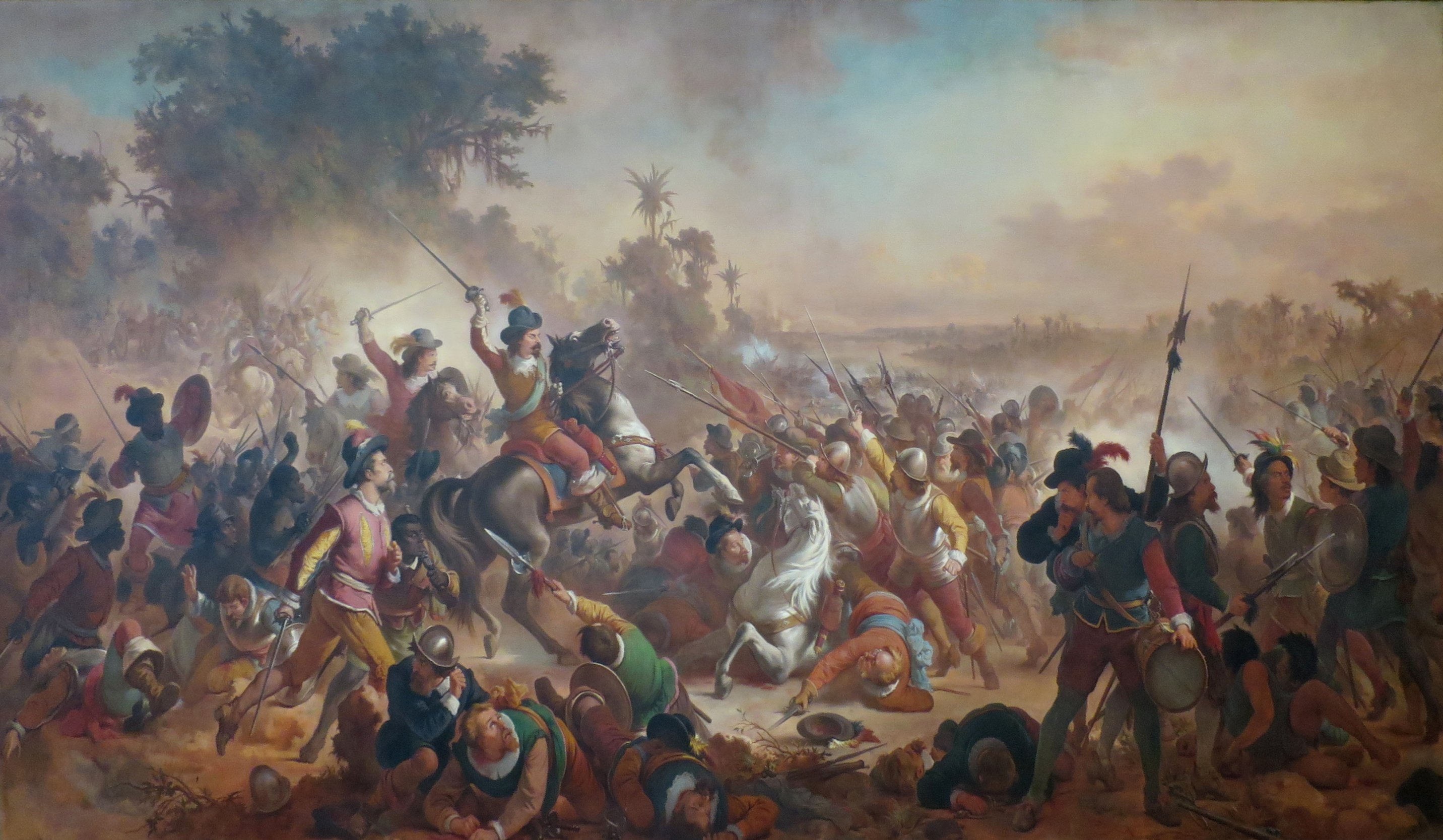
- Batalha dos Guararapes by Victor Meirelles, 1875–1879
Date	19 April 1648
Location	Morro dos Guararapes (present-day Jaboatão dos Guararapes, Pernambuco, Brazil)
Result	Portuguese victory

Belligerents
West India Company	Kingdom of Portugal; State of Brazil

Commanders and leaders
S. van Schoppe (WIA)	Francisco Barreto; Filipe Camarão; Fernandes Vieira; Henrique Dias; André Vidal de Negreiros

Strength
5,000; 5 cannons	2,200

Casualties and losses
1,000; 1 cannon captured	480: 80 killed 400 wounded

The First Battle of Guararapes took place during the Insurrection of Pernambuco, between Dutch and Portuguese forces in Pernambuco, in a dispute for the dominion of that part of the Portuguese colony of Brazil.

== Beginnings ==
On 18 April 1648, around forty five hundred Dutch soldiers and five artillery pieces marched south, coming from Recife. On their way south, they eliminated a small defensive outpost at the village of Barreta. The few survivors regrouped at the village of Arraial Novo do Bom Jesus, headquarters of the Portuguese resistance, where they reported the incident.

Commanders of the resistance called for a march of 2,000 combatants towards the Jaboatão dos Guararapes ("Drums" in native language) Hills against an enemy better equipped and in superior numbers.

== Forces involved in the conflict ==
=== Dutch Forces ===
Sigismund van Schoppe, the Dutch commander, experienced in Brazilian campaigns where he used to fight since he was a Captain, intended to proceed to the south, targeting initially the village of Muribeca - a key point to reach Santo Agostinho Cape. His plan was to isolate the resistance troops from reserves and supplies that might have come from the south, and then have them destroyed by his superior force.

=== Portuguese Forces ===
Francisco Barreto de Meneses, the Portuguese commander (Mestre-de-Campo-General), had recently arrived to that region and decided to follow his subordinate's suggestions: they would go to their enemy instead, and force the Dutch troops into a decisive encounter. This was a bold move, considering they had half the numbers of their adversaries, and no artillery. At this point, information sent from the fallen Barreta outpost had come to them, and they knew exactly the size and equipment available to the Dutch forces.

== Battle ==
At the beginning of the fight, von Schoppe may have realized that he would have to fight a much stronger force than the one he had defeated in Barreta. Also, the opportunity to choose the proper place to meet a superior force was crucial for the Portuguese victory. The terrain was damp, mostly swamp, and did not allow for the classical in-line formation of European armies. Forced into a narrow front, the Dutch's advantages had been almost nullified.

The Portuguese forces were divided into five terços commanded by Barreto de Meneses, Fernandes Vieira, Filipe Camarão, and Henrique Dias. André Vidal de Negreiros was the commander of the fifth terço kept in reserve.

Barreto de Meneses concentrated his efforts on the space between the East face and the main swamp. In the center, Fernandes Vieira's terço had the mission to penetrate as deep as possible into the enemy's formation. On the right flank, Filipe Camarão would use the long experience of the natives in fighting in the swamped terrain. Henrique Dias would use the "terço dos negros" (black's terço) to keep the Dutch from advancing and then avoiding the spear head advance from being flanked.

Limited by the lack of space for maneuver, von Schoppe concentrated most of his forces on the space between the east face and the main swamp. Three of his battalions were face-to-face against the terços of Vieira and Camarão, while two other battalions of his would try to flank the advancing forces and would be contained by the terço of Dias. Two Dutch battalions would not be allowed to maneuver and would stay back, out of action.

The closed space also did not allow the use of firearms to its full potential and maximized the use of native weapons and the short sword. Diogo Lopes Santiago, a possible eye witness of that event, gives his gruesome account of that encounter: "(...) and as they ran away, our soldiers would follow them with their swords with cuts and slashes, cutting legs, arms, heads, some killing, others wounding badly, laying on the field bodies without arms, trunks without heads (...) holding their sword in the middle of those squadrons, piles of enemies, giving spokes to some and to others death, showing the sword, tinted in blood".

== See also ==
- Second Battle of Guararapes
- Parque Histórico Nacional dos Guararapes
