= Henrique Dias =

Brazilian soldier (died 1662)

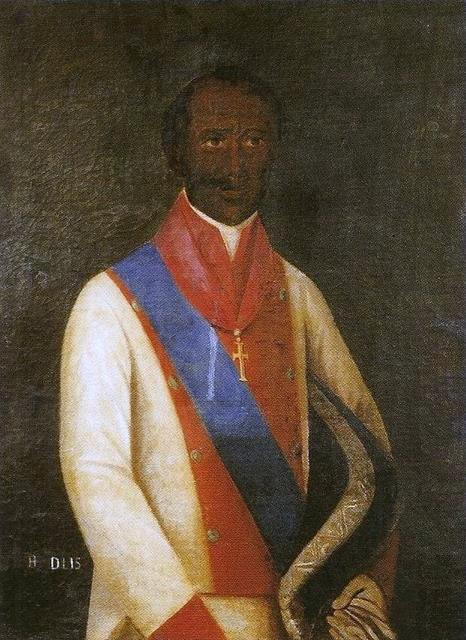
Portrait of Henrique Dias at the Museu do Estado de Pernambuco (Museum of the State of Pernambuco)

Henrique Dias (died 8 June 1662) was a Portuguese soldier and militia leader born in the colony of Brazil. There is no consensus among historians whether he was born free or captive.

== Military career ==
Dias led a military regiment composed of enslaved and freed slaves and was known as "Governor of the Blacks" in 1636. Dias defended Portuguese settlements from Dutch forces and played important roles in the First and Second Battles of Guararapes, in the defense of Salvador, Bahia, and to restore Portuguese control over Pernambuco. Dias' title was expanded to "Governor of All Creoles, Blacks, and Mulattoes," in 1639.

It is debated whether Dias received nobility status within Brazil, some believe Dias was granted Knighthood in The Order of Christ, while others contend that Dias never received this title and requested knighthood be granted to the men who marry his daughters. Dias traveled to Portugal and petitioned the crown to grant his requests. Dias requested the enslaved blacks who served with him be freed should have "all the rights and privileges of white units". Dias also requested to be compensated for his efforts and allowed to serve as long as he wished.

== See also ==
- Colonial Brazil
- Dutch Brazil
- Research Materials: Max Planck Society Archive
