= André Vidal de Negreiros =

Portuguese colonial governor and military man

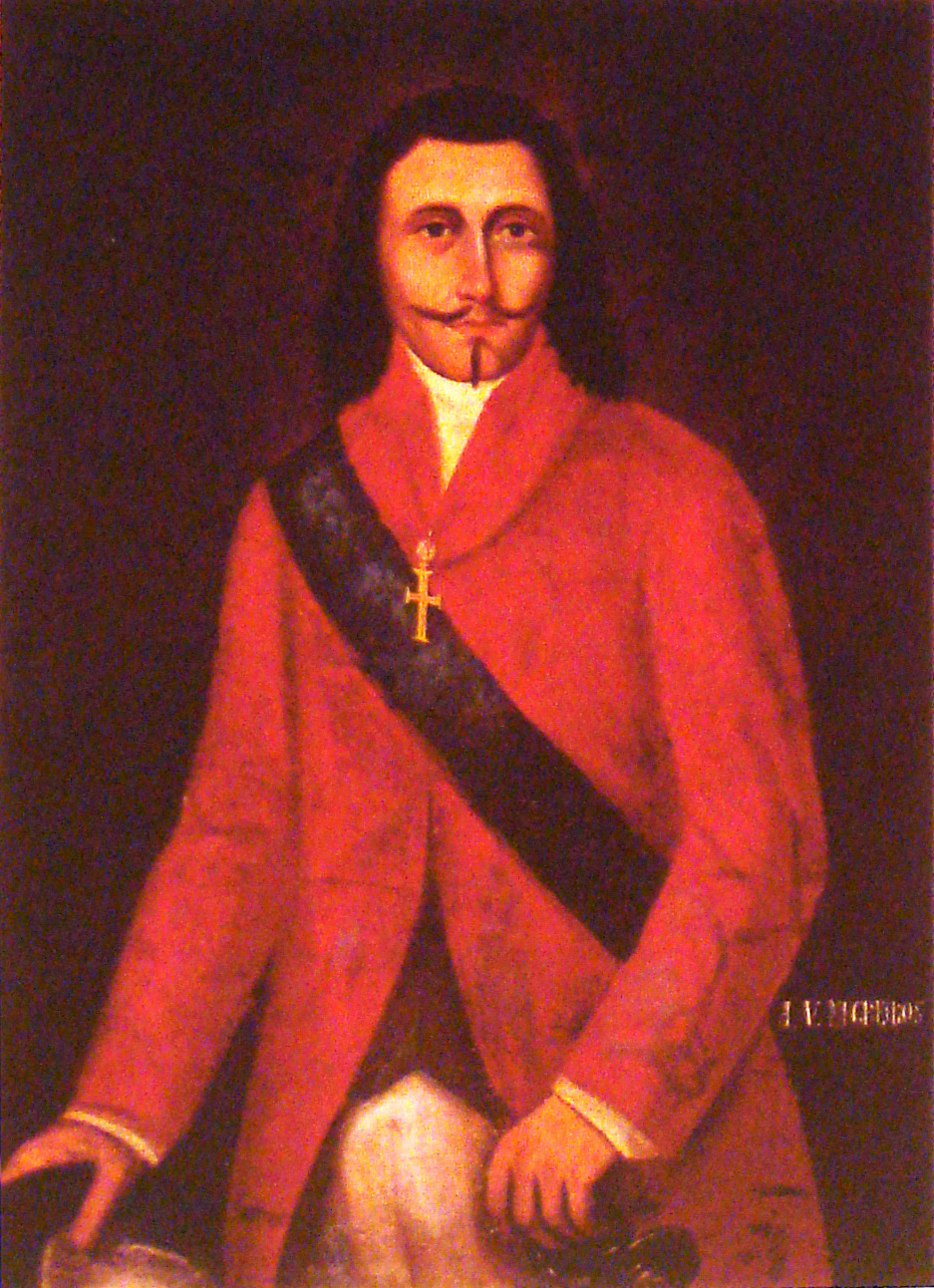

Governor of Maranhão and Grão-Pará
- In office 1655–1656

Governor of Pernambuco
- In office 1657–1661

Governor of Angola
- In office 1661–1666

Governor of Pernambuco
- In office 1667

Personal details
- Born: 1606
- Died: 3 February 1680 (aged 73–74)

André Vidal de Negreiros (1606 – 3 February 1680) was a Portuguese colonial governor and military man born in the then colony of Brazil, known mainly for being one of the leaders of the Insurrection of Pernambuco, also known as the War of Divine Light, against Dutch colonization in Brazil (1624–1654).

== Biography ==
André Vidal de Negreiros was the son of Francisco Vidal, born in Lisbon, and his wife, Catarina Ferreira, born in Porto Santo, Madeira. Born in the São João sugar cane mill (engenho), in the Capitania of Paraíba. He never married, but by testament he endowed his various illegitimate sons with considerable material inheritances.

In the context of the Dutch invasions of Brazil (1624–1654), André Vidal de Negreiros fought against the Dutch in Salvador, Bahia (1624). After eight years in Portugal and Spain, he returned to Brazil to fight the government of the Dutch prince Maurice of Nassau, installed in Pernambuco and neighboring captaincies, participating in all phases of the Pernambucan Insurrection (1645–1654), when he mobilized troops and means in northeastern Brazil.

He was named Field-Master, making himself known in command of one of the units of the Patriot Army infantry, in the two battles of Guararapes, in 1648 and 1649, along with João Fernandes Vieira, Henrique Dias and Filipe Camarão. He commanded the siege of Recife that resulted in the Dutch capitulation in the year 1654.

In charge of bringing King John IV (1640–1656), the news of the expulsion of the Dutch, was decorated by the sovereign with the Order of Christ and successively appointed Governor and Captain-General of the Captaincy of Maranhão and Grão-Pará (1655–1656). Later he was appointed governor of the captaincy of Pernambuco (1657–1661), of Angola (1661–1666) and, again, of Pernambuco (1667).

The historian Veríssimo Serrão, complements:

He led war operations until 1654, being, in Varnhagen's opinion, the great architect of the expulsion of the Dutch. The Crown later used it as governor of the Captaincies of Maranhão (1656–1666) and Pernambuco (1657–1661 and 1667 ), and also ruled the State of Angola (1661-1666). Although he considered him a valiant tug-of-war, Charles R. Boxer limits the role of Negreiros in the leadership of the movement, considering that it was João Fernandes Vieira main hero of the reconquest of Pernambuco.

Vidal de Negreiros died in Engenho Novo da Vila of Goiana, Pernambuco, in 1680, at the age of 74. In spite of its value as heroic leader of the Pernambucan Insurrection, it is worth remembering that the dispute for the Brazilian territory was inserted in the context of the Dutch-Portuguese War, that, in turn, was part of the picture of the Portuguese Restoration War. Therefore, the expulsion of the Dutch from Pernambuco in 1654 did not mean the closing of the question, which in fact would only be resolved after 1661 by diplomatic means by the signing of the Treaty of The Hague. Under the agreement, New Holland was "sold" to Portugal for four million reis (or eight million guilders), equivalent to about 4.5 tons of gold and the Peace, Alliance and Trade Treaty, signed in July 1669.

The famous philosopher, writer and Jesuit speaker Father António Vieira wrote about André Vidal de Negreiros in one of his letters to the then Portuguese king Dom João IV:

From André Vidal I will tell your Majesty what I have not dared to do so far, for not hurrying; and because I have known so many men, I know that it takes a long time to get to know a man. Your Majesty has very few in your kingdoms like André Vidal, I knew him little more than of sight and fame: he is as much for everything else as he is for a soldier, very Christian, very executive, a great friend of justice and reason, very zealous in the service of your Majesty and an observer of your royal orders, and above all very unconcerned, and who understands all matters well, even if he does not speak in verse, which is the fault assigned to him by a certain great minister of your majesty court. From what has helped this Christianity I have to him an obligation; but as far as your majesty is concerned (which I can not forget) I say to your majesty that André Vidal is lost in Maranhão, and that India would not be lost if your majesty gave it to him.

On 6 August 2012 Brazilian Federal Law No. 12,701 established the names of André Vidal de Negreiros, Francisco Barreto de Menezes, João Fernandes Vieira, Henrique Dias, Antônio Filipe Camarão and Antônio Dias Cardoso in the Book of Heroes of the Fatherland (known as O Livro de Aço, The Book of Steel), deposited in the Pantheon Pátria e Liberdade Tancredo Neves (Tancredo Neves Pantheon of Fatherland and Freedom), a cenotaph that honors the Brazilian national heroes located in the Praça dos Três Poderes (Three Powers Plaza), in Brasilia. There is a street with his name in the parish of Marvila, Lisbon. The Brazilian actress Alessandra Vidal de Negreiros Negrini (b. 1970) is his descendant on the maternal side.

== Gallery ==
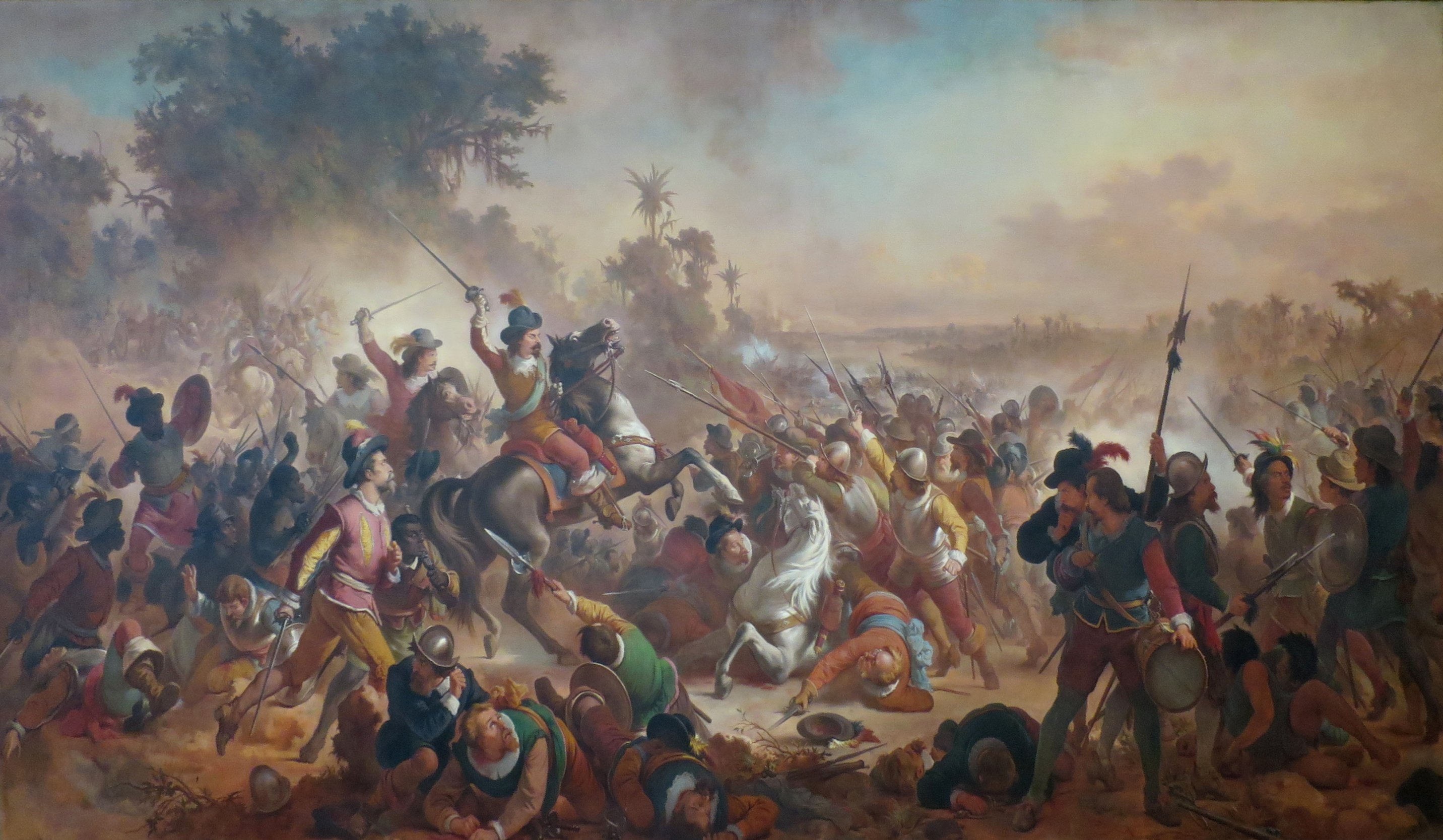
Victor Meirelles Batalha dos Guararapes painting, 1879.

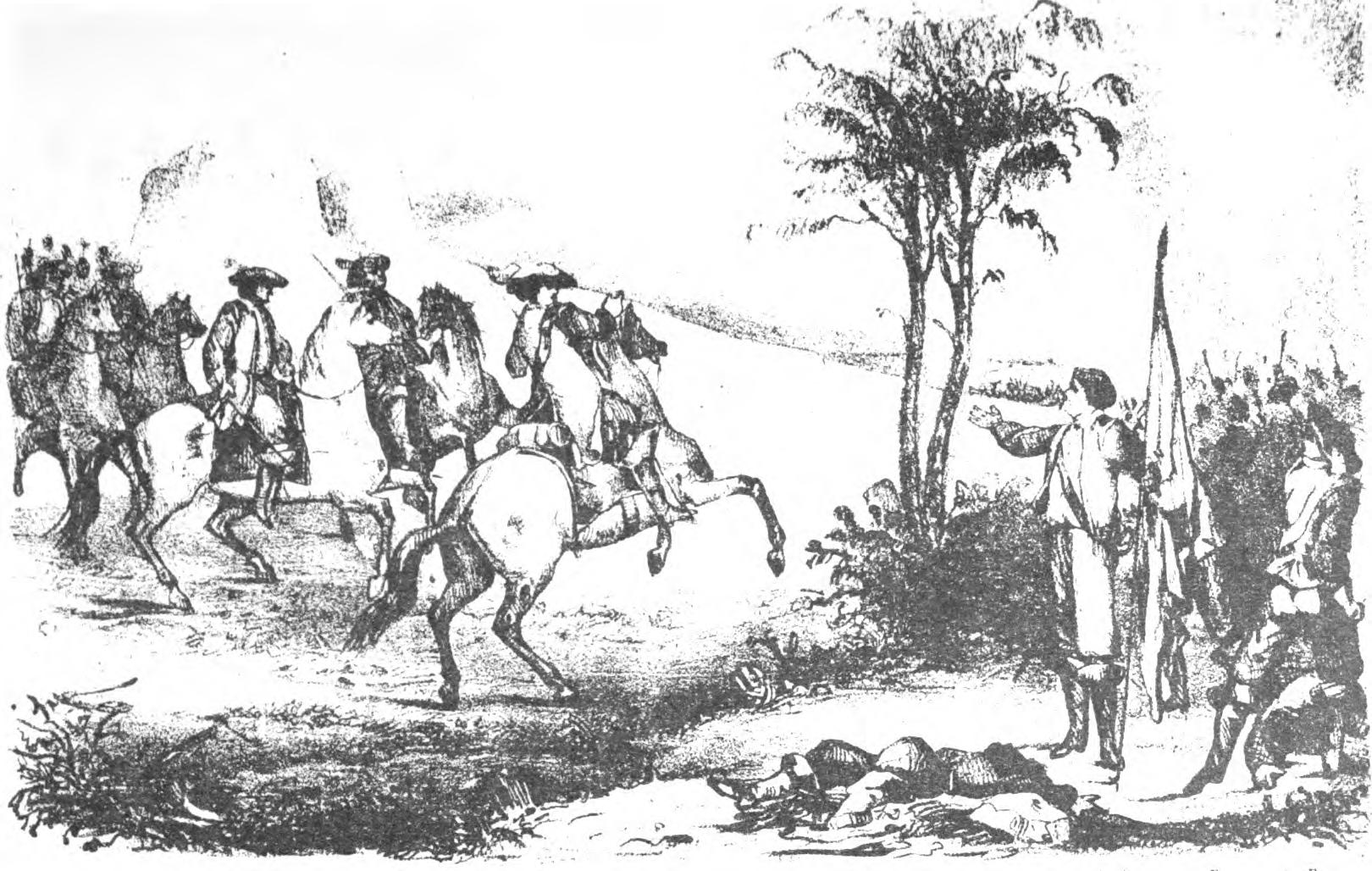
História da guerra entre o Brazil e a Hollanda, durante os annos de 1624 a 1654, terminada pela gloriosa restauração de Pernambuco e das capitanias confinantes, 1844

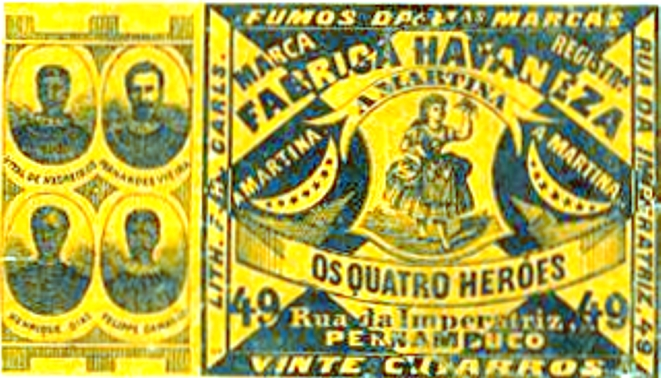
Cigarette box with tribute to the four heroes of the Pernambucan Insurrection.
