= Ganot (disambiguation) =

Ganot may refer to:

== Places ==
- Ganot, a moshav in Israel
- Ganot Hadar, a settlement in Israel

== People ==
- Adolphe Ganot (1804-1887), a French author and publisher
