= Pedro Américo =

Brazilian painter, author, philosopher and politician (1843–1905)

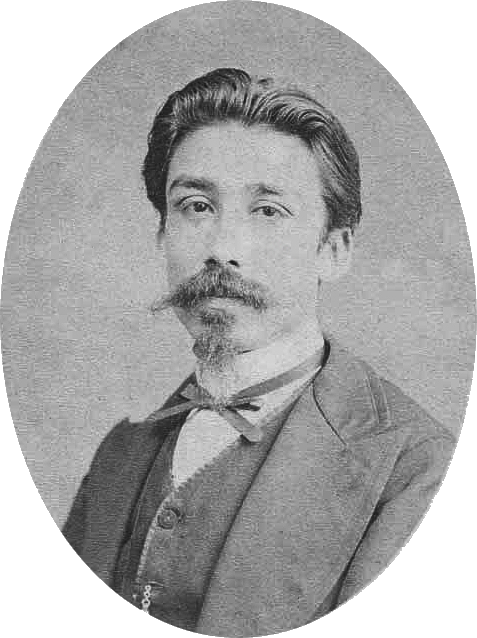
- Américo, c. 1871
- Born: Pedro Américo de Figueiredo e Melo; 29 April 1843; Areia, Paraíba, Empire of Brazil
- Died: 7 October 1905 (aged 62); Florence, Tuscany, Kingdom of Italy
- Known for: Painting

Signature
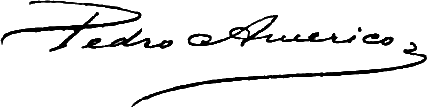

Pedro Américo de Figueiredo e Melo (29 April 1843 – 7 October 1905) was a Brazilian novelist, poet, scientist, art theorist, essayist, philosopher, politician and professor, best remembered as one of the most important academic painters in Brazil. He showed an inclination towards the arts from a young age, being considered a child prodigy. Before the age of ten, he participated as a draftsman on an expedition of naturalists through the Brazilian northeast, and received government support to study at the Imperial Academy of Fine Arts. He furthered his artistic studies in Paris, but he also dedicated himself to science and philosophy. Soon after his return to Brazil, he began to teach at the academy and began a successful career, gaining prominence with great paintings of a civic and heroic character, inserting himself in the civilizing and modernizing program of the country fostered by emperor Pedro II, of which the Imperial Academy was the regulatory and executive arm in the artistic sphere.

His style in painting, in line with the great trends of his time, fused neoclassical, romantic and realistic elements, and his production is one of the first great expressions of Academicism in Brazil in its heyday, leaving works that remain alive in the collective imagination of the nation to this day, such as Batalha de Avaí, Fala do Trono, Independência ou Morte! and Tiradentes Esquartejado, reproduced in school books across the country. In the second half of his career, he concentrated on oriental, allegorical and biblical themes, which he personally preferred and whose market was expanding, but this part of his work, popular at the time, quickly went out of fashion, and did not receive much attention from specialists in recent times remaining little known.

He spent his career between Brazil and Europe, receiving favors from critics and the public but also raising controversies and creating tenacious opponents. For the new avant-gardes of his time, Pedro Américo was a painter of gifts.

He acquired an intellectual sophistication quite unusual for Brazilian artists of his time, taking an interest in a wide variety of subjects and seeking solid preparation. He obtained a Bachelor of Arts in Social Sciences from the Sorbonne and a PhD in Natural Sciences from the Free University of Brussels. He was director of the antiquities and numismatics section of the Imperial and National Museum; professor of drawing, aesthetics and art history at the Imperial Academy, and constituent deputy for Pernambuco. He left a large written production on aesthetics, art history and philosophy, where, inspired by the classical model, he gave special attention to education as the basis of all progress and reserved a superior role for art in the evolution of humanity. He won several honors and decorations, including the title of Historical Painter of the Imperial Chamber, the Order of the Rose and the Order of the Holy Sepulchre. He also left some poetry and four novels, but like his theoretical texts, they are little remembered today.

== Biography ==
=== Early life ===
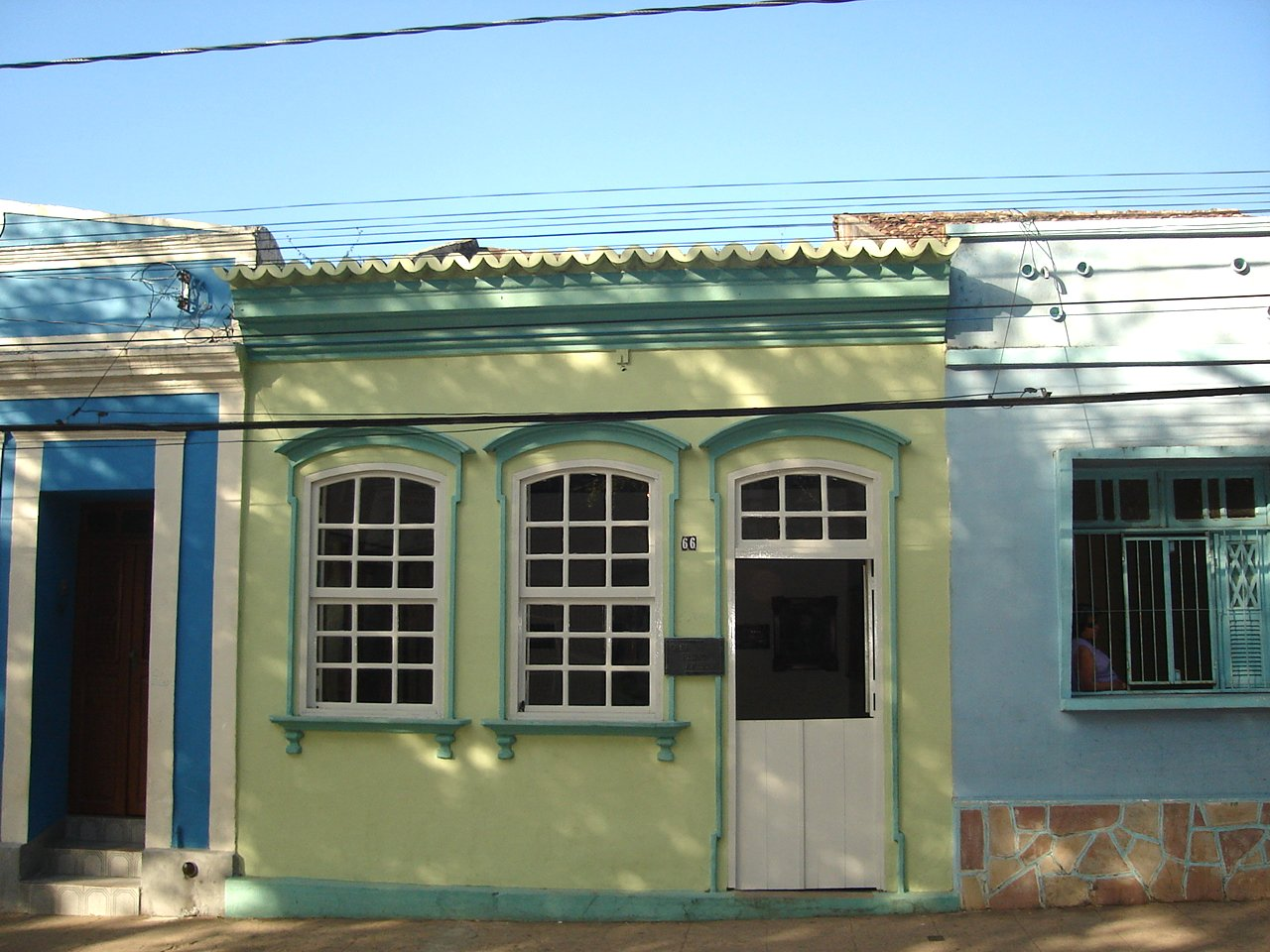
The house where Pedro Américo was born, today a museum in his memory

Pedro Américo was the son of the merchant Daniel Eduardo de Figueiredo and Feliciana Cirne; he was the brother of the also painter Francisco Aurélio de Figueiredo e Melo. His family was linked to the arts, although they did not have many resources, and from an early age he found at home the necessary stimulus for the development of an early talent. His father was a violinist and introduced him to music, as well as introducing him to drawing by giving him books on famous artists.

Pedro Américo drew very well and soon the fame of the little prodigy spread throughout the city. When a scientific expedition arrived there in 1852, its organizer, naturalist Louis Jacques Brunet, went to visit him and was able to appreciate a series of copies of classic works made by the boy, who was not yet ten years old. Wanting to test him to prove the skill that was claimed, Brunet got some objects and had Pedro Américo draw them in his presence; Américo was able to reproduce them with great resemblance. Impressed, Brunet decided to hire Américo as the expedition's draftsman, so the little artist accompanied the Frenchman on a twenty-month trip across much of northeastern Brazil. In 1854, at the age of eleven, provided with several letters of recommendation, Américo was admitted to the Imperial Academy of Fine Arts, in Rio de Janeiro, but could not join immediately. Before that he spent a season at Pedro II College studying Latin, French, Portuguese, arithmetic, drawing and music, standing out among his colleagues for his dedication and intelligence. His letters to his family reveal a student aware of his responsibilities, and he already had a desire, still uncertain, to dedicate himself to historical painting.

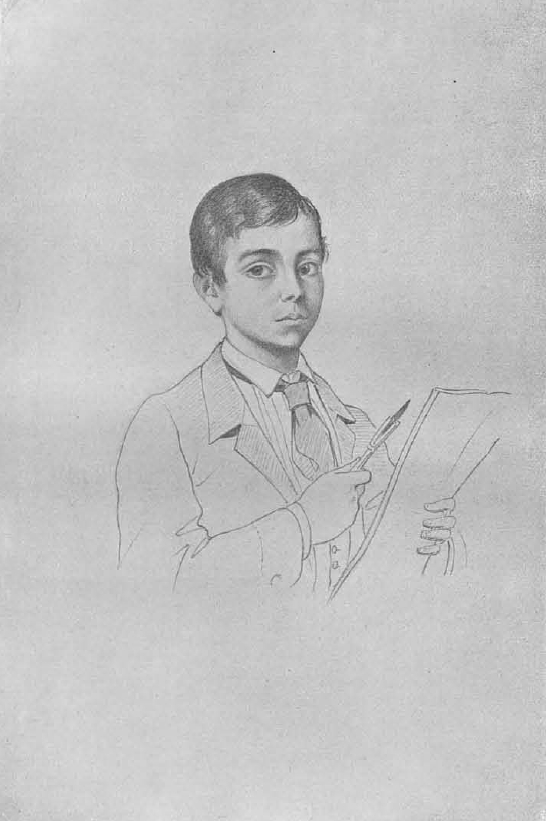
Self-portrait at age 11

Joining the academy's Industrial Design course in 1856, his progress was equally brilliant, winning 15 medals in drawing, geometry and live model, being nicknamed papa-medalhas (medal earner) by the director of the institution, artist and scholar Manuel de Araújo Porto-Alegre, who would be an important influence on him, and his future father-in-law. Even before finishing the course, Américo obtained a pension from emperor Pedro II to go and study in Europe. Shortly before boarding, he developed an illness diagnosed as "lead colic", supposedly an intoxication by the paints he used, and which would accompany him throughout his life.

After a painful and bumpy journey, he arrived in Paris in mid-May 1859, immediately scouring the city's museums, monuments, palaces and art galleries. At the same time, he enrolled at the École des Beaux-Arts, being a disciple of Ingres, Léon Cogniet, Hippolyte Flandrin and Sébastien-Melchior Cornu. According to his scholarship contract, he was required to strictly obey the discipline of the academy and regularly send works to Brazil to attest to his progress, including studies of living models and copies of works by renowned masters, including Guido Reni and Théodore Géricault. He won two first-class prizes, but was not interested in the great academic halls, which he considered unrepresentative.

As he had other cultural interests besides art, during his stay in Paris Américo also studied at the Institute of Physics of Adolphe Ganot and in the Archeology Course of Charles Ernest Beulé. Américo graduated in Social Sciences at the Sorbonne, delving into architecture, theology, literature and philosophy, and attended classes by Victor Cousin, Claude Bernard and Michael Faraday at the Collège de France and the Conservatory of Arts and Crafts. During this period, he wrote many essays on the relationship between art, science and social progress, a theme on which he would defend his thesis. In 1862 he went to Belgium, enrolling at the Free University of Brussels, but rarely attending classes. All these studies profoundly marked his character and thought, and he began to dedicate himself to classical studies and to be concerned with the artist's civil responsibility and his political commitment. There he began to organize his synthetic philosophy, where the arts were, for him, the true promoters of social progress, and should be cultivated on a humanist basis, mirroring the example of the classical Greeks and the Renaissance. At this time, he also visited the Salon des Refusés, in Paris, where they exhibited artists who remained outside the official circuit, which was important in bringing him into contact with the pre-modernist avant-gardes.

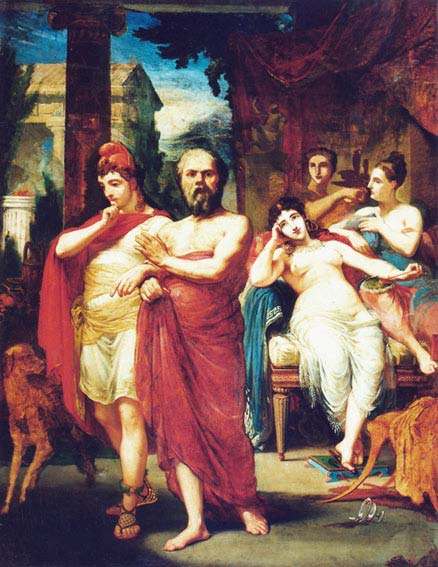
Sócrates afastando Alcebíades dos braços do vício, 1861

At a certain point, he ended up in financial difficulties, but managed to supplement his academic pension with help from the Provincial Assembly of Paraíba in 1863. In 1864, visiting Scotland by boat, he was saved from a shipwreck. In the same year he returned to Brazil, recalled back by the emperor to participate in a competition for professor of Figurative Drawing in the Industrial Design course at the Imperial Academy. He won it with the work Sócrates afastando Alcebíades dos braços do vício, but did not assume the chair. Américo visited his hometown, which he would recreate in his novels, where he found a brother who was born in the year of his departure and worried about the poverty of his relatives. Back in Rio de Janeiro, he published a pioneering series of essays on aesthetics and art history in the journal Correio Mercantil, but soon after, asking for leave without pay, he returned to Europe.

In 1865 he wandered, largely on foot, through several countries. He began his journey from Paris to Strasbourg, then to the Grand Duchy of Baden, the Netherlands and Denmark. He then continued through Morocco, Sicily, the Greek islands, and Algeria, which was something of a Mecca for many painters of his generation who were interested in exotic settings. There he worked as a draftsman for the French government, making records of human types, landscapes and animals in the region. The publication, in French, of his first novel, Holocausto, which was only translated to Portuguese in 1882, dates from this time. His finances were tight again, he went hungry and had to make drawings and portraits in cafes to survive. Receiving a gold medal at the Imperial Academy for the painting A Carioca, a nude refused by emperor Pedro, to whom it had been offered. Americo asked a friend in Rio de Janeiro to sell the prize, with whose money he could support himself for a while longer.

In 1868, he defended the thesis Science and Systems: Questions of Natural History and Philosophy at the Faculty of Sciences of the University of Brussels, obtaining the degree of Doctor of Natural Sciences, approved with merit and appointed in January of the following year as an adjunct professor. The approval was reported in several Brazilian and Belgian newspapers in extremely laudatory terms, assuming the character of a scientific event, and according to his first biographer, he was awarded the Order of the Holy Sepulcher, granted by Pope Pius IX. The paintings São Marcos, Visão de São Paulo and Cabeça de São Jerônimo date from this period. At the same time, the Brazilian government pressured him to return and take up his professorship at the Imperial Academy.

=== Return to Brazil and fame ===
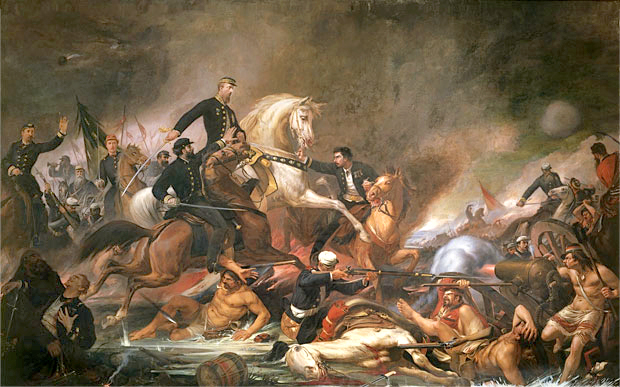
Batalha de Campo Grande, 1871, depicting the Battle of Acosta Ñu

Relenting to the government's requests, Américo returned to Brazil in 1869, first passing through Portugal, where at the end of the year he married Carlota de Araújo Porto-Alegre (1844–1918), daughter of Manuel de Araújo Porto-Alegre, then Brazilian consul in Lisbon. With her he would later have three children. He arrived in Rio de Janeiro in the early 1870s and began to dedicate himself to painting mythological and historical canvases and portraits. At the Imperial Academy he taught archeology, art history and aesthetics. He also wrote, directed the numismatics and archeology sections of the Imperial and National Museum, and made caricatures for the periodical A Comédia Social.

But when he returned from Europe, he was still an unknown painter to Brazilians. A teaching career did not offer many prospects for fame and fortune, the Brazilian art market was still incipient, and it appears that he had a difficult, proud and self-sufficient personality, which earned him several disaffections. However, taking advantage of the wave of patriotism unleashed by the Brazilian victory in the Paraguayan War, and encouraged by the emperor, he painted the canvas Batalha do Campo Grande, a large-scale composition in which he sought to praise the monarchy and the main hero in the battle, the Count of Eu. Gaining the support of the press, he organized an intense promotional campaign for his work. Between August and September 1871, almost not a day passed without newspapers from Rio de Janeiro talking about the artist or the canvas, which was visited by more than 60,000 people.

At the same time, Luís Guimarães Júnior published a short, highly romanticized biography of the artist, which gained wide circulation and increased Americo's popularity. As a result, by the end of the year he had become a famous painter throughout the country, receiving commissions and distinctions, such as the Imperial Order of the Rose in the degree of officer (later promoted to Grand Dignitary and Commander) and the title of Historical Painter of the Imperial Chamber, but also becoming the center of great controversy.

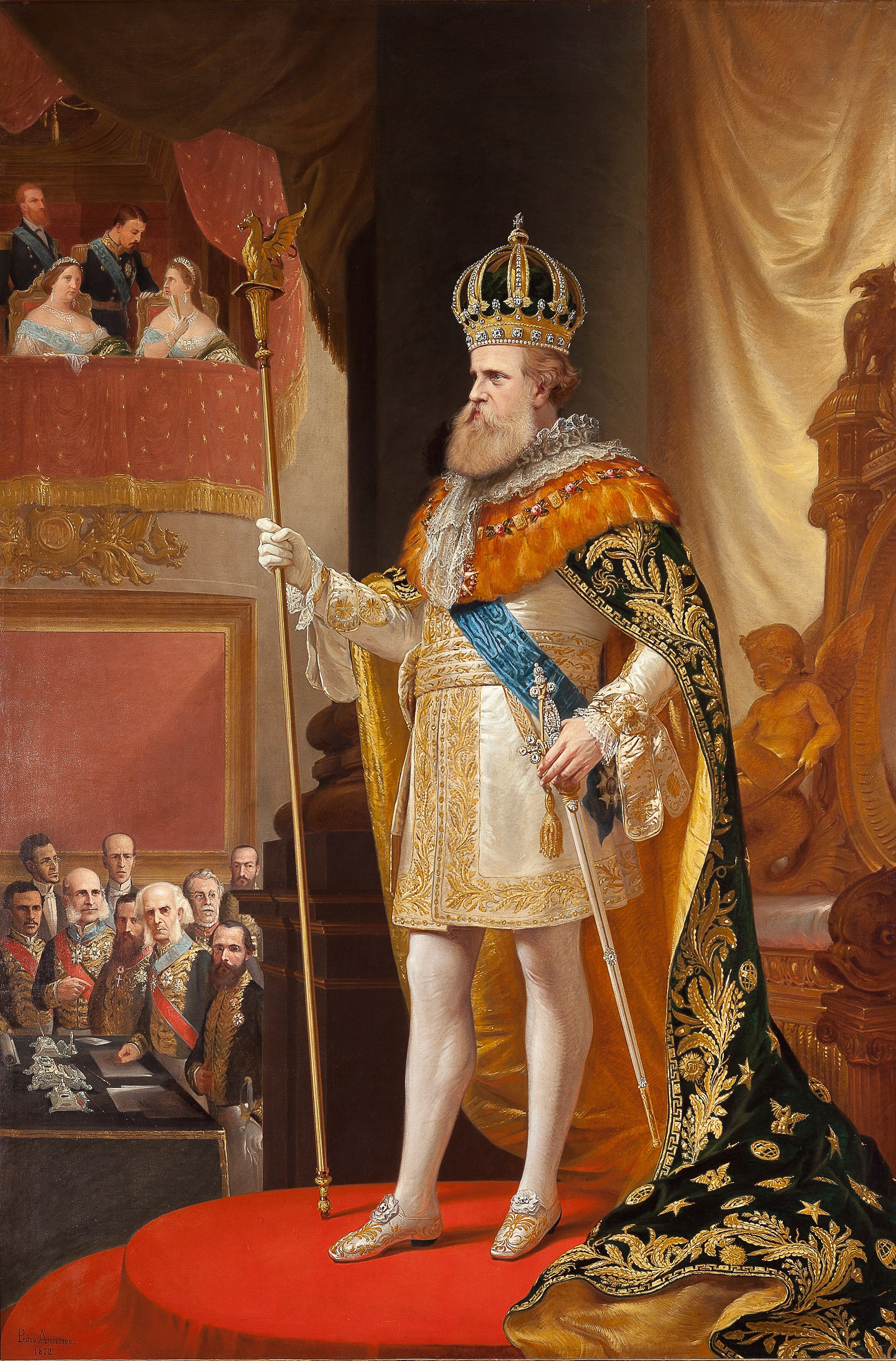
Fala do Trono, 1873. Emperor Pedro II's speech at the opening of the General Assembly

In this period and in the same spirit Américo also produced Fala do Trono, Ataque à Ilha do Carvoeiro, Passo da Pátria, Passagem do Chaco, and began the sketches for the government's of what was one of his greatest masterpieces, the large Batalha de Avaí, which was painted in Florence beginning in 1874 and being finished only in 1877. When first exhibited in Florence, still incomplete, it caused a sensation among art connoisseurs who had gathered in large numbers in the city for the celebrations of the fourth centenary of Michelangelo's birth. The work and a speech Américo delivered in two languages before the Renaissance master's statue of David, spread his fame throughout Europe, being celebrated in a number of articles and news as one of the greatest painters of his time. The Italian government, echoing the widespread praise, asked Américo for a portrait to appear with the luminaries of art of all times in the portrait gallery of the Uffizi, being exhibited among those of Ingres and Flandrin, Américo's own masters. When it was exhibited in Brazil, at the Imperial Academy General Exhibition of 1879, alongside the Batalha de Guararapes by Victor Meirelles, it aroused an even greater controversy than the previous battle. But the arguments were similar: the critics mainly attacked an alleged excess of fantasy and romanticism, as well as little historical accuracy in the representation of the scene. Américo, however, argued that: "A historical picture must, as a synthesis, be based on truth and reproduce the essential faces of the fact, and, as an analysis, [be based on] a great number of reasonings derived, at the same time from the consideration of credible and probable circumstances, and from a knowledge of the laws and conventions of art".

Surprisingly, art critic Gonzaga Duque himself, the most influential opponent of the academics, despite heavily criticizing the work, found in it elements to say that Américo had finally managed to break free from the orthodoxy of academicism and create a new and personal language of great vigor. At the same time, Américo was accused of plagiarizing the composition Battle of Montebelo by Italian painter Andrea Appiani, and another controversy tried to decide which of the two battles, Americo's Batalha de Avaí or Meirelles's Batalha de Guararapes, was the best one. The case was epoch-making in Brazil and became known as the Artistic Question of 1879.

After the resounding repercussion of Batalha de Avaí, Américo tried to convince the government to support him in the painting of Batalha de 24 de Maio, depicting the Battle of Tuyutí, but even after offering the work for free the project did not bear fruit. Disenchanted, Américo resigned from the academy, which was denied. At any rate, taking advantage of the Emperor's esteem for him, he obtained a leave of absence and set out again. At the beginning of the 1880s, already in Europe, he still tried to return to the theme of battles, designing a Battle of San Marino, to be acquired by the Italian government, but he did not go beyond the preparatory sketches.

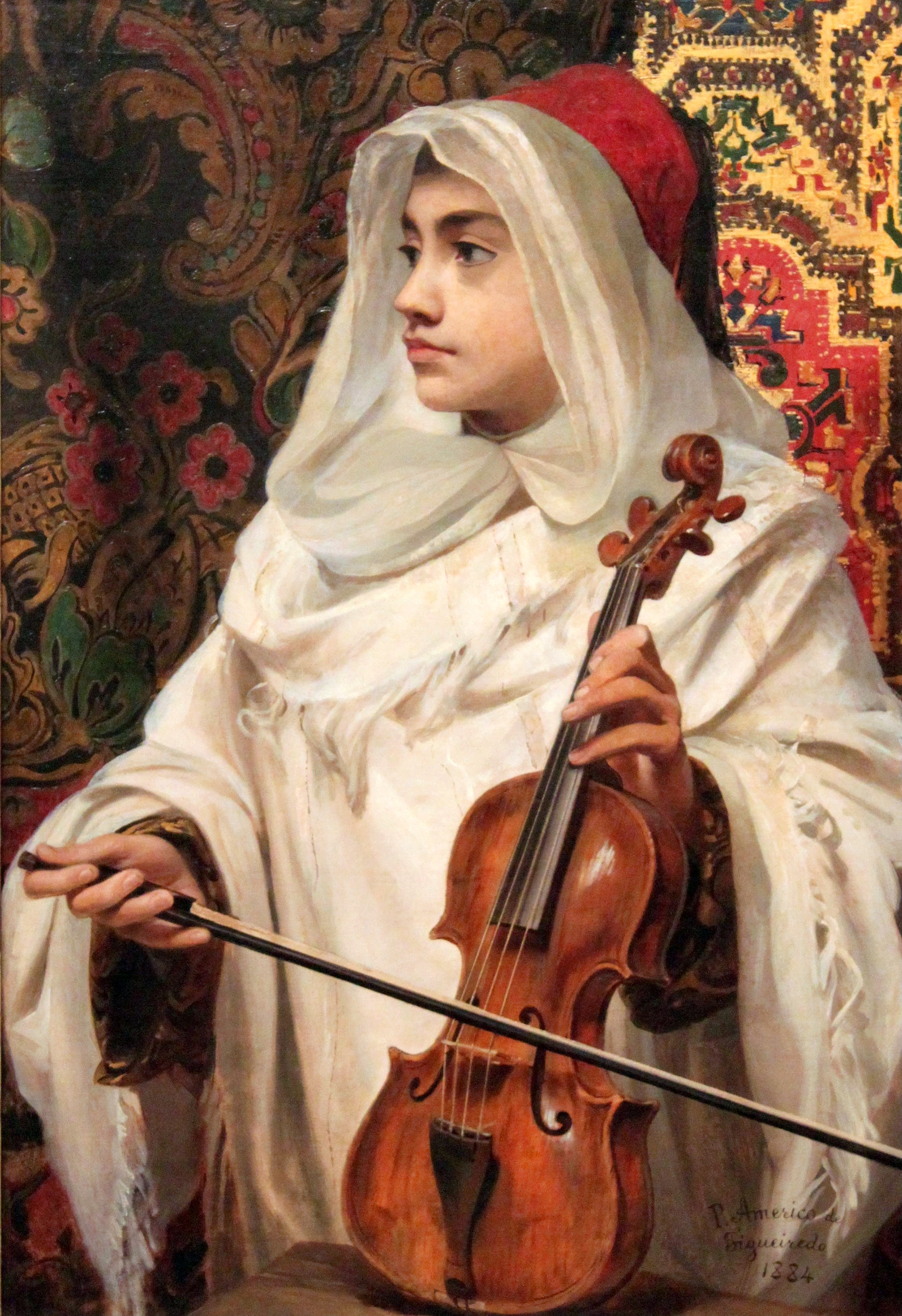
A rabequista árabe, 1884

Américo spent the following years mainly in Florence, abandoning civic matters that had a market only in the government itself and dedicating himself to works of a late and sentimental Romanticism, in allegories and scenes of oriental, historical or biblical themes, types that he personally preferred and that had greater penetration among the public, among them A Noite acompanhada dos gênios do Estudo e do Amor, Joana d'Arc ouve pela primeira vez a voz que lhe prediz o seu alto destino, A rabequista árabe, Os filhos de Eduardo IV and Dona Catarina de Ataíde e Jocabed levando Moisés até o Nilo. Several of these works participated in the academy's halls or were exhibited in Florence, and many were acquired by the Brazilian government.

In 1885 Américo briefly visited France and returned to Brazil to take up the chair of art history, aesthetics and archeology at the Imperial Academy, to which the emperor was assiduously present, and in the following year he published another novel, Amor de Esposo. Orders in Rio de Janeiro were scarce, however, and his health was no longer good; after losing a son, he saw his two others fall ill. However, Américo managed to sign a contract with the government of São Paulo for the creation in three years of another important work, Independência ou Morte!, painted in Florence in 1888, which immediately became famous and also controversial. Once again, his aesthetics were the subject of debate and he was accused of plagiarism.

In 1889 he participated in the Exposition Universelle, where he exhibited only a photograph and preparatory sketches for Independência ou Morte!, but which earned him praise from Ernest Meissonier and admission to the Académie des Beaux-Arts. At the invitation of the French government, he participated in a commission of the Regulatory Congress of Literary and Artistic Property, and represented Brazil in the Congress for the Protection of Historic Monuments, whose presidency he assumed in several sessions, in the absence of the titular president, the architect Charles Garnier.

=== Last years ===
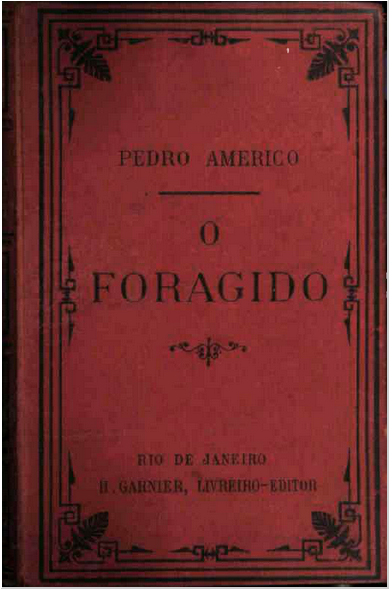
Cover of the novel O Foragido, 1899

After the Republic was proclaimed in Brazil on 15 November 1889, a change that led to the ostracism of another great academic painter of his generation, Victor Meirelles, Pedro Américo, back in Brazil, managed to maintain part of his prestige with the government, although he was also fired from the Imperial Academy as his colleague. The academy was restructured as the National School of Fine Arts. Américo produced more important works for the new regime: Tiradentes esquartejado (part of a projected series on the Minas Gerais Conspiracy that he did not perform), Libertação dos escravos and Honra e Pátria e Paz e Concórdia. In 1890 he was elected deputy for Pernambuco at the Constituent Congress and during his term he defended the creation of museums, galleries and universities throughout the country, but his already fragile health prevented him from attending the sessions assiduously.

Over the course of his career Américo amassed considerable wealth by investing in government bonds, but with the financial crisis triggered by the Encilhamento policy, his investments suddenly went down in value and he was ruined. In 1894, impoverished, his health deteriorating and his eyesight impaired, he moved permanently to Florence. Despite his problems, he still painted and wrote, publishing the novels O Foragido in 1899, and Na Cidade Eterna in 1901.

Américo died in Florence on 7 October 1905, victim of "lead colic", a supposed intoxication by the paints he used. By order of the President of Brazil, Rodrigues Alves, and under the care of the Baron of Rio Branco, his body was embalmed and transferred to Rio de Janeiro, where it was exposed for a few days at the War Arsenal. He was then sent to João Pessoa, the capital of Paraíba, where he received solemn obsequies between official mourning, the city's shops were closed and a crowd of admirers. On 29 April 1906, he was provisionally deposited in the São João Batista Cemetery, until the finishing of the mausoleum that the Historical and Geographical Institute of Brazil had ordered to be built it in Areia, Américo's hometown. The final burial in his hometown took place on 9 May 1906, also surrounded by great tributes. The house where he was born is now a museum dedicated to his memory, the Casa Museu Pedro Américo.

== Paintings ==
=== Context and academicism ===
In Américo's generation, the Empire of Brazil was internally entering a phase of reasonable stability, it asserted itself as the greatest South American power and its economy and culture were diversifying and expanding. There were many problems, certainly, but they were sought to be overcome in an atmosphere of liberalism and scientism, in which the influence of the Church declined and the secular sectors of society were strengthened. It was in the interest of the nation, as well as the current monarchy, for the country to favorably insert itself into a world economy undergoing rapid transformation and which was structured on a capitalist model. To achieve this goal, emperor Pedro II, a lover of the arts and sciences who in 1856 had written that the two great works he needed to accomplish were "to morally organize the nationality and form an elite", promoted a nationalist program of internal modernization and dissemination of Brazil abroad. Knowing the power of art as a formulator and consecration of symbols and values, within his program Pedro II reserved a special role for it, in charge of visually articulating the ideas of the new Empire. Activities focused on the Imperial Academy of Fine Arts, founded in 1816 and for many years in precarious operation, but since the 1850s it had been restructured and energized by a more consistent and enlightened state sponsorship and by the work of scholars such as Manuel de Araújo Porto-Alegre. Pedro Américo flourished during the height of Academicism in Brazil. However, despite significant advances in the art system, patronage conditions at the time were unpredictable and the lack of official funding was a chronic problem. As for the private market, it was just beginning to take shape.

Academicism systematized a repertoire of visual formulas possessing specific meanings, prescribing rules for their use, as if dictionarizing the history of visuality and organizing it in a peculiar grammar and semantics. More than that, it established a method of teaching art based on hierarchies of values largely derived from the philosophical and educational tradition of Classical Antiquity, with all its list of idealistic moral and civic virtues and all its rhetoric, manifested in art through beauty, harmony and a public utility. Functioning in close dependence on the States and elites, and having an idealistic philosophical basis, the European Academies naturally tended to be conservative, a characteristic that the Brazilian version shared with their European counterparts on whose imitation it was founded, but they were also agents of important artistic advances and on many occasions they were even avant-garde.

=== Style and technique ===
Américo possessed a sophisticated technique, paid great attention to detail and was quick to work. He was always an academic, but a versatile and eclectic one in the most influential and most contradictory phase of international academicism, which defined itself as a complex mixture of classical, romantic and realist references. Américo's work expressed idealistic aspirations typical of classicism, reflected in his "didactic" historical paintings and moralizing allegories, in his sense of hierarchical composition, and even in his humanist writings; his detailed characterization of figures and objects sometimes approaches realism, but his stylistic expression is mostly romantic, which was not really a contradiction, since romanticism was by itself an eclectic and idealistic current and very much indebted to the classics. But Brazilian Romanticism in painting, where Pedro Américo is included, was that of the third romantic generation, when the movement had already lost its original, passionate and revolutionary character, transforming itself into a softer and more conformist, more aesthetic and sentimental current, which quickly became bourgeois and in many ways genuinely "popular".

Among the artists who were possibly an influence on Américo's most important works are Horace Vernet, Antoine-Jean Gros, Eugène Delacroix, Théodore Géricault and François Gérard, as well as the Italian painters of the Risorgimento, such as Luigi Bechi. Some critics also find in him Baroque influences from Borgognone and Bernini.

=== Historical paintings ===
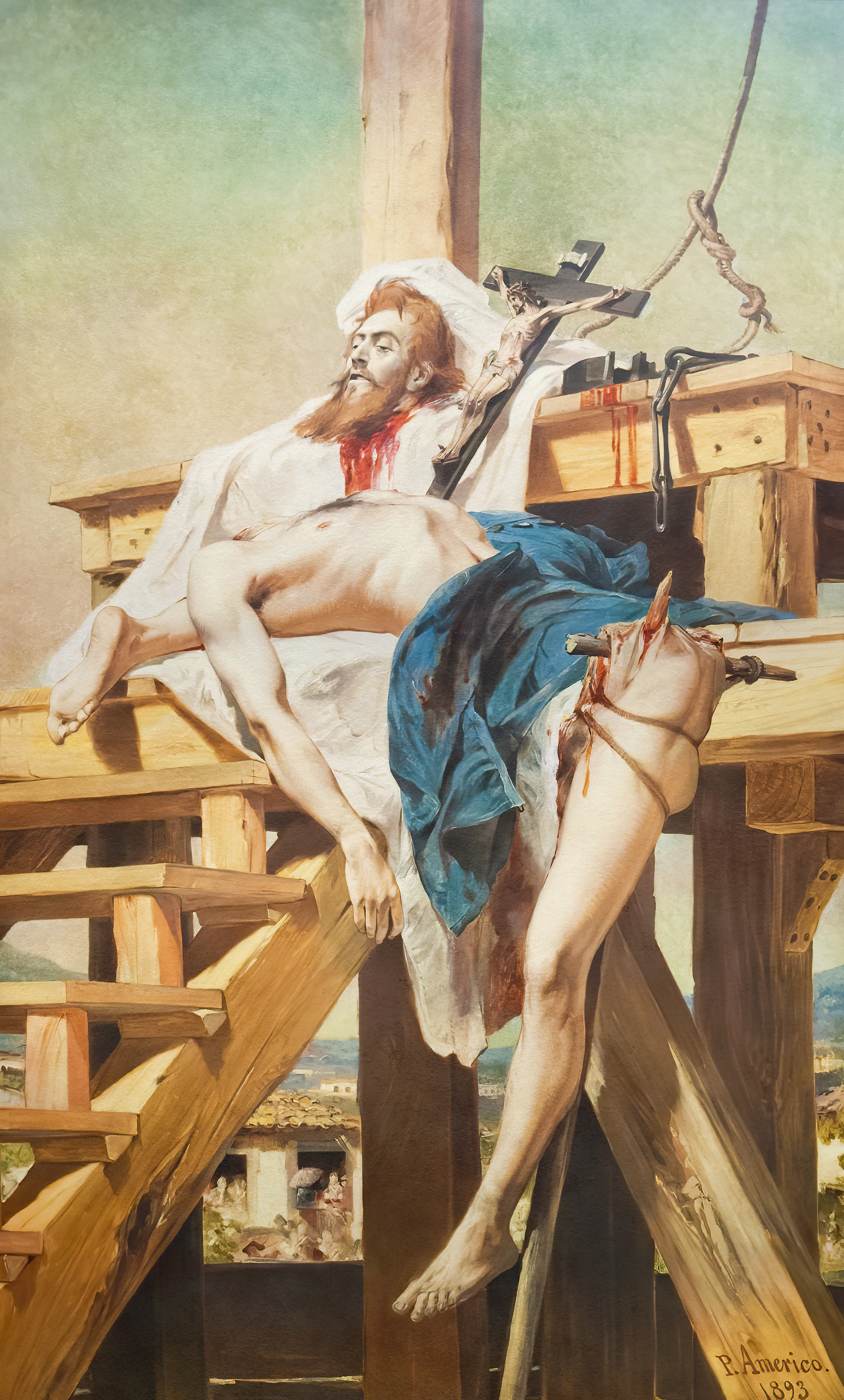
Quartered Tiradentes, 1893, Mariano Procópio Museum

"History painting" did not just mean the representation of historical events, but it was the recreation of facts especially significant to a community or nation. It developed a symbolic visual rhetoric and had a moralizing didactic function. It was the most prestigious genre in the academic system, being the one that demanded the most from the artist in terms of creativity, general cultural knowledge and technical skill, it was also the one that could most easily convey an ethical message and the one that could most perfectly illustrate the discourse of the elites, consecrating its values, addressing itself above all to the general public. To achieve its goals, history painting could work with religious themes, properly historical, or absorb mythical figures from the classical past to allegorically lend greater brightness to current events, or to evoke exemplary virtues.

History painting is defined by its subject and purpose, not its style. The genre has an immemorial origin, but it was consolidated in the Baroque period, when European absolutism was developing. In this system power is centralized, and all means are used to guarantee the sovereign's total independence and supremacy and assert his glory. From the Baroque onwards, the historical genre entered its golden phase, when the potential of its visual rhetoric was perceived and explored in depth by elites and governments, and, indifferent to the change in styles over the successive centuries, continued to serve the same purposes, always more linked to the civil sphere of society, although it could often incorporate religious elements in a period when Religion and the State lived in close proximity and the doctrine of the divine right of kings was articulated. The iconography produced, exalting the State and its King or representatives, its deeds and military conquests, often showing them blessed by God or by his angels and saints, or surrounded by classical divinities or personifications of virtues, justified, through an art that should amaze, seduce and above all convince and indoctrinate both subjects and foreigners, the maintenance of a system that was capable of such impressive feats in politics as in the arts, which acted in mutual favor. When neoclassicism arrived, the model was simply revisited once more.

The genre did not take root in Baroque Brazil because there was no court that sponsored it or academies that taught it; the territory was a Portuguese colony and its painting, almost entirely based on religious worship, was made in a corporative and semi-artisanal system. When Joachim Lebreton, the leader of the French Artistic Mission, defined the structure of the first academy in Brazil in a memorandum to king John VI in 1816, historical painting was already "provided for" in the curriculum, since Lebreton, himself an academic, merely traced his project based on the structure of the academy in Paris, reputed to be the most advanced of all that existed at the time throughout the West.

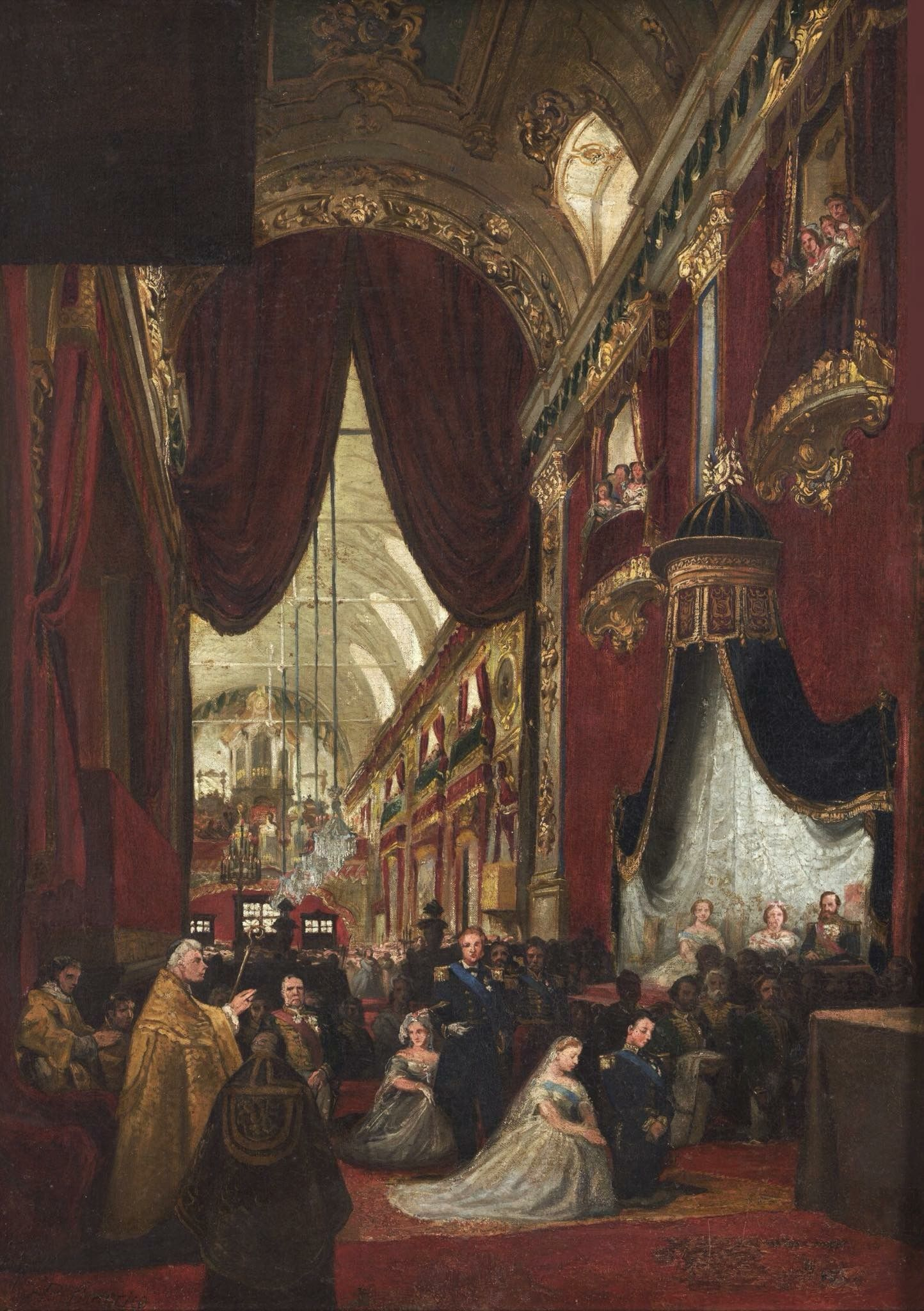
Study for the Marriage of Princess Isabel, 1864, Imperial Museum

However, as its tropical version took a long time to work and Brazil, an independent Empire since 1822, was in perennial upheaval and could not present anything too grandiose to be proud of in the face of a disaffected population still indifferent to the academic arts, the genre did not immediately prosper. The examples left by the French Mission painters, Jean-Baptiste Debret and Nicolas-Antoine Taunay, were rare, very modest in scale and did not always portray Brazilian events. Nationalism had not yet been added to the mix, the political usefulness of the academy at this point was not yet understood, there was little funding for it, and it was not even an official priority to maintain it. This unfavorable scenario was the simple expression of a frontal clash between two opposing realities: a Brazil still baroque, religious and semi-savage, and a neoclassical, secularized and sophisticated France.

The French knew the difference, and made a point of pointing out their "superiority", but to make matters worse, these French painters were former bonapartists, supporters of the one responsible for the invasion of Portugal and the escape of the Portuguese family to Brazil. Thus, on the one hand, they were a threat to Baroque artists and, on the other hand, they were viewed with suspicion by English diplomats, who exercised great influence on official decisions. The government, for its part, had many other problems to solve. Once Brazilian independence was proclaimed, Pedro I soon abdicated the throne and the country was headed by a regency, entering a tumultuous period. Adding to the adverse factors, it took decades before the Brazilian Academy could function on a regular basis and take root in its aesthetic and ideological principles.

Meanwhile, the styles changed once again, Brazil absorbed other European influences and romanticism began to predominate. If the immediate antecedents of Brazilian historical painting were in neoclassicism, impersonal, rational and universal, romanticism, especially in its second and third generation, emphasized the note of the particular, the note of the self, the minority, the nation or of the clan in relation to the large group, seeking to integrate it with classical universalism, while preserving a sense of identity differentiation, internal cohesion and autonomy.

When the Empire of Brazil stabilized, from the maturity of Pedro II, national forces in Brazil were engaged under a defined nationalist program. With an Imperial Academy in stable operation, historical painting began to flourish, with Victor Meirelles and Pedro Américo as its pioneers and two of its main representatives, manifesting itself on a monumental scale. Even in Europe, the painting Batalha do Avaí was seen as an innovative contribution to an ancient and venerable genre, but already in decline, and which in Brazil had such an ephemeral life, soon discredited by the modernists.

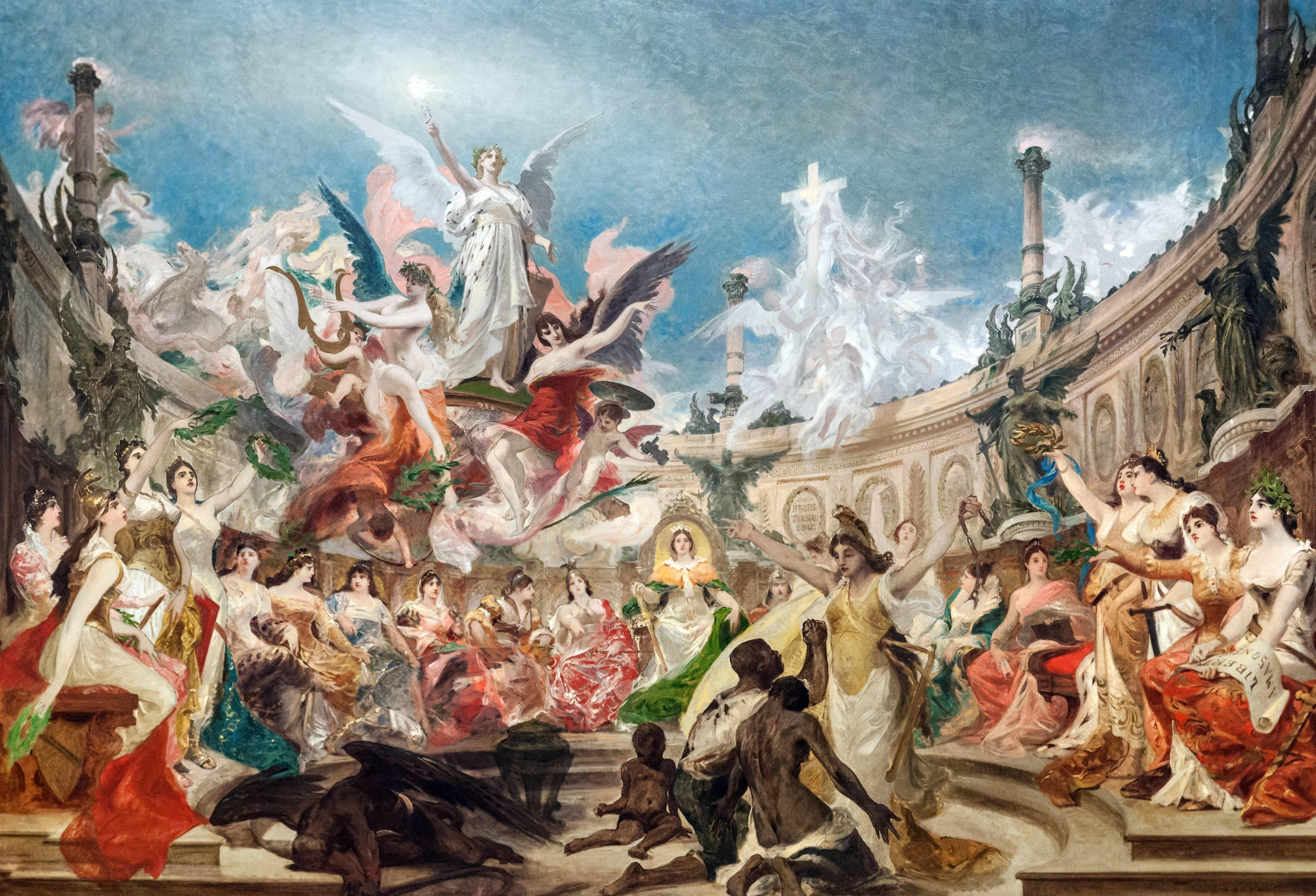
Libertação dos Escravos, 1889, Bandeirantes Palace

Pedro Américo acquires his greatest importance as a historical painter when he met a fundamental demand from the government: the reconstitution of ceremonies or historical events that signaled institutional autonomy, ensured the possession of the territory, affirmed Brazil as a military power in South America or exalted the virtues of the people and their leaders. With that, the elements were gathered for the construction of a nationalist iconography that would legitimize this recent country in the face of international powers and that still lacked its own symbology. In the first and most prominent phase of his career, the imperial one, Américo left historical works since his youth, such as Sócrates afastando Alcebíades dos braços do vício and some copies of works by other European authors, but his talent was consecrated with Batalha de Campo Grande, Fala do Trono, Batalha do Avaí and Independência ou Morte!, which fully met the needs of the state, of which Pedro Américo was undoubtedly one of the great interpreters. This interpretive capacity assured him a unique success among the sponsoring elites even after the republic was proclaimed in Brazil, when the appropriation of academic art by politics remained essentially the same as before, as evident by the paintings Libertação dos Escravos, Tiradentes Esquartejado and Honra e Pátria e Paz e Concórdia, the most important works of the second phase of his career, all painted for the republican officialdom. Those of the first phase are majestic, erudite and typically romantic works. Those of the second, except for Tiradentes Esquartejado, which is a piece of harsh realism, are typical allegories of eclectic and sentimental Pompier art. Stylistically, the set of his historical paintings reflects the transformations of the dominant trends in the academic universe of his time. In his career as a historical painter, Américo always sparked heated controversies, being idolized by some and execrated by others.

=== Biblical paintings and other themes ===
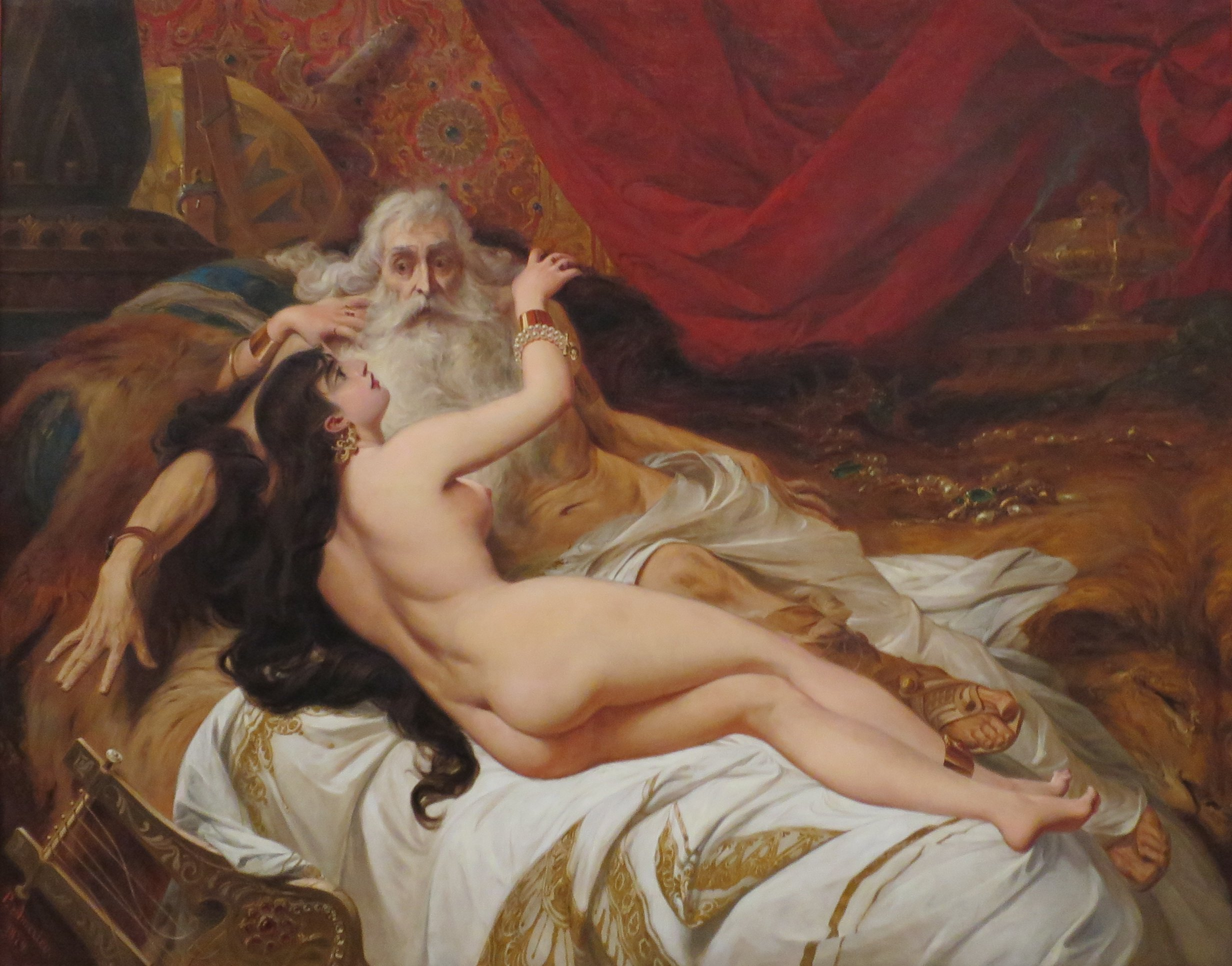
David em seus últimos dias é aquecido pela jovem Abisag, 1879, National Museum of Fine Arts

Despite being best known for his civic paintings, these constitute but a fraction of Américo's complete work. When writing in 1864 for the painter Victor Meirelles, Américo stated that it was the biblical theme, especially the Old Testament, that most attracted him: "My nature is different. I don't think I bend easily to the passing demands of the customs of each age... my passion, only sacred history satisfies it." Américo devoted most of the second phase of his career to this genre, also highly regarded by academics, considered a branch of historical painting, starting in the 1880s. Despite their religious theme, biblical paintings typified their bourgeois romanticism by decorative emphasis and for the love for exoticism. In addition to being a personal preference, they were a reflection of a change in context and catered to the taste of a new, bourgeois and sentimental audience, which was not a market for traditional historical works, but began to appreciate images that were more related to their own reality or were consumables without further complications. Despite preferring the biblical themes as inspiration, Américo did not fail to penetrate other popular areas at the time, bringing literary and medievalist themes to the canvases as well.

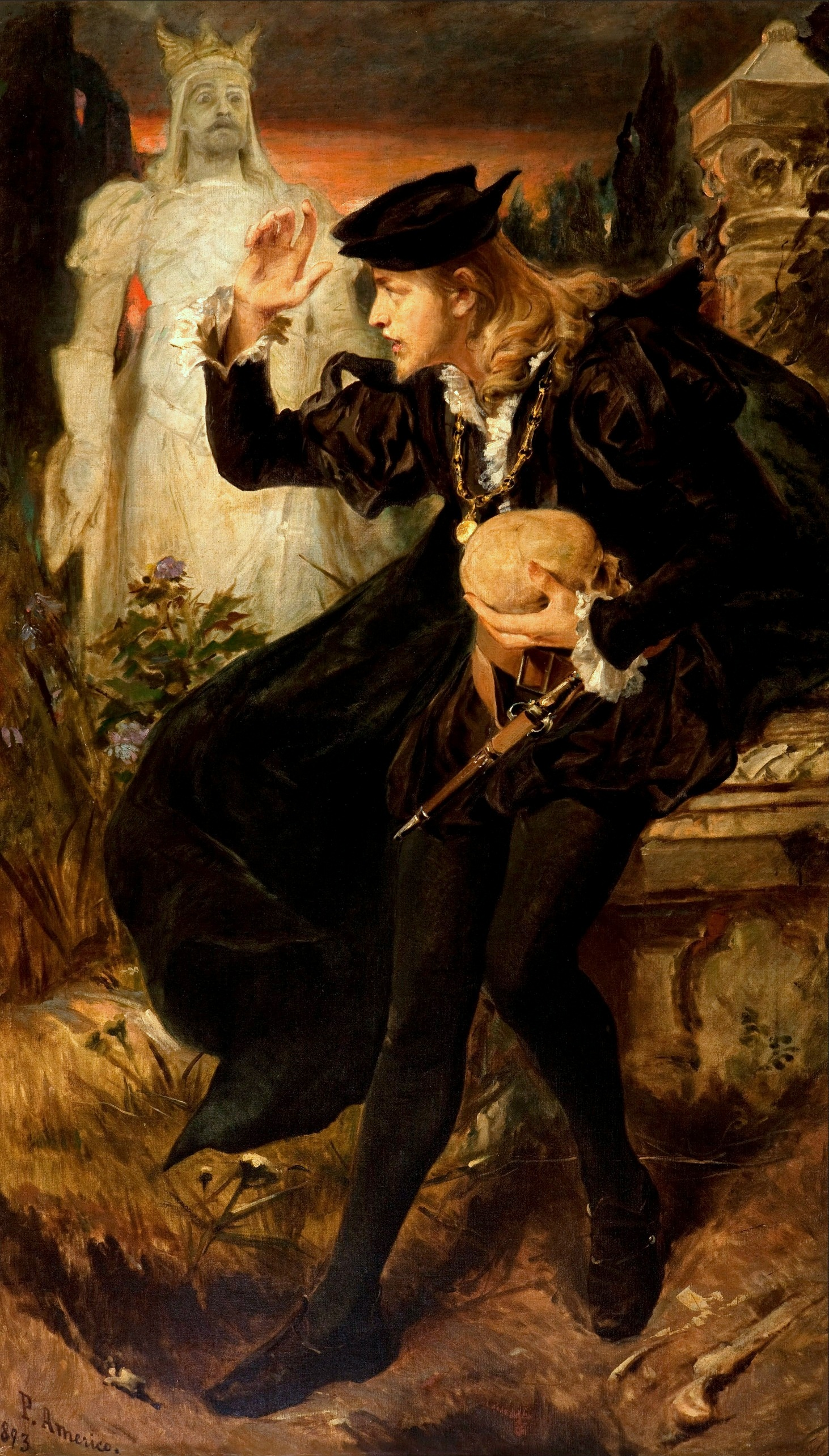
Visão de Hamlet, 1893, São Paulo Picture Gallery

In part, this shift in general preferences towards the prosaic and accessible were due to the rise of realistic aesthetics, progressively incorporated by academics at the end of the 19th century, and the popularization of photography, which painters such as Pedro Américo began to make use of as a painting aid. In this context, academic painting continued to be appreciated by the bourgeoisie, which did not despise either the prestige aura with which it was still covered, nor the high technical quality of its production. Ivan Coelho de Sá noted that:

"Bourgeois society, both in Europe and in Brazil – where it had a late development as a result of the historical mismatch – had a very strong identification with academicism, above all for the thematic wealth and versatility that made possible a true journey to a world of dream and fantasy: Greco-Roman heroism, historical revivalism, biblical and literary drama, bucolism, oriental exoticism and new urban types. At a time when there was still no cinema, whose first steps were only taken at the end of the 19th century, theater and, above all, opera, were the only rivals to the visual, rhetorical and narrative potential of academic art."

For this audience, Pedro Américo left a significant production, although little studied, remaining in the shadow of his historical paintings. This part of his work was severely criticized by the modernists as they thought it had an excess of sentimentality and intellectualism, which would have led Américo to affectation and artificiality. Such attacks left such a negative mark on him that to this day this production is largely forgotten or despised. Among the works of this theme that can be highlighted are David em seus últimos dias é aquecido pela jovem Abisag, a rare piece for its provocative sensualism, the second version of A Carioca, Abelardo e Heloísa, Judite rende graças a Jeová por ter conseguido livrar sua pátria dos horrores de Holofernes, O Voto de Heloísa, Os filhos de Eduardo IV, A rabequista árabe, Joana d'Arc ouve pela primeira vez a voz que lhe prediz o seu alto destino, Visão de Hamlet and Jocabed levando Moisés até o Nilo.

== Written works ==
=== Essays and critical texts ===
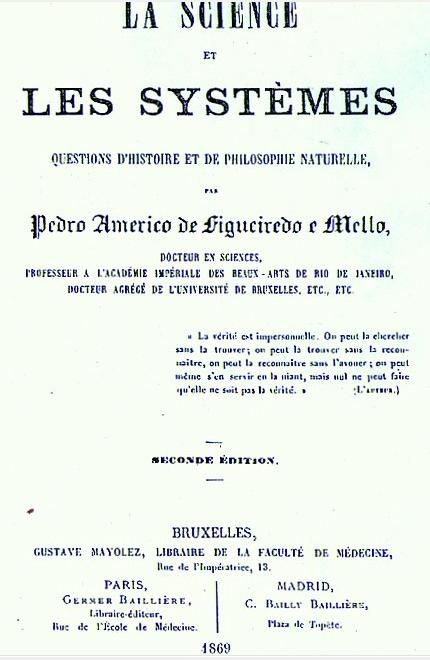
Cover of Américo's thesis, 2nd French edition, 1869

Pedro Américo also left several theoretical works in history, natural philosophy and fine arts, as well as poetry and novels. However, this production is much less known and studied than his paintings, and its value has been questioned, but it is important for revealing other facets of Américos's thinking. His first literary essays were poems written while he was studying at the Pedro II College, and his most relevant text is Science and Systems: Questions of Natural History and Philosophy, a thesis he defended at the Free University of Brussels. Considered the summary of his philosophical conception, he was well received and secured the position of adjunct professor at the university. The thesis dealt with the historical evolution of the arts, philosophy and science, seeking a Renaissance universality of thought, and handled a great number of erudite references from various areas of knowledge. Carolina Invernizio's analysis highlighted Américo's opposition to positivism, a very influential philosophy in France and Brazil at the time, and his more direct affiliation, according to Sílvio Romero and José de Carvalho, was the spiritualist strand of French eclecticism, approaching the thinking of Victor Cousin, Jules Michelet and Edgar Quinet. For Américo, science, as well as art, should be exempt from particular obligations, abolishing dogmas, arbitrary opinions and exclusivist systems, seeing as essential to their flourishing free investigation, free creation and free thought. In the thesis preface, Américo warned that:

"If this book had been written in Brazil, it would certainly lack local color, since none of the issues that I address with some developments are treated here from a national point of view; therefore, anyone who reads it without thinking about this fact – that the moral and intellectual situation of Europe differs greatly from ours – would find it, in many ways, empty and meaningless. But, is it necessary to write a book to prove that science is free? To prove that we perhaps have an immaterial soul, or else that man is a rational animal?... But for anyone who has followed the historical development of science and knows the current situation of spirits in Europe, all these questions present themselves as many other problems whose solutions, constantly challenged by exclusivist spirits, always deserve to be renewed in the truest and most impartial sense".

His other essays generally dealt with the same themes, pointing to education as the premise of progress, debating the nature of beauty and the ideal, affirming the primacy of art in the social order and its inherent educational and civilizing role, valuing the testimony of history and scientific investigation, and preaching an alliance between reason and sensitivity in the classical way. The same inclination can be seen in part of his correspondence and in the texts on aesthetics and art history that he published through newspapers, such as the Philosophical Considerations on Fine Arts among the Ancients: Art as an Educational Principle (1864), published as a series of 22 articles in the newspaper Correio Mercantil, in Rio de Janeiro, which constituted a pioneering milestone in the history of education and the press in Brazil. His writing is generally very articulate, moving quickly between diverse references. In these works, Américo also often made social, economic, historical and political criticism, complaining about Brazil's backwardness in relation to European nations, pointing out sources of problems and suggesting solutions, often challenging authorities and the government, and trying to understand the cultural phenomenon under a perspective integrated to the whole of society and to the complex of determinants at work in each historical moment.

His participation in the politics of the new republic as a deputy yielded several speeches and projects, collected and published as Discursos Parlamentares (1892), where, often, disillusioned, he criticized the inertia and immaturity of public power, denounced the similarity between monarchical rhetoric and the republican one and deplored the general backwardness in which Brazil lived. He mainly defended the creation of free public museums and universities as indispensable institutions in a complete public education system, and as bases for the constitution of a genuinely Brazilian culture. But, according to Francisca Gois Barros, these ideas "did not impress the enlightened assembly, essentially attentive to the serious problems of the country's political reconstitution... gems in an opulent but forgotten herbarium".

=== Novels ===
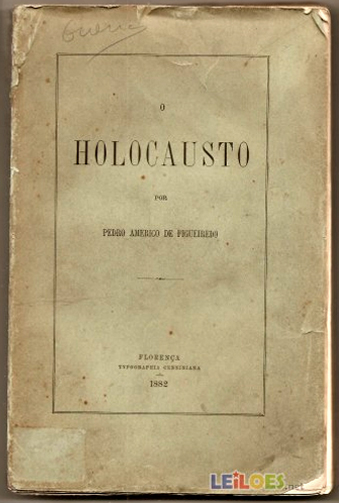
Cover of Holocausto, 1882 edition

His novels are ultra-romantic narratives of extreme sentimentality, associated with a realistic, almost photographic description of environments and details. They are semi-autobiographical, manichean, argumentative, asymmetrical, proselytizing, in which typically young men from poor families, but with integrity, heroically try to climb the steps of improvement by their own effort, in the midst of infinite torments and the opposition of the forces of evil, represented by the incomprehension, envy, lack of perspective and the apathy of others. In fact, in his four novels, three have protagonists who were born and lived their youth in the sertão, a Brazilian region where Américo was born and raised, notorious for the poverty of its population and for its semi-arid environment. In the novel Holocausto, Américo's hometown, which serves as the setting for the plot, is vividly described in its geographical details and urban profile. As the protagonists are sensitive young people, they are inclined towards the arts, but for that very reason they suffer more intensely in the face of misfortunes. They fall in love with equally virtuous and intellectual girls, but their love is also opposed by treacherous and evil people. In general, these pure young people live martyred, victims of their own innate nobility and sophistication, etiolated in a barbaric and rude environment. The result is often tragic. The plots are not limited to fiction, delving into social, political and cultural issues present in their time. In the introduction to Holocausto, a "philosophical novel of character and customs", the best known of his novels, appreciated by Joaquim Nabuco, Giulio Piccini and other intellectuals from Brazil and Europe, Américo presents the didactic intention:

"Inspired by the vivid recollection of events which have largely taken place in my presence, or in that of friends worthy of the greatest credit, the story of the singular existence that I have tried to sketch here will serve to demonstrate how much our society has progressed in the last quarter of a century, and, at the same time, how far it has to walk to deserve the incomparable country that God has designated for us as a scenario."

However, right at the beginning of the novel, the gypsy character Rhadamina makes a dismal prediction for the protagonist, Agavino, which serves as the structuring axis of the entire narrative — all the gypsy's predictions are confirmed — and allows the reader to capture something of the oppressive psychological atmosphere which is very present in the text, as well as analyzing Américo's writing style:

"You will be a great wretch, because you have talents, virtues and a pure heart. I don't need to read your destiny in the palm of your right hand, because it is written on your forehead and in your actions. Oh, how it will be for you. Sad existence!... People, country, great and small, wise and ignorant, everything will mock you when they see you pass, saddened and afflicted, on the path of duty and sacrifice. Sad and lonely like a convict in his cell, nor at least you will be able to smile at the woman you love, without immediately feeling on your lips the bitterness of myrrh and the brush of wild thistle. In vain you will invoke the justice of men: it will mock your naivety, and even chase you for madness. Expeled from the bosom of your fatherland, you shall return to it like a weaning child... The balm of hope will be withheld from you... Do you know what the last sip of your cup of bitterness will be? This one will fulminate you! Finally, human science itself, in which you believe, and with which you have just threatened me, will mutilate your corpse to prove to the curious that you had the physical insides of a miscreant! Here is the reward of your virtue! And now that you have heard, go, walk and suffer: it will be of your own free will!."

In Na Cidade Eterna, the desolate lament of Heitor de Montalvano, its tragic hero, a solitary man "with a torn soul", but pure and upright, who struggled ingloriously against politics, "the monster without entrails", essentially repeats the same theme:

"For those who know the mirages produced by the imagination of a thirsty soul, and has already tasted the sadness generated by the disappointments of existence, only the inner world is worthy of sheltering them, as well as containing the ideals that still surround them as a last caress; only the mastery of these impalpable realities born in the depths of feeling and illuminated by the beam of poetry have the charms that can ease the pains of a life not comforted by hopes."

== Critical reception ==
=== The artist, politics and history ===
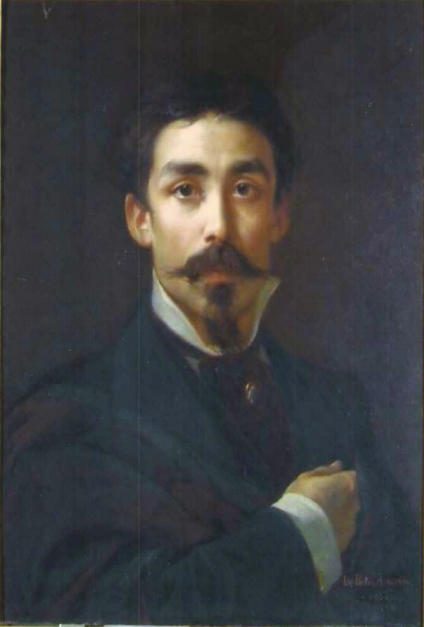
Self-portrait, 1877, Uffizi Gallery

A charismatic and controversial figure, Américo had a unique intellectual preparation among Brazilian artists of his time, and he had a high opinion of himself and his achievements. He was "deified, fought, loved and rejected", as Gonzaga Duque had said. Américo produced a complex and eclectic work, was involved in major controversies throughout his career and made countless friends and detractors both in life and posthumously. In 1871, when Américo was less than 30 years old, his first biography appeared, written by Luís Guimarães Júnior, a laudatory and dramatic propaganda piece symptomatically entitled Um Milionário de Glórias, which was distributed throughout Brazil and also published abroad, placing Américo in the position of heroic founder of the Brazilian school of painting, and which is the primary source of the various biographies that emerged later, almost all of which were also partial and exaggerated in the contemporary perspective, but which reveal the intensity of the enthusiasm that Américo and his work could arouse. In the opinion of Silvano Bezerra da Silva, the different activities he performed, as an artist, essayist, politician, novelist, and others, "in addition to indicating a restless personality, also indicate Pedro Américo's insistence on overcoming the limitations of the environment, and to impose himself as an intellectual endowed with plural qualities". But in the words of Rafael Cardoso, "anyone who knows a little about Pedro Américo's biography and writings will know that it is not appropriate to attach too much importance to his almost unlimited self-contemplation. It is not surprising that a man who, in addition to considering himself the greatest painter of his the time, boasted of having refuted Bacon, Kant and Comte in the field of philosophy and even risked as a novelist, attributed to his own works a high historical value".

Américo was a negotiator.

Ernesto Gomes Moreira Maia, interim director of Imperial Academy, was an example: "The paintings by Dr. Pedro Américo, almost all of them suitable only for galleries due to their dimensions, form a collection of great merit, both for their perfect execution and for the feeling of an idealistic composition; and although the artist's detractors look for imaginary defects in them, the paintings will remain for the glory of their author and the school from which they came, and the honor of those who give them due appreciation". Laudelino Freire also remarked that: "The work of Pedro Américo... stands out in the creative unity of the manifestations of genius. At no time in our evolution, painting had brushes that translated it with accents of such high inspiration of the noblest thought and superiority of expression". And diplomat José Manuel Cardoso de Oliveira stated that he was "a noble and sympathetic figure, a hero through the power of will, a genius through his talent, a master through his wisdom, a model through his virtues, an athlete through his work".

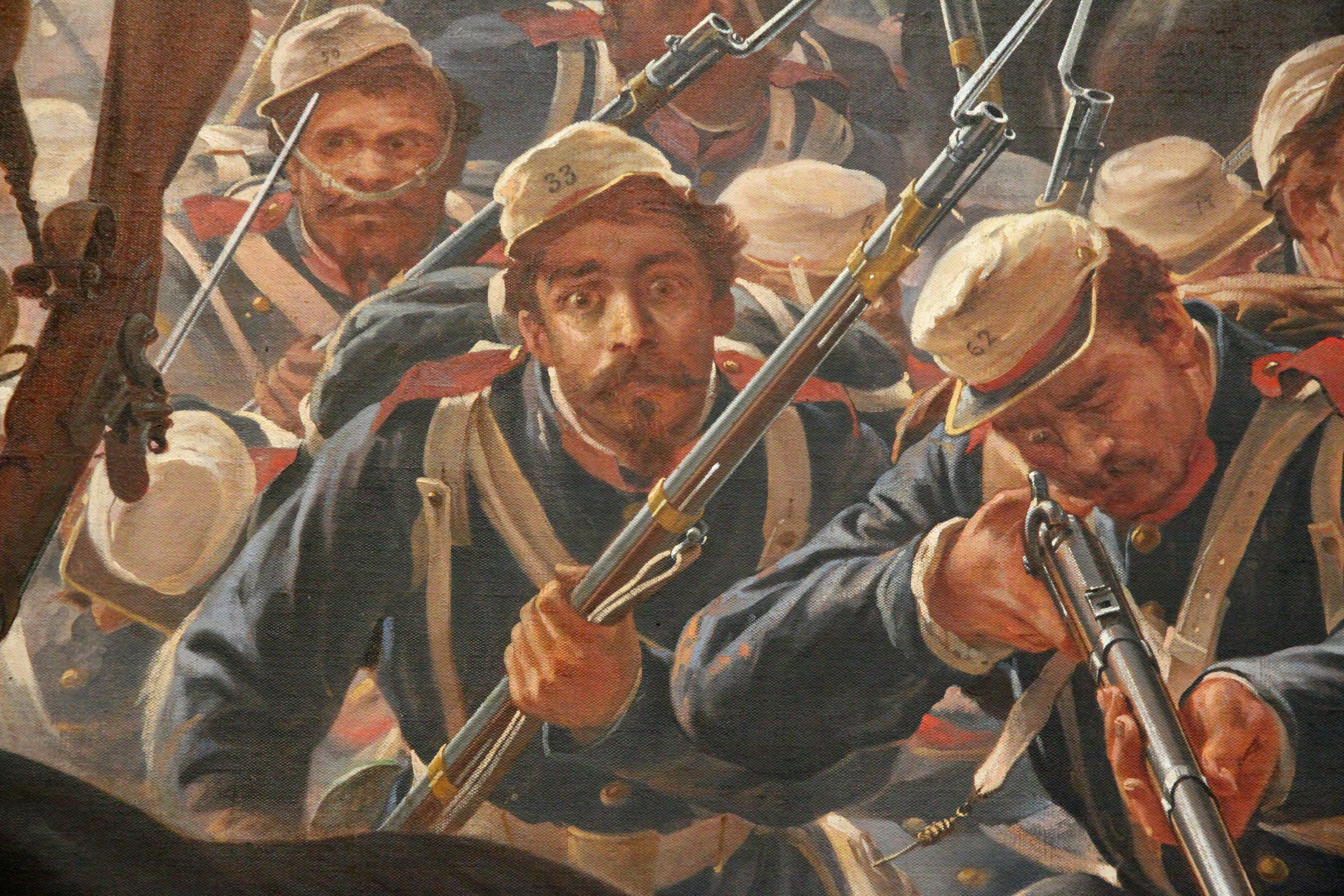
Américo's self-portrait as soldier 33 in the painting Batalha do Avaí

Américo's adhered to the imperial government's program in the 1870s, and his initial success largely depended on it, but whether it was sincere is not known for certain. He always sought to reaffirm his intellectual independence, criticized the problems of the political and cultural system, apparently being a republican and democrat from an early age; Gonzaga Duque called him an opportunist. Américo was ambitious and knew how to take advantage of his context and to adapt to political and aesthetic changes, but for several authors his humanism and his interest in the main evolutionary lines of human culture were genuine, and not mere rhetoric. In any case, he was an active part of the cultural process that was underway in Brazil. In a speech he gave in 1870 in the presence of the emperor, on the occasion of the inauguration of the Aesthetics and Art History course at the Imperial Academy, Pedro Américo described the artists as "true prophets of civilization" engaged "in the battles of progress". As Rafael Cardoso analyzed:

"His speech emphasizes the urgent need to invest in the education of artists, 'whose productions will be the symbol of our times, when the centuries to come anxiously interrogate the codices of the past'. From the point of view of the longing centuries to come, these statements are especially revealing due to the historical moment in which they were made: shortly after the end of the Paraguayan War but before the main representations of its battles came to light (from 1871 onwards) in the form of historical paintings, including those by Pedro Américo himself: His speech foreshadows, and almost enunciates in a programmatic way, the enormous critical and ideological repercussion that would be reached by some of these paintings, culminating.... in the 'battles' of public opinion around the 25th General Exhibition of Fine Arts, or Salon of 1879. For now, what matters is to register the clear awareness that the artist had of being engaged in a process of producing the symbols of his time".

This discourse echoed in several other critical sources, which established a kind of equivalence between Brazilian military and artistic efforts, in short, endorsing Pedro Américo's statements about national glory as a "legitimate daughter" of the encounter between the conquests of the war and the intellectual conquests of peace, coming to be called a "hero" and "patriot", and compared to the combatants of the Paraguayan War. At that moment, the war was a factor of intense national union, possibly "the fundamental milestone in the crystallization of national identity during the Second Reign", as Cardoso argues, "in which the elites of all Brazilian regions freely chose to jointly participate in a nationality project, based on the liberal values of modern Europe", considering Brazil an "evolved" people – as their artistic successes proved and trumpeted – who had the right to militarily civilize the Paraguayan "barbarians". This progressive vision of art as an educational tool and a vital phenomenon for the evolution of societies was deepened and expanded to exhaustion in his many writings.

On the other hand, some critics believed that Américo's long stays in Europe were an escape from Brazil, in whose history he would have little interest. His personal thematic preferences, as he himself stated, were heading in another direction. Be that as it may, it was on his historical works that his most enduring memory was built, works that acquired, like few others, the status of national icons in Brazil.

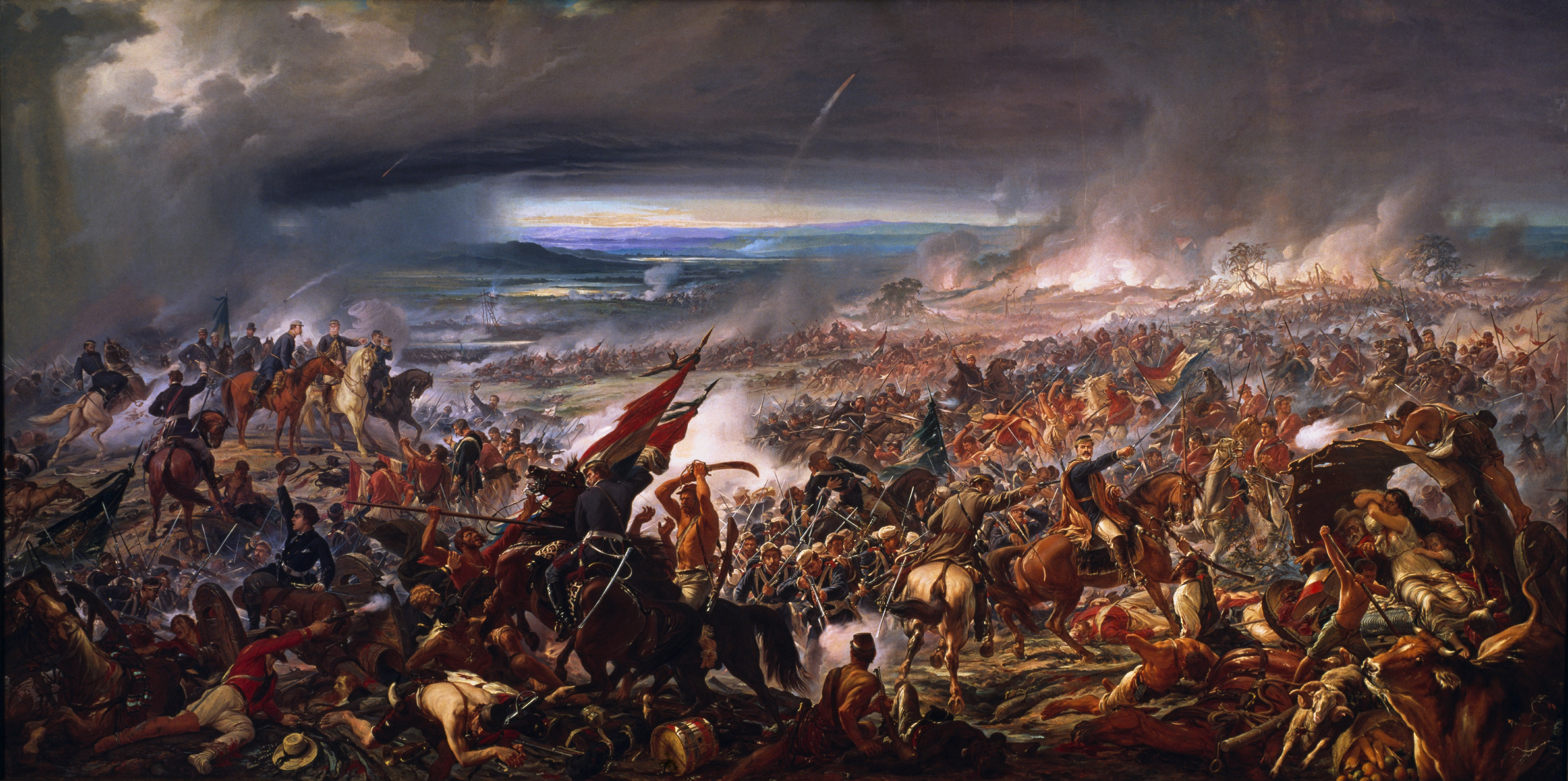
Batalha do Avaí, 6×11m, 1877, National Museum of Fine Arts

=== Between tradition and modernity ===
Even with much praise, Américo's work was not immune to the scrutiny of critics linked to emerging modernism. For Gonzaga Duque, after Batalha do Avaí – which although "confusing", "incomprehensible" and "full of defects" was "the greatest work of art that Brazil has" – Américo had stagnated: "No progress has been made in the span of five years... I will not say, however, that it has stopped forever; this is not the case; but I will say that some power, above the artist's will, has removed his mentality from the works of our time, from our aspirations of our aesthetic feeling, of the needs of our time". Duque also attacked Américo's philosophical writings and novels, saying that the artist embarked on areas that did not concern him, only out of vanity, and whose fruits were anachronisms that only satisfied frivolous spirits: "It was not enough for him to conquer the secrets of his art, he wished moreover, he sought the honors of a parchment, graduated from the Sorbonne and then obtained a doctorate in Belgium. The crisis of greatness came to him, which repeated itself several times in his life". Angelo Agostini was relentless in his sarcasm. About A Noite com os gênios do Estudo e do Amor, Agostini said that Américo threw "whipped egg whites into space! Nice thought (if it is his), but as for the execution... detestable! What a disaster!"; about Judite rende graças a Jeová por ter conseguido livrar sua pátria dos horrores de Holofernes, Agostini stated that "[she] thanks Jehovah for having managed to behead Holofernes without bleeding or wrinkling her beautiful toilet, nor her beautiful hands. What cleanliness!"; and about Jocabed levando Moisés até o Nilo, who on the painting raises her hand to her face with an anxious expression, Agostini commented that "before parting with her son, Moses' mother feels a deep toothache." Oscar Guanabarino stated that:

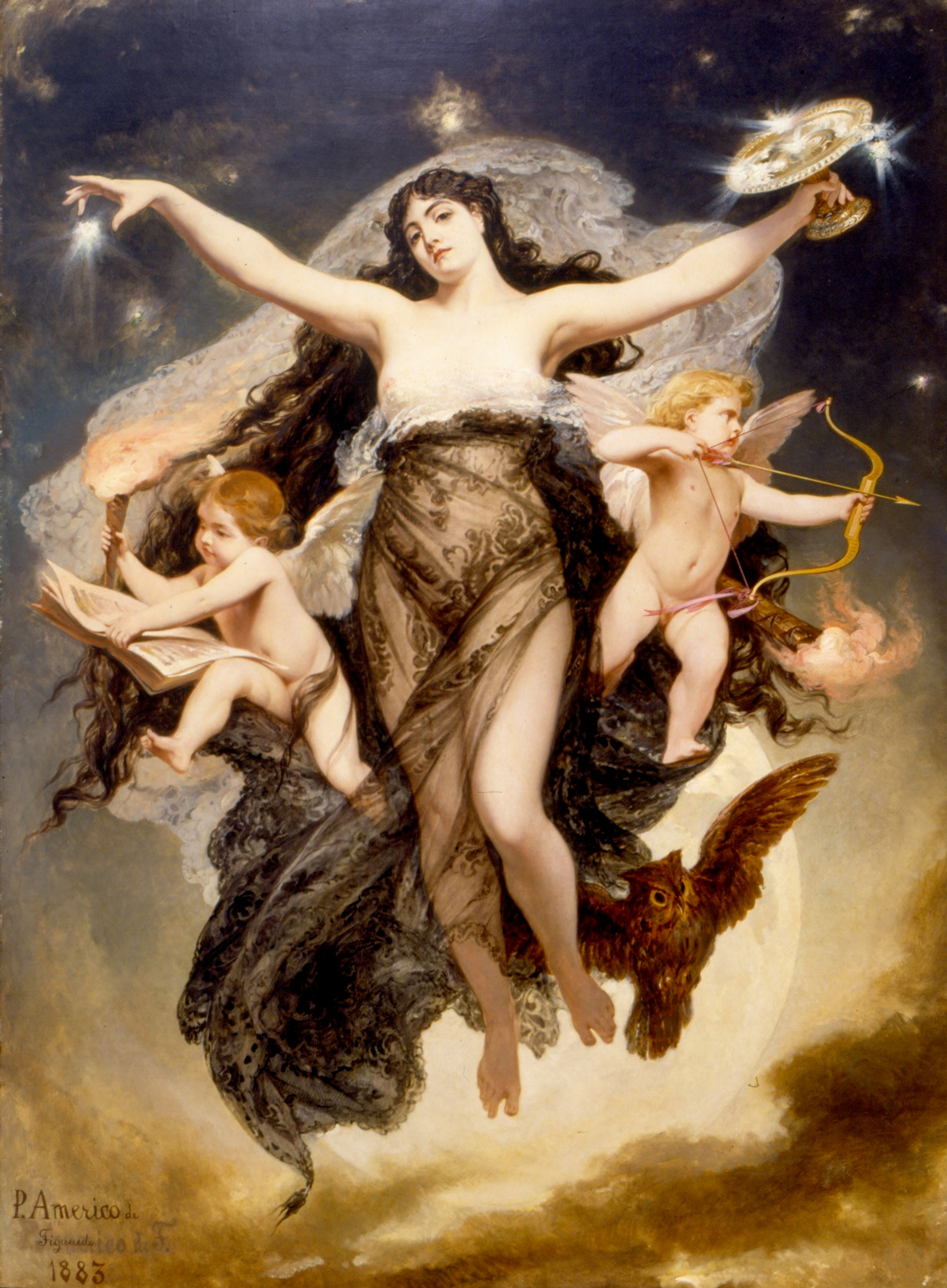
A Noite com os gênios do Estudo e do Amor, 1883, National Museum of Fine Arts

"Historical painting, so recommended and demanded, always presented historical facts that had no relation to our lives. Pedro Américo, professor of archeology, falling into constant errors in this matter, gave us Joan of Arc, Moses, Judith, Heloise and Abelard, Voltaire, and so many other paintings of foreign themes, when our own history still was, as it is, unexplored; and as this painter was the one who gave the note at that time, all the others followed him in the waters and there came the biblical collections, in which St. Jerome did not fail".

The controversies that Américo's works often caused were aimed not only at him as an artist, but also as a symbol. For Cybele Fernandes, "in fact, the Academy of Fine Arts and the entire system that it represented, its methods, processes, teachers, and politics, as well as the maturation of society in relation to art and its social function were also evaluated".

Although Américo's civic paintings rose to fame as soon as they were exposed and recognized by the establishment, as was the case with Batalha de Campo Grande, Batalha do Avaí and Independência ou Morte!, they still bothered enough people, who saw in them a falsification of the factual truth of the events portrayed. According to Elias Saliba, in that period of accelerated technical and scientific innovations, the large public was already used to the visual fidelity of photography, and wished to see in the historical paintings the same scientific accuracy, and no longer the abstract and idealistic conventions of the old academic tradition. However, there were no image records of the events he painted, and despite his extensive prior documentary research, the artist found it very difficult to:

"mentally restore, and clothe in the material appearances of the real, all the particularities of an event that took place more than half a century ago, especially when it was not transmitted to us by contemporaries skilled in the art of observing and describing. The difficulty grows in proportion to the artist's needs – a kind of historian bound by the demands of aesthetics and the uncertainties of tradition – to identify circumstances whose veracity can be doubted, and which not even because they are real deserve the attention of history and the consecration of the beautiful".

Commenting on these aspects in the case of Independência ou Morte!, Consuelo Schlichta considered that, according to the academic perspective, if necessary, the truth would need to be falsified in order to create a convincing and moving impression of truth. According to some reports, emperor Pedro I, who was in the midst of a trip to São Paulo, upon receiving the news that led him to proclaim Brazil's independence, was found suffering pains from a "gastric illness". To make matters worse, he had a donkey for a mount and was accompanied by a handful of soldiers who in all probability wore shabby, smelly uniforms. Naturally, the representation of "truth", in this exemplary case, would have an effect completely opposite to what was intended, which was to enshrine a true founding myth and glorify the "author" of the independent nation. It was necessary, more than evoking history, to invent it, and more than inventing it, to theatricalize it, so that the memory in focus could be influentially crystallized in the people's imagination according to a pre-established program. Thus, Dom Pedro, placed at the center of the entire composition, in the work of Pedro Américo ceases to be a mere mortal and a controversial ruler to become an icon, the savior of the homeland, the perfect hero and leader, riding a dashing horse, in full dress uniform and commanding a battalion of equally shiny and intrepid dragoons, who respond to the memorable cry in a univocal, vigorous and harmonious way and represent, together with some peasants who watch the scene, the entire Brazilian people, strong, loyal and united. Américo himself stated that:

"Reality inspires, it does not enslave the painter. What it contains worthy of being offered to public contemplation inspires him, but what it hides contrary to the designs of art does not enslave him, which often coincide with the designs of history. And if the historian removes from his paintings all the disturbing incidents of the clarity of his lessons and the magnitude of his ends, with much more reason does the artist, who proceeds dominated by the idea of the aesthetic impression he must produce on the spectator".

The contradiction of the controversies about being modern or being faithful to the facts was that while many criticized the falsity of the compositions, in several aspects the painter was very faithful to reality. Pedro Américo, like many other painters of his generation, effectively used photographs as a model to describe the topography of the scenarios, the individual details and characterizations, the cavalry and war equipment. In fact, there was a lot of popular consumption and easily accessible iconography about soldiers and militias. Américo even carried out field research and requested interviews, documents and photographic portraits of some of the still-living characters who participated in historical events, seeking a realistic pictorial transposition to these elements. Probably his scientific training also inclined him to this – although he himself rejected the label of a realist painter – and by adopting this anti-academic, anti-idealist procedure, he received a partial approval by the critics of the academy, who considered him a renovator of the historical genre in comparison to the more "old-fashioned" and "conservative" Victor Meirelles. He thus placed himself in a sense at the forefront, although in other aspects the premodernists still saw him as a formal scholar. However, Américo proposed reforms in the academic system to accompany the evolution of the times and incorporate the aesthetic diversity that existed in his time in many texts, and even rebelled against the excess of idealism of the more traditional academics and the School of Fine Arts in Paris.

In 1943, with the celebrations of the centenary of Américo's birth, Gilberto Freyre and José Lins do Rego, important intellectuals in Brazil, spoke about him. Despite the moment being a tribute, Freyre still repeated modernist criticisms in his questioning of the favors that Américo enjoyed from the government and his supposed lack of "Brazilianness", and although Rego admired his figure "without limits" and paid him countless compliments, he confessed that his art did not please him much, calling him a "great man who had failed" and repeated Freyre's arguments about the absence of local color in his production: "There is no light from the tropics for him. There is no human element, there is no woman, no mulatto, no black, the sun-tanned Brazilian, the simple men who shopped at his father's Daniel store". But he ended his article by saying that "if there was greatness in the empire of Dom Pedro II, Pedro Américo is one of the strongest, one of those that has the strength to overcome time". On the other hand, Sérgio Milliet, another intellectual, in his 1944 book Pintura quase sempre, did not even mention Américo's famous battles.

=== Plagiarism accusations ===
Américo was twice accused of plagiarism, in the works Batalha do Avaí and Independência ou Morte! The first, said to be copied from Giovanni Fattori's painting on the Battle of Montebello, and the second, from Ernest Meissonier's work on the Battle of Friedland. The issue caused controversy at the time. If there was imitation, its intentionality has never been proven, and if there are similar elements between the paintings, this is most likely due to the habit, common to all academic artists, of replicating or varying formal stereotyped models widely used within the visual repertoire of the academic style. About Independência ou Morte!, according to Pedro Américo, he only got to know the other work a year after he had finished his. Américo himself preferred to expose the problem in his Discourse on Plagiarism, where he defended the idea that what matters most in art is not the invention of new forms, but their constant improvement. In fact, the entire academic system was largely based on the authority of consecrated masters and on the perpetuation, both imitative and creative, of the foundations they left behind; the concept of plagiarism was just beginning to be articulated in the way it is known today.

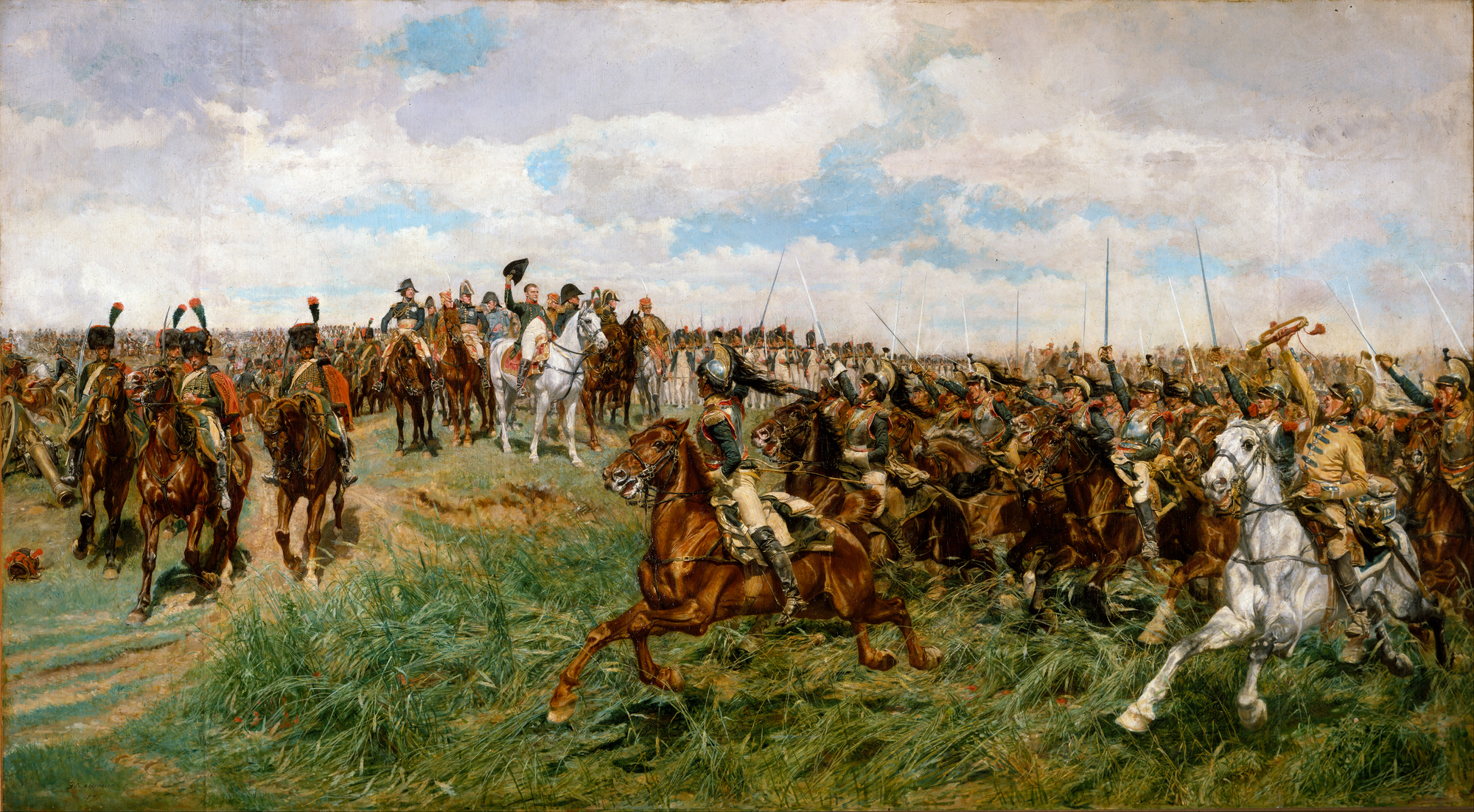
Charge of the French Cuirassiers at Friedland (1875), by Meissonier.

Independência ou Morte! (1888), by Pedro Américo.

=== Decorations and homages ===
While still alive, Pedro Américo received the honors of Historical Painter from the Imperial Chamber; Officer, Grand Dignitary and Commander of the Imperial Order of the Rose; Grand Knight of the Order of the Holy Sepulcher and was decorated by king William I of Prussia. He was a member of several European academies. He is the patron of chair number 24 of the Academy of Letters of Paraíba. His painting Fala do Trono was printed on a Telebrás system phone card. He gives his name to a square in João Pessoa and has a bust in his honor in via Maggio in Florence. In his hometown there is a street named after him and the house where he was born today is as a museum in his memory. The cover art of the album As Days Get Dark by Arab Strap features one of his paintings.

== Gallery ==
Pedro Américo's selected works

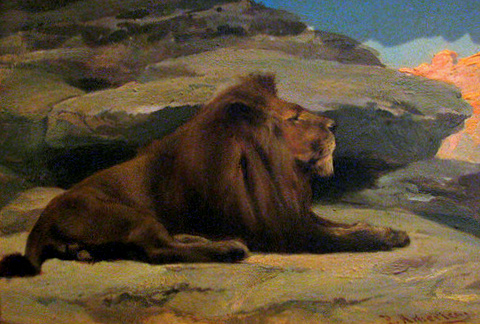
Leão

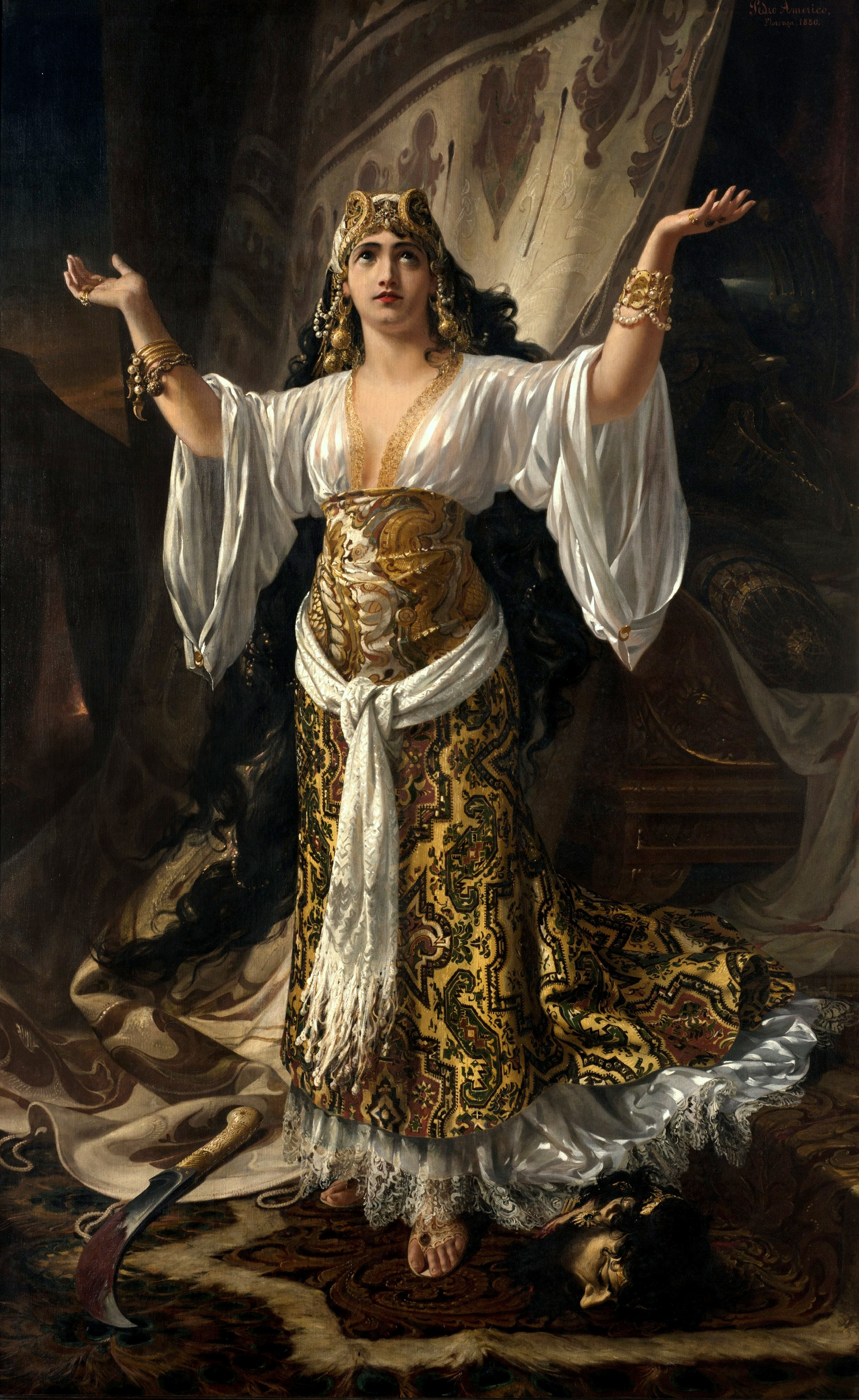
Judite rende graças a Jeová por ter conseguido livrar sua pátria dos horrores de Holofernes

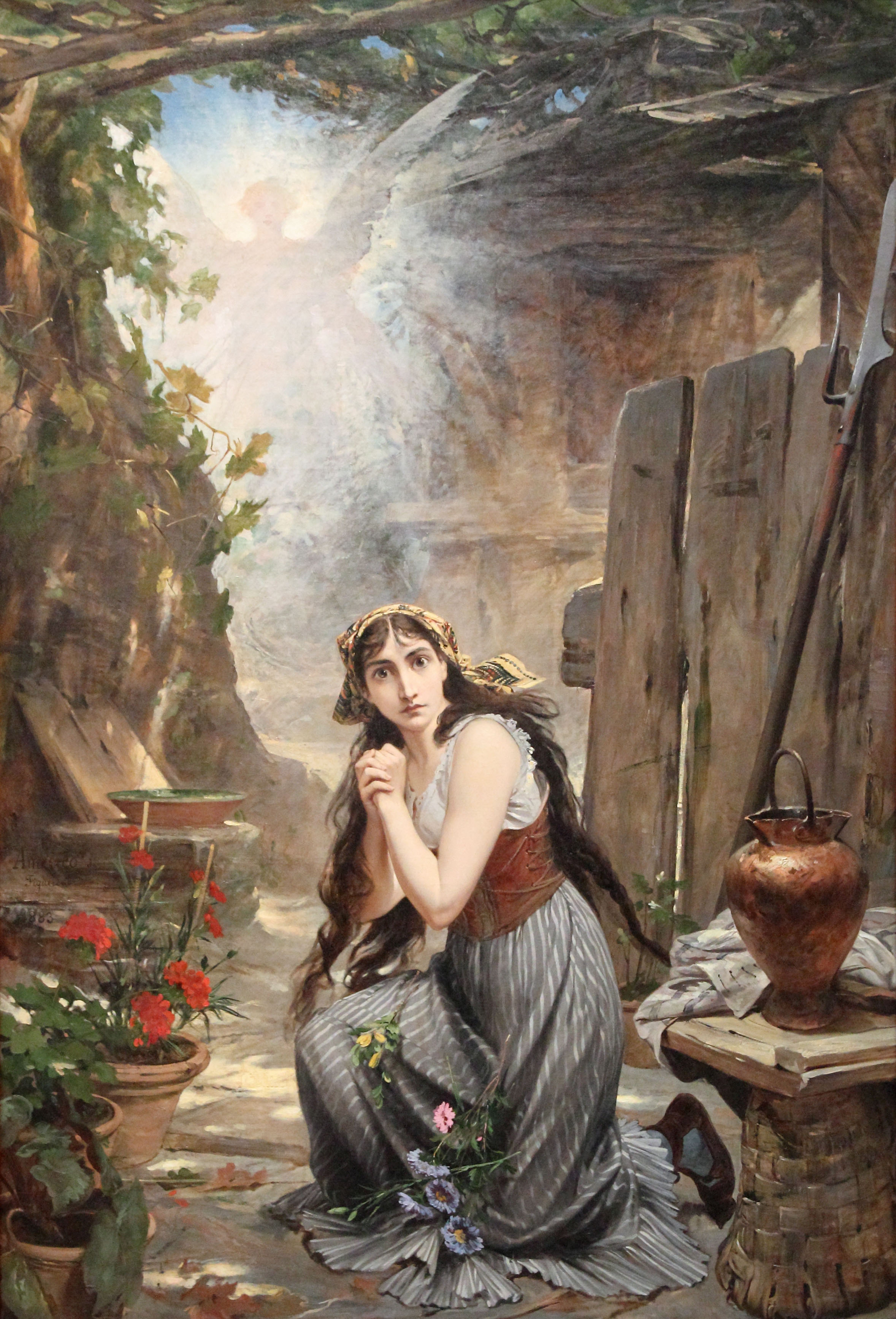
Joana d'Arc ouve pela primeira vez a voz que lhe prediz o seu alto destino

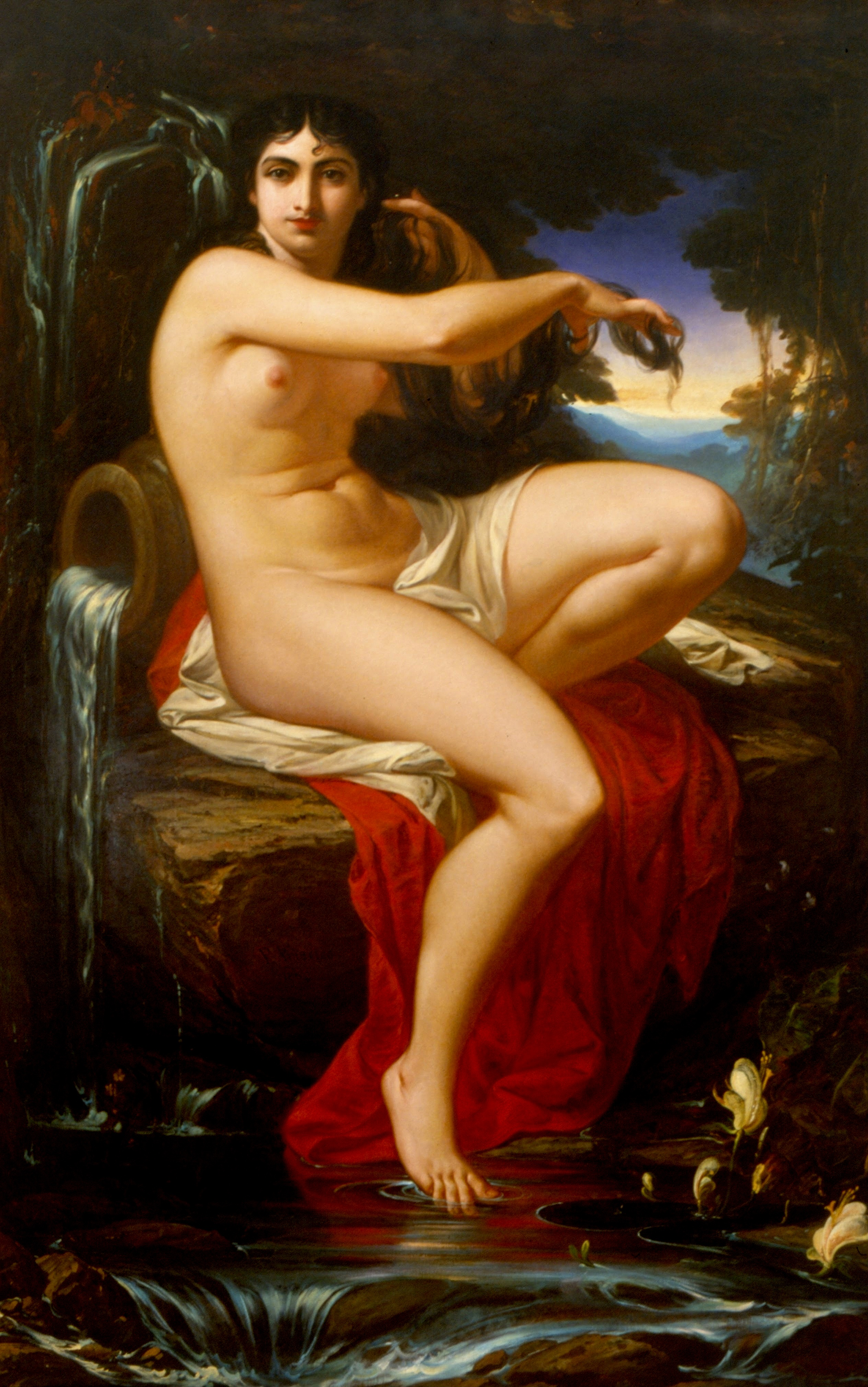
A carioca

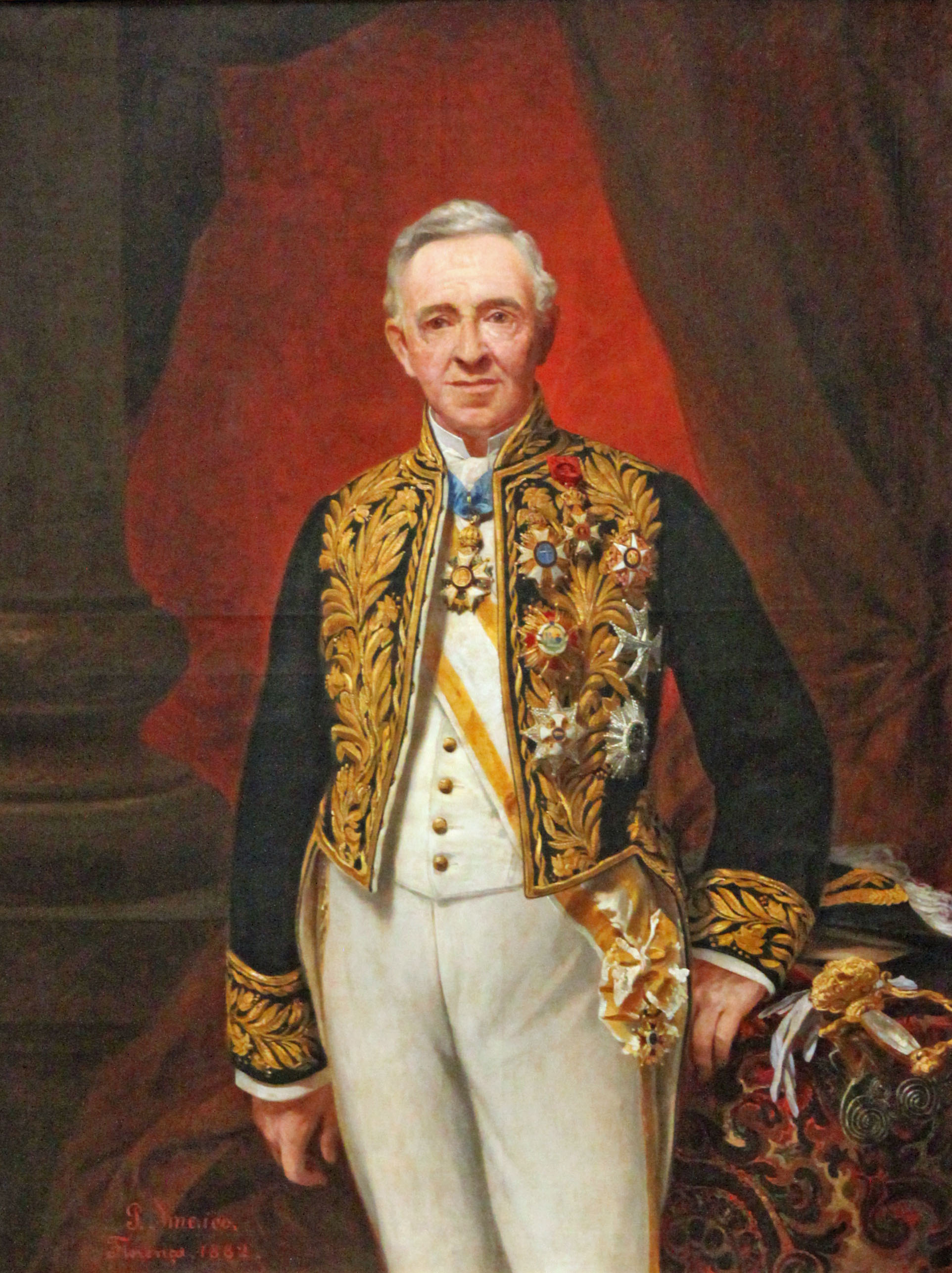
Retrato do Conselheiro Filipe Lopes Neto

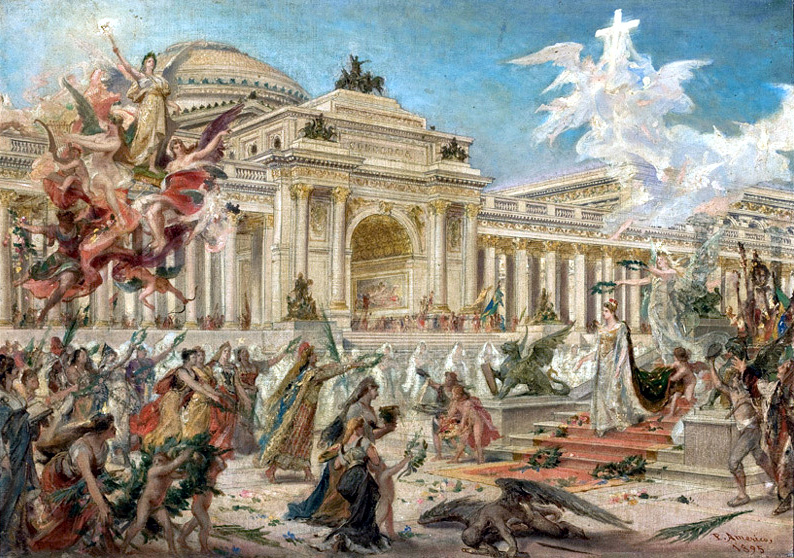
Paz e Concórdia

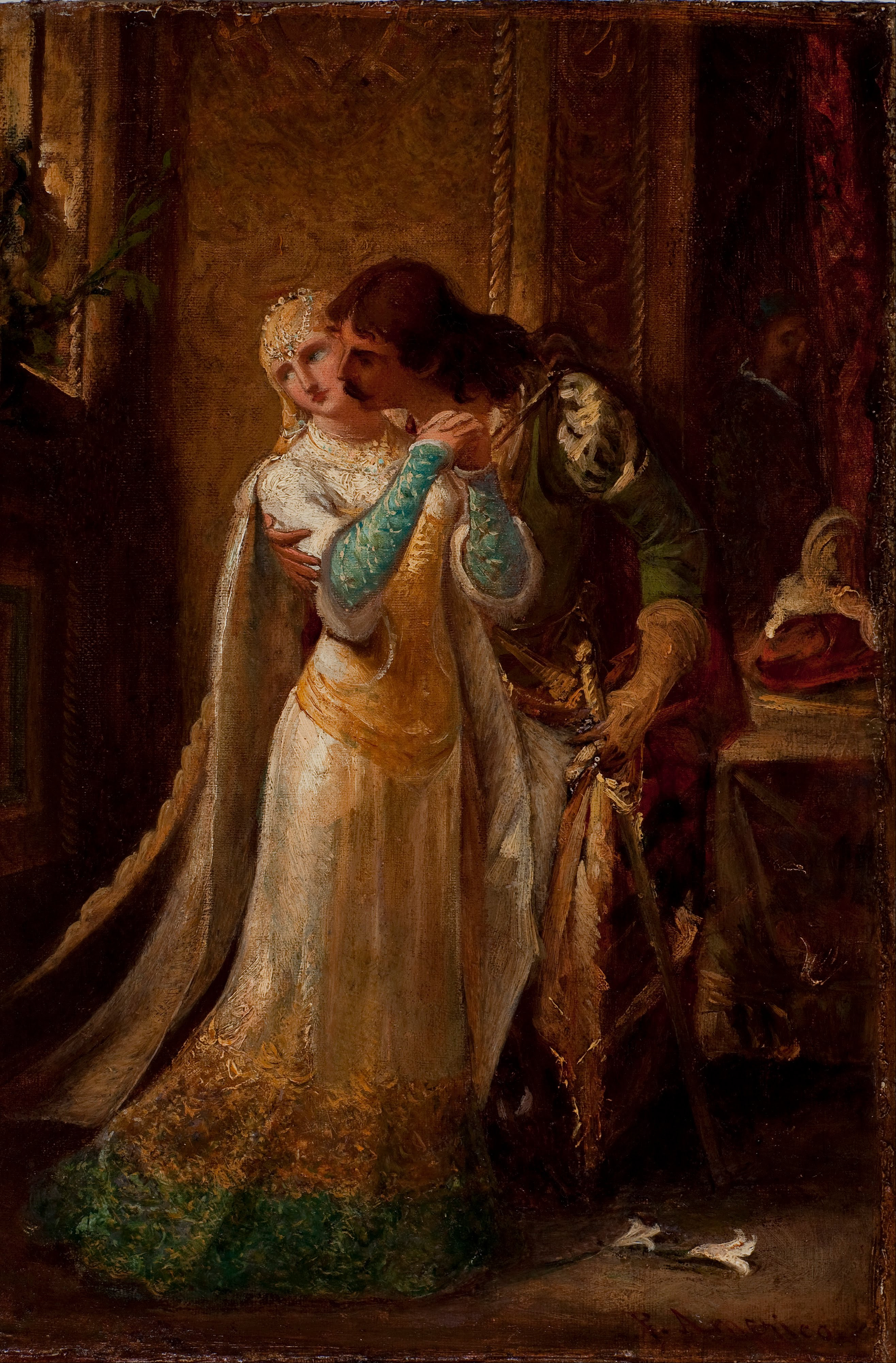
Fausto e Margarida

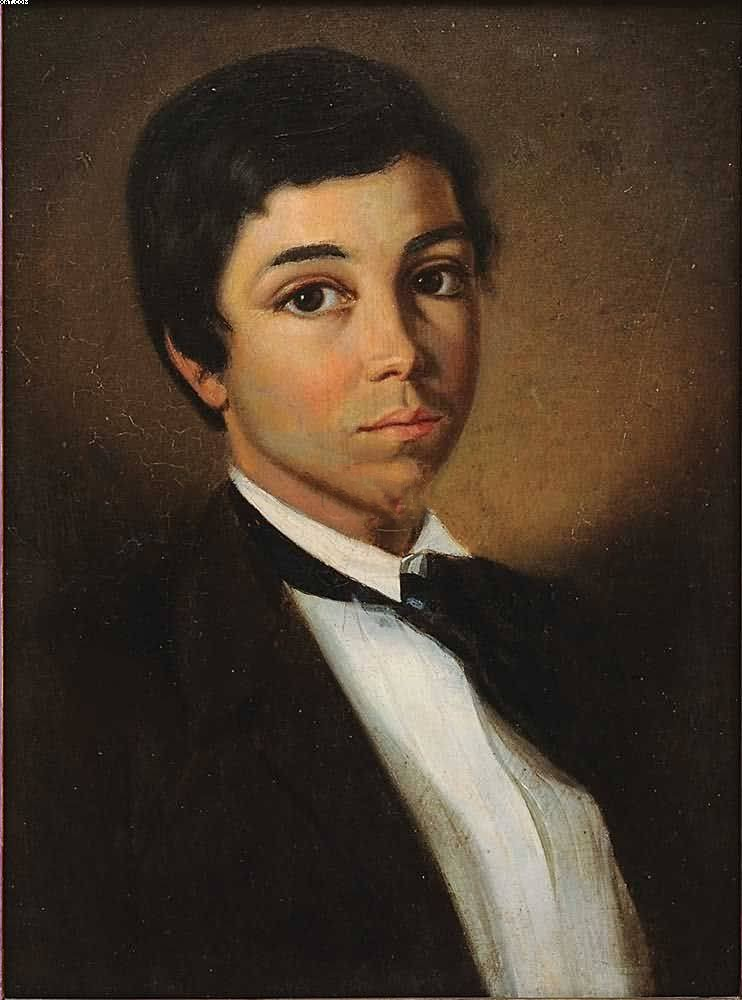
Auto-retrato aos onze anos

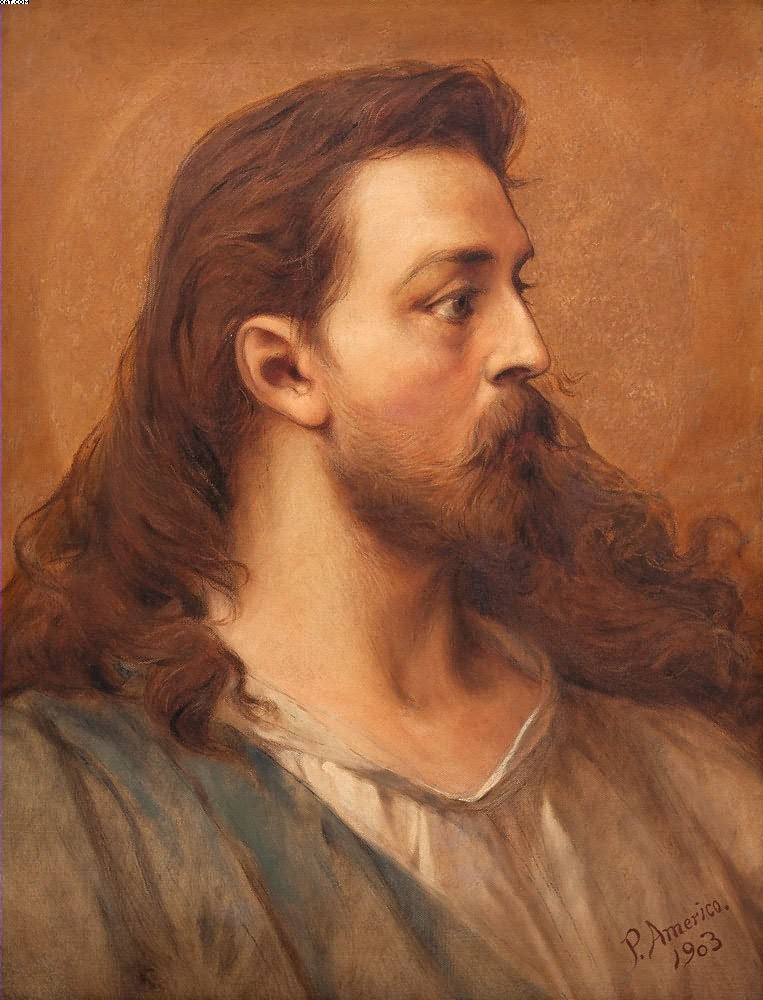
Cristo

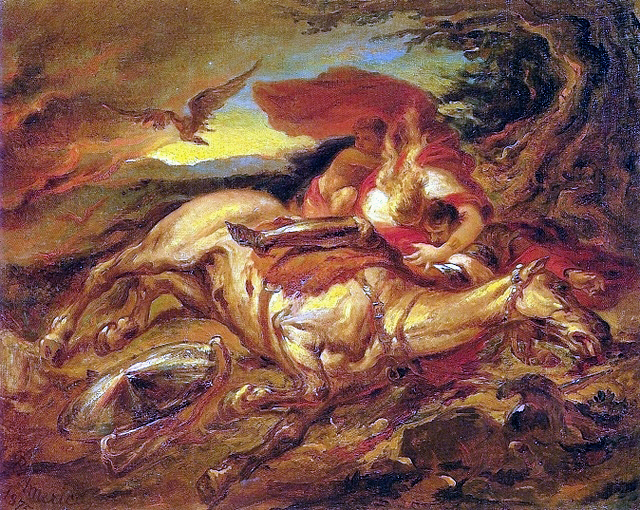
Cavalo Morto

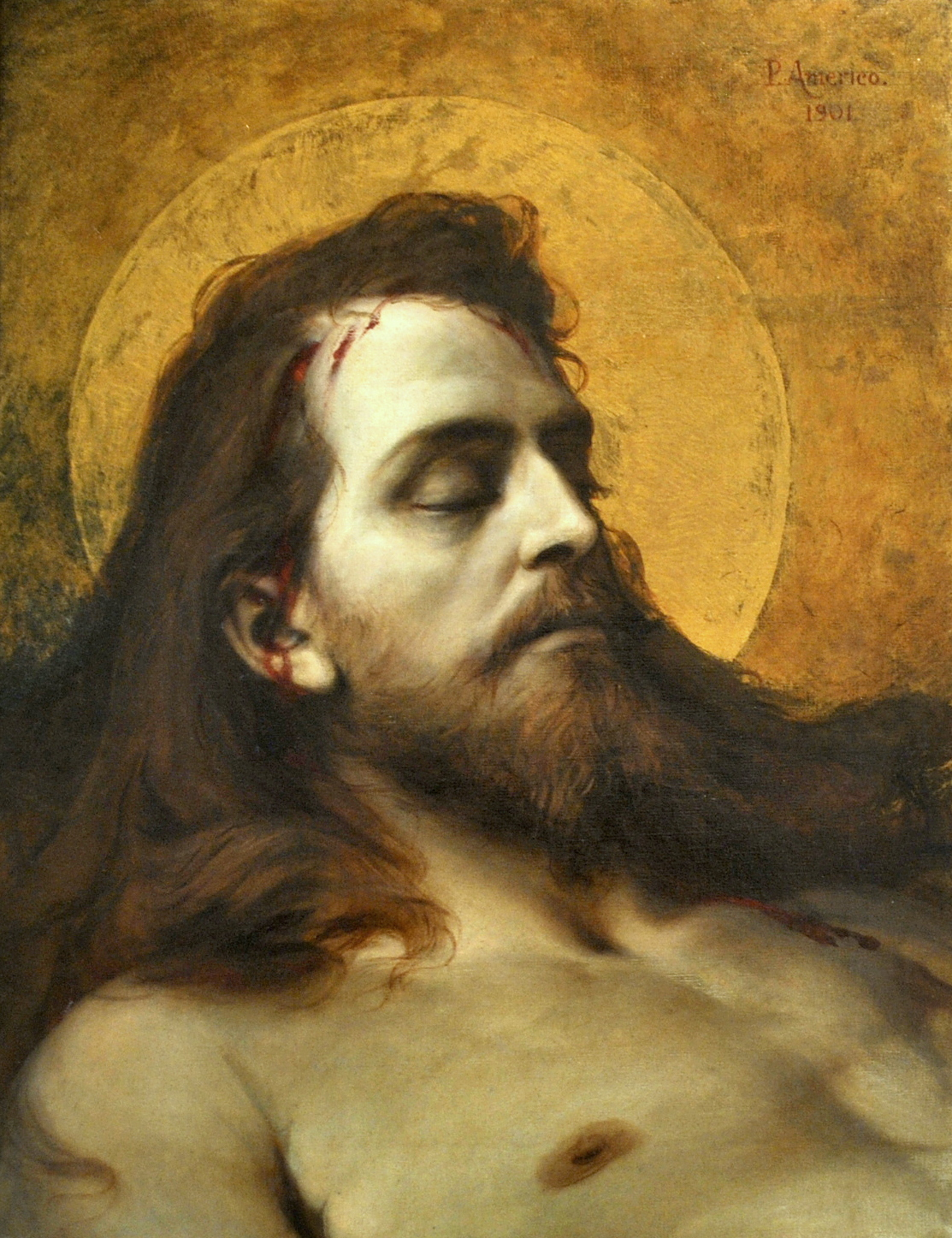
Cristo Morto

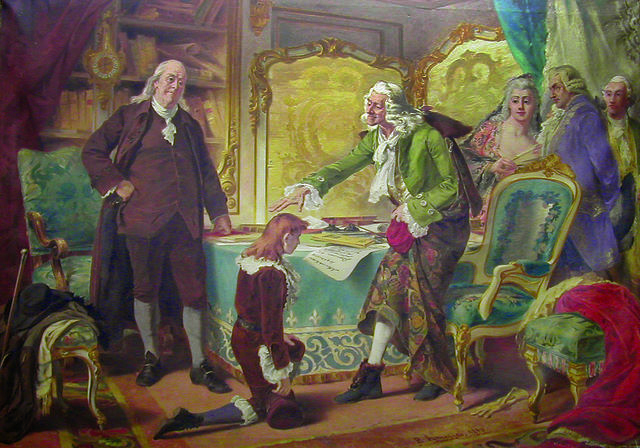
Voltaire abençoando o neto de Franklin em nome de Deus e da Liberdade

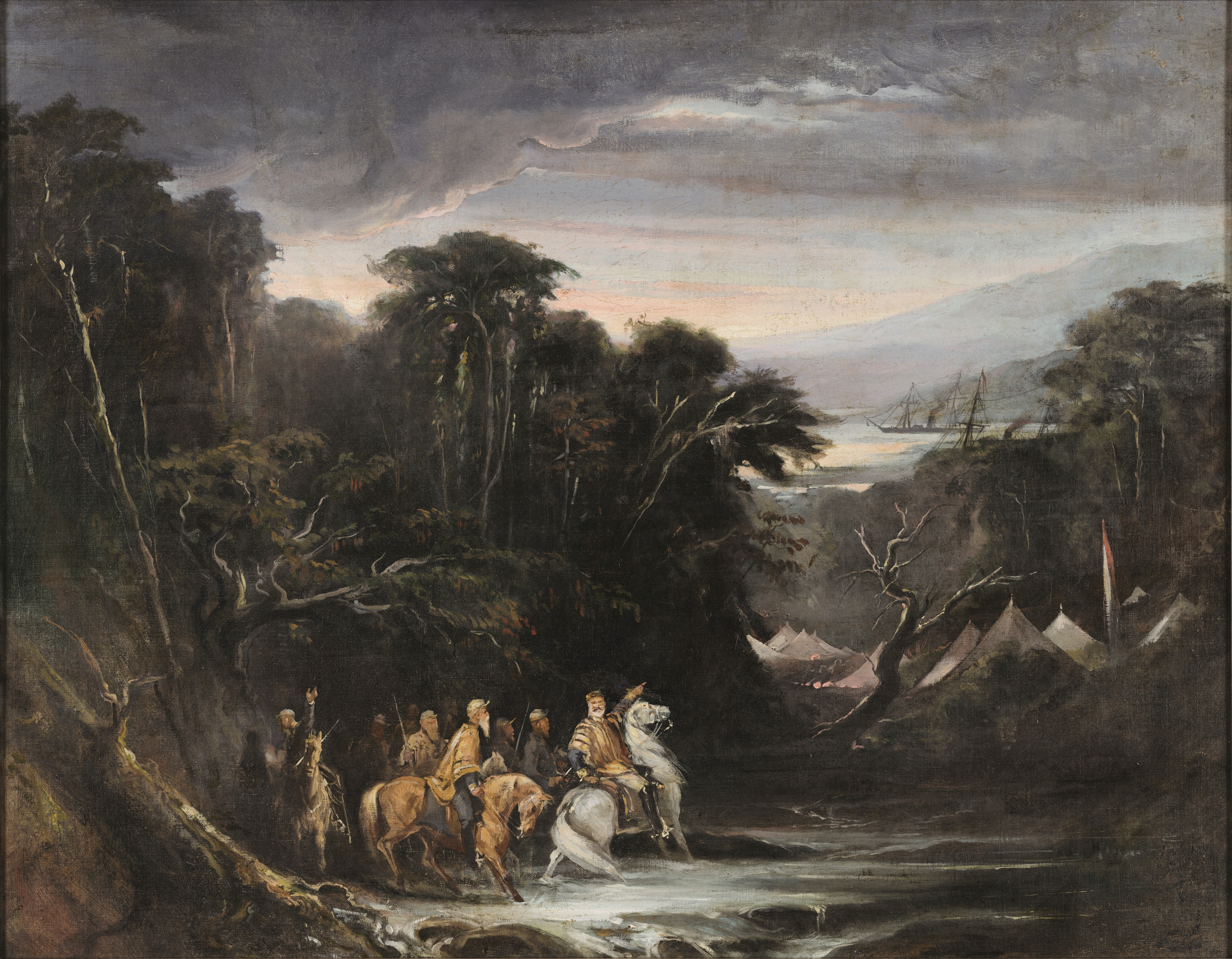
Estudo para Passagem do Chaco

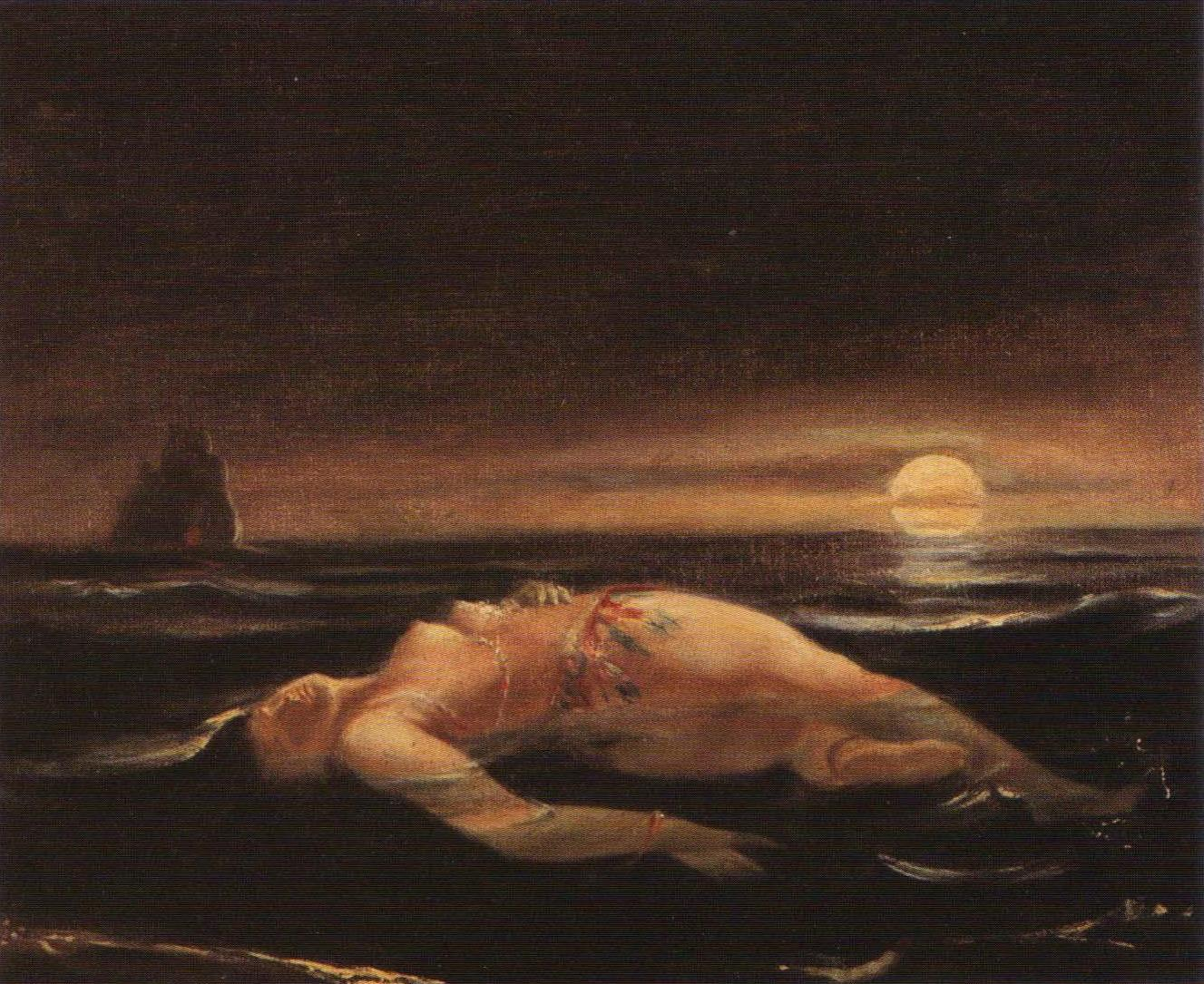
Moema

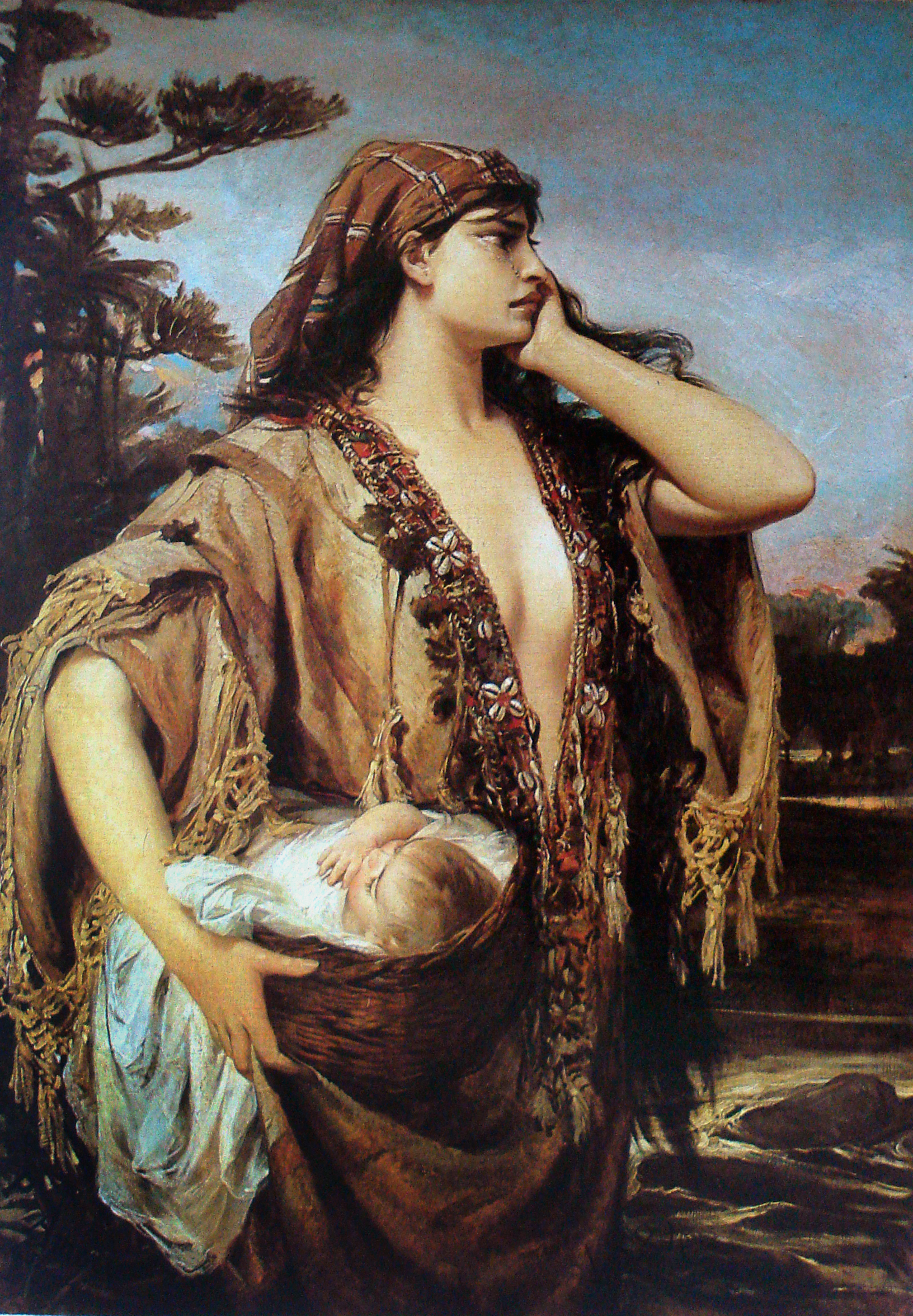
Jocabed levando Moisés até o Nilo

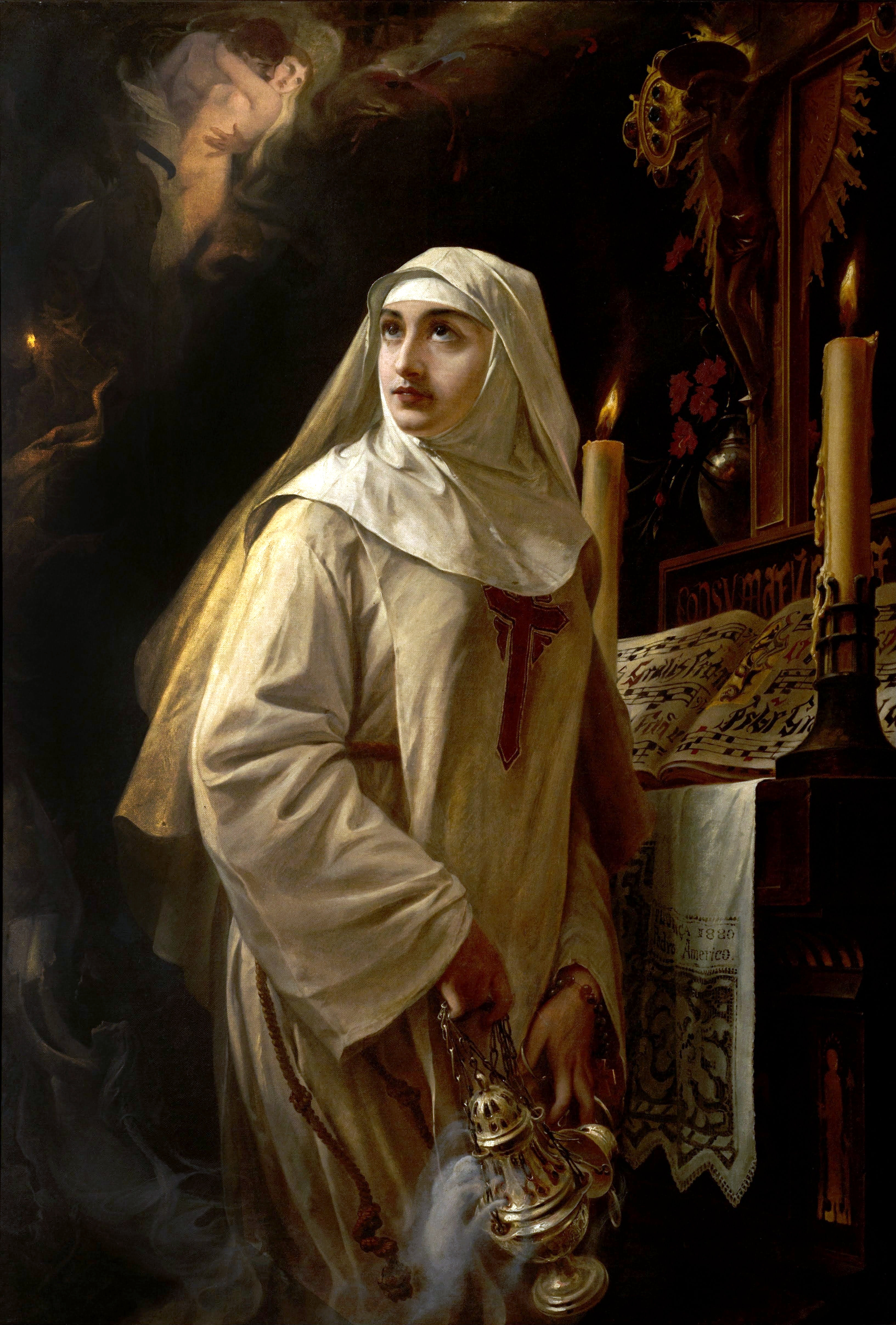
O Voto de Heloísa

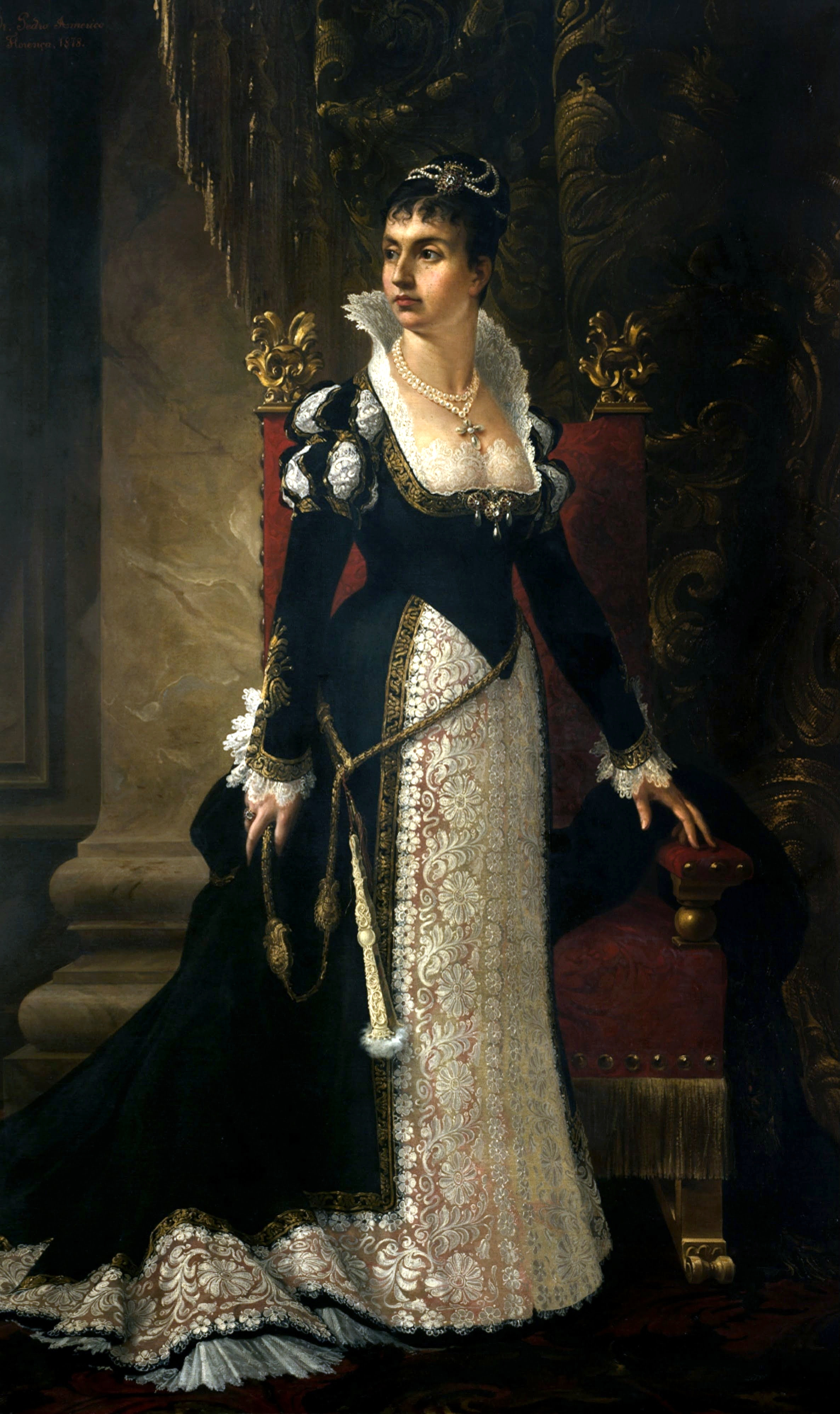
Dona Catarina de Ataíde
