= Adolphe Ganot =

French writer and publisher of physics textbooks

Adolphe Ganot (born 1804 in Rochefort, Charente-Maritime, France; died 1887 in Paris) was a French writer and publisher of physics textbooks. Ganot's textbooks, written during the second half of the nineteenth century, made "...a decisive contribution to physics and its teaching on an international scale". His popular Treatise on Physics (French: Traité de Physique) was translated into several languages.
