= Dutch invasions of Brazil =

Dutch occupation of Brazil in the 17th century

- Part of the Dutch–Portuguese War
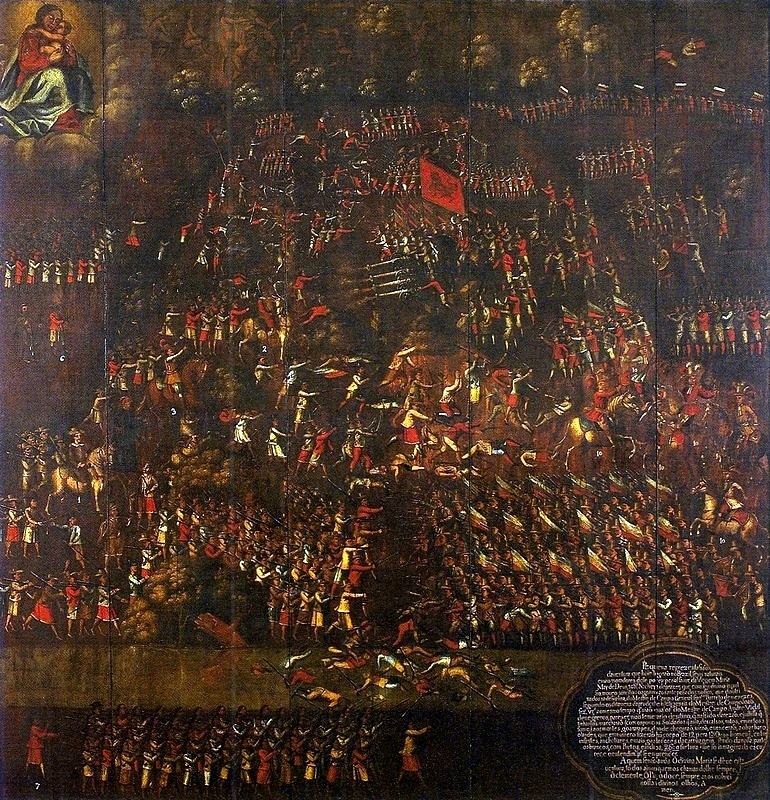
- The Battle of Guararapes
Date	1624–1654
Location	Northeastern Brazil
Result	Portuguese victory

Belligerents
Portugal (Note: In personal union with Spain from 1580 to 1640. See also Personal Union); State of Brazil	Dutch Republic; West India Company

Commanders and leaders
Mendonça Furtado (POW); Francisco Padilha; Fernando de Mascarenhas; Matias de Albuquerque; Salvador de Sá; Francisco de Meneses; André Vidal de Negreiros; Henrique Dias; Antônio Filipe Camarão; João F. Vieira; António Teles de Meneses; Martim Soares Moreno; Fadrique de Toledo	John Maurice of Nassau; Johan van Dorth †; Jacob Willekens; Piet Hein; Jan Lichthart; Krzysztof Arciszewski; Diederick van Waerdenburgh; van Schoppe (WIA); Hendrick Lonck; Hendrik van Haus †; Jan Blaer (executed)

Olinda, then the richest city in colonial Brazil, was sacked and destroyed by the Dutch, who chose Recife as the capital of New Holland. Nicolaes Visscher's map shows the siege of Olinda and Recife in 1630.

The Dutch invasions in Brazil were a series of military campaigns carried out by the Dutch West India Company (WIC) during the 17th century. Considered the biggest political-military conflict in the colony, the invasions were centered on the control of sugar and slave supply sources. Although they were concentrated in Northeastern Brazil, they were not just a regional episode. There were two interconnected, albeit distant, fronts: Brazil and Africa.

The resistance was characterized by a financial and military effort based on local and external resources. The funds raised in the colony accounted for two thirds of the expenditure between 1630 and 1637, with mostly European troops, and almost all of the expenditure between 1644 and 1654, with soldiers mainly from Pernambuco.

On 26 January 1654, the Dutch surrendered and signed the capitulation, after the tide turned against the Dutch when they suffered a significant defeat at the Second Battle of Guararapes in 1649, acknowledging the Portuguese as the stronger military presence in Brazil.

== History ==
=== Background ===
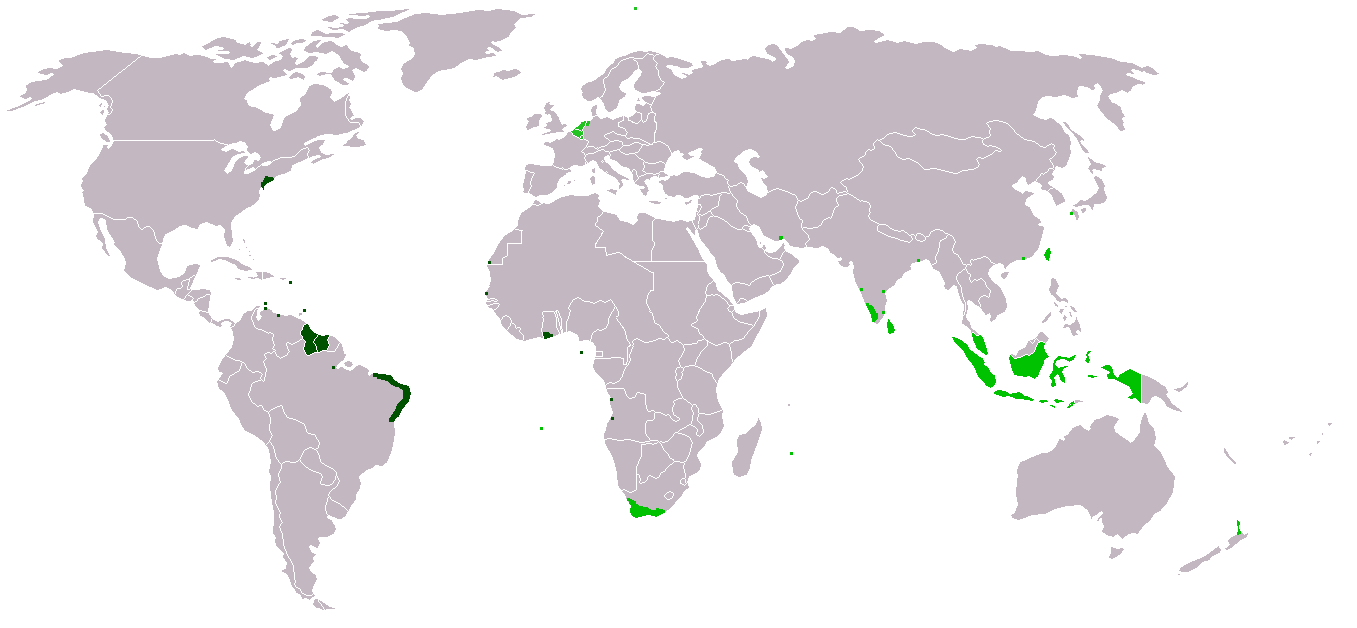
Dutch colonial empire with the possessions of the Dutch West India Company marked in dark green.

The conflict began during the Philippine Dynasty, known in Brazil as the Iberian Union, a period between 1580 and 1640 when Portugal and its colonies were under the rule of the Spanish Crown.

At the time, the Dutch were fighting for their independence from Spanish rule. Although some provinces proclaimed their independence in 1581, the Republic of the Seven United Provinces, with their capital Amsterdam, only had its independence recognized in 1648, after the peace agreement of Münster.

During the conflict, one of the measures adopted by Philip II was the prohibition of Spanish trade with Dutch ports, which directly affected the Brazilian sugar business, since they were traditional investors in sugar agro-manufacturing.

Faced with this restriction, the Dutch focused on trade in the Indian Ocean and, in 1602, set up the Dutch East India Company, which had a monopoly on eastern commerce, assuring the company's profitability.

The success of this project led to the founding of the Dutch West India Company in 1621, which was responsible for the monopoly of the slave trade for twenty-four years in the Americas and Africa. However, the new firm's main objective was to take over the commerce in sugar produced in the Northeast of Brazil.

==== Capture of Recife ====
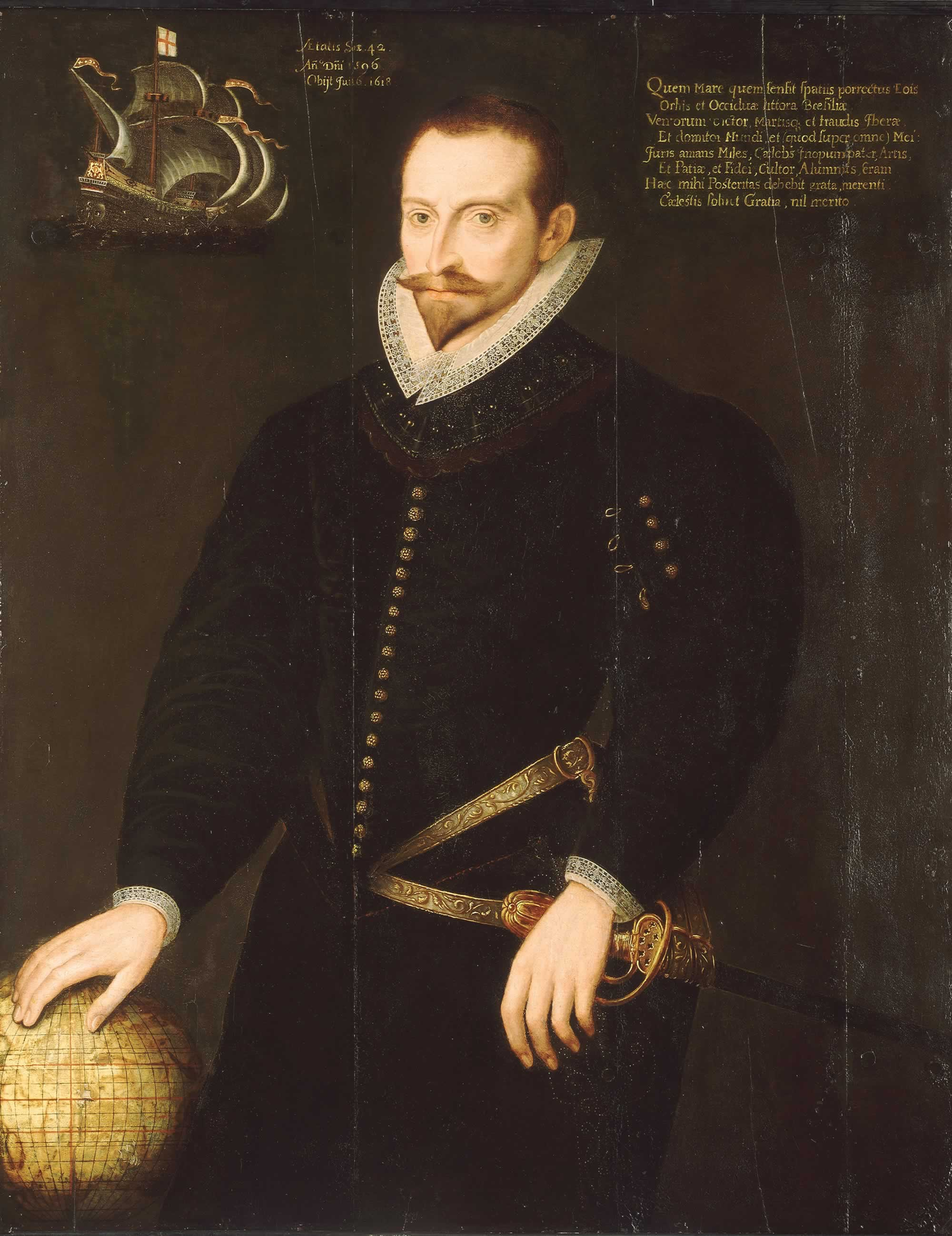
The English privateer James Lancaster seized the richest treasure in the history of Elizabethan English privateering in Recife with Dutch help during the Anglo-Spanish War.

Flag of Dutch Brazil.

The Capture of Recife, also known as Lancaster's Pernambucan expedition, was an episode in the Anglo-Spanish War that took place in 1595 in the port of Recife, Pernambuco. Led by the English admiral James Lancaster, it was the only British expedition whose main target was Brazil. It represented the richest heist in the history of shipping in the Elizabethan era.

The Iberian Union placed Brazil in conflict with European nations that were friendly to Portugal but enemies of Spain, such as England and the Netherlands. The Captaincy of Pernambuco, the richest of all Portuguese territories, became a target for conquest.

In 1588, a few years after defeating the Spanish Armada, the English had access to Portuguese and Spanish manuscripts detailing the coast of Brazil. One of them, written by the Portuguese merchant Lopes Vaz, emphasized the qualities of the wealthy town of Olinda by saying that "Pernambuco is the most important city on the entire coast". The opulence of Pernambuco had impressed Father Fernão Cardim, who was surprised by "the larger and richer estates than those of Bahia, the banquets of extraordinary delicacies, the beds of crimson damask, fringed with gold and the rich Indian quilts", and summed up his impressions in an anthological phrase: "Finally, in Pernambuco one finds more vanity than in Lisbon". Soon the captaincy would be seen by the English as a "soft and succulent" piece of Philip II's Empire.

James Lancaster's expedition left Blackwall in October 1594 and sailed across the Atlantic capturing numerous ships before reaching Pernambuco. When he arrived, Lancaster confronted the local resistance, but was met at the entrance to the port by three Dutch hulks, from which he expected a negative reaction, which didn't happen: the previously peaceful Dutch raised anchor and left the way clear for the English invasion. As well as not resisting the action, they eventually joined forces with the English, hiring their ships to transport the assets stolen in Pernambuco. Lancaster took Recife and remained there for almost a month. During this time, he joined up with the French who had arrived in the port and defeated a series of Portuguese counter-attacks. The fleet left with a hefty amount of sugar, brazilwood, cotton and high-priced products; only one small ship didn't reach its destination. The profit for the investors, including Thomas Cordell, then mayor of London, and John Wattas, a city councilor, was estimated at more than 51,000 pounds sterling. Of the total, £6,100 stayed with Lancaster and £3,050 went to the Queen. With such an achievement, the expedition was considered an absolute military and financial success.

After Lancaster's visit, the Captaincy of Pernambuco organized two armed companies to defend the region, each with 220 musketeers and arquebusiers, one based in Olinda and the other in Recife. Years later, the then governor Matias de Albuquerque sought to establish fortified positions in the port of Recife.

==== Olivier van Noort's expedition ====
According to some authors, while passing along the coast of Brazil, Admiral Olivier van Noort, leading his expedition, attempted an invasion of Guanabara Bay. His fleet left Rotterdam, in the Netherlands, on September 13, 1598, consisting of four ships and 248 men.

With the crew sick with scurvy, the fleet asked for permission to obtain fresh supplies in Guanabara Bay, which was denied by the captaincy's government, in accordance with instructions received from the Portuguese Crown. An attempt to disembark was repelled by indigenous people and the artillery of the Fortress of Santa Cruz da Barra.

Reports say that the expedition pillaged and burned cities and ships off the coasts of Chile, Peru and the Philippines. However, it suffered heavy losses in an attack by the indigenous people of Patagonia (now Chile) and the Spanish forces in Peru. Some authors believe that van Noort discovered Antarctica on this voyage. The expedition returned to port on August 26, 1601, with only one ship, manned by 45 survivors.

==== Joris van Spielbergen's expedition ====
A similar incident occurred with the expedition of Admiral Joris van Spielbergen, who was making the second Dutch circumnavigation voyage between 1614 and 1618. In 1615, his ships docked at Cabo Frio, Ilha Grande and São Vicente, facing Portuguese resistance when trying to resupply.

In the 1648 edition of Miroir Oost & West-Indical (originally published in Amsterdam in 1621 by Ian Ianst), Spielbergen's narrative is illustrated by an engraving of São Vicente, which portrays the incident in Santos. Despite its inaccuracies, this iconography describes the contours of the bay, the rivers, the forts and the houses.

==== Dutch Amazon ====
In the vicinity of Almeirim (formerly Aldeia de Paru), the Dutch, accompanied by some Englishmen and led by Pieter Ita, made an attempt to settle with the construction of the Morro da Velha Pobre Fort in 1623. They were repelled by the Portuguese incursion headed by Bento Maciel Parente, who expelled them back to Zeeland, in the Netherlands. The Dutch fort was destroyed.

=== Periodization ===
Overall, the Dutch invasions in Brazil can be divided into two main periods:

- 1624-1625 - Invasion of Salvador, Bahia;
- 1630-1654 - Invasion of Olinda and Recife, in Pernambuco:
  - 1630-1637 - Resistance to the invader;
  - 1637-1644 - Administration of Maurice of Nassau;
  - 1644-1654 - Insurrection of Pernambuco.

==== Invasion of Salvador (1624-1625) ====
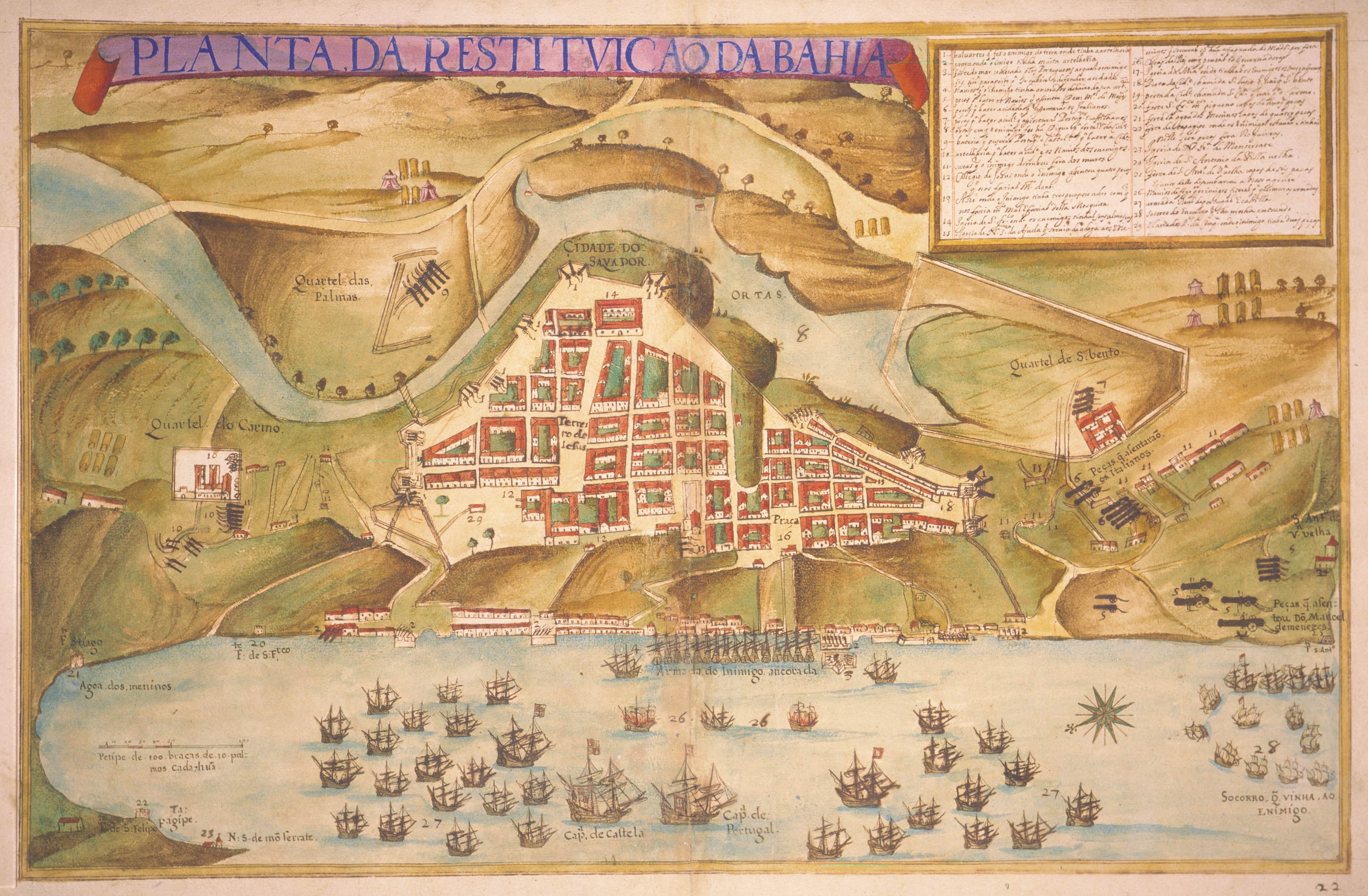
Map showing the recapture of Bahia from the Dutch (João Teixeira Albernaz, the Elder, 1631): in the foreground, the Spanish Armada.

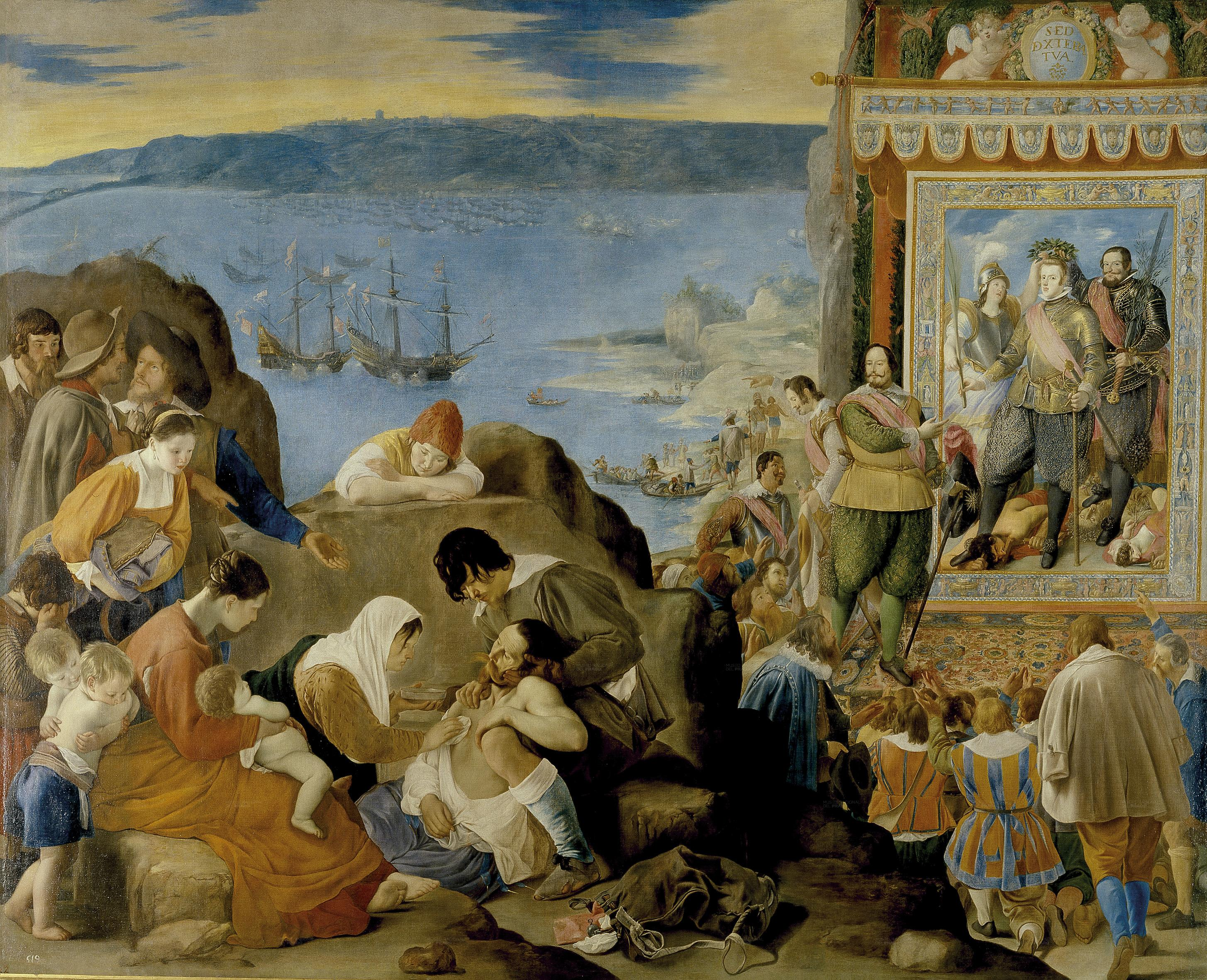
A painting depicting the reconquest of Salvador by Spanish and Portuguese troops (1635).

Aware of the vulnerability of the Portuguese settlements on the northeast coast of Brazil, the administrators of the Dutch West India Company (WIC) decided to attack the city of Salvador, then the capital of Brazil, in the Captaincy of Bahia.

On May 10, 1624, a WIC expedition with twenty-six ships carrying around 1,700 men under the command of Admiral Jacob Willekens attacked and conquered the city. Terrified, the inhabitants retreated inland. The governor-general, Diogo de Mendonça Furtado, tried to hide in the palace, but he, his son and some officers were imprisoned and sent to the Netherlands. The Dutch nobleman Johan van Dorth took over the administration of the city. The governor of the Captaincy of Pernambuco, Matias de Albuquerque, was appointed governor-general and began to administer the colony from Olinda and send significant reinforcements to the resistance based in Arraial do Rio Vermelho and Recôncavo.

In 1625, Spain sent a powerful brigade of fifty-two ships with around twelve thousand men as reinforcements, under the command of Fadrique de Toledo Osório, Marquis of Villanueva de Valduesa, and Manuel de Meneses, general of the navy on the coast of Portugal. This expedition, which became known as the Recapture of Bahia, defeated and expelled the Dutch invaders on May 1 of that same year.

The huge cost of the invasion of the lands of Bahia was recovered four years later in an act in the Caribbean Sea, when Admiral Piet Heyn, in the service of the WIC, intercepted and sacked the Spanish fleet that was carrying the annual shipment of silver mined from the American colonies.

==== Invasion of Olinda and Recife (1630-1654) ====
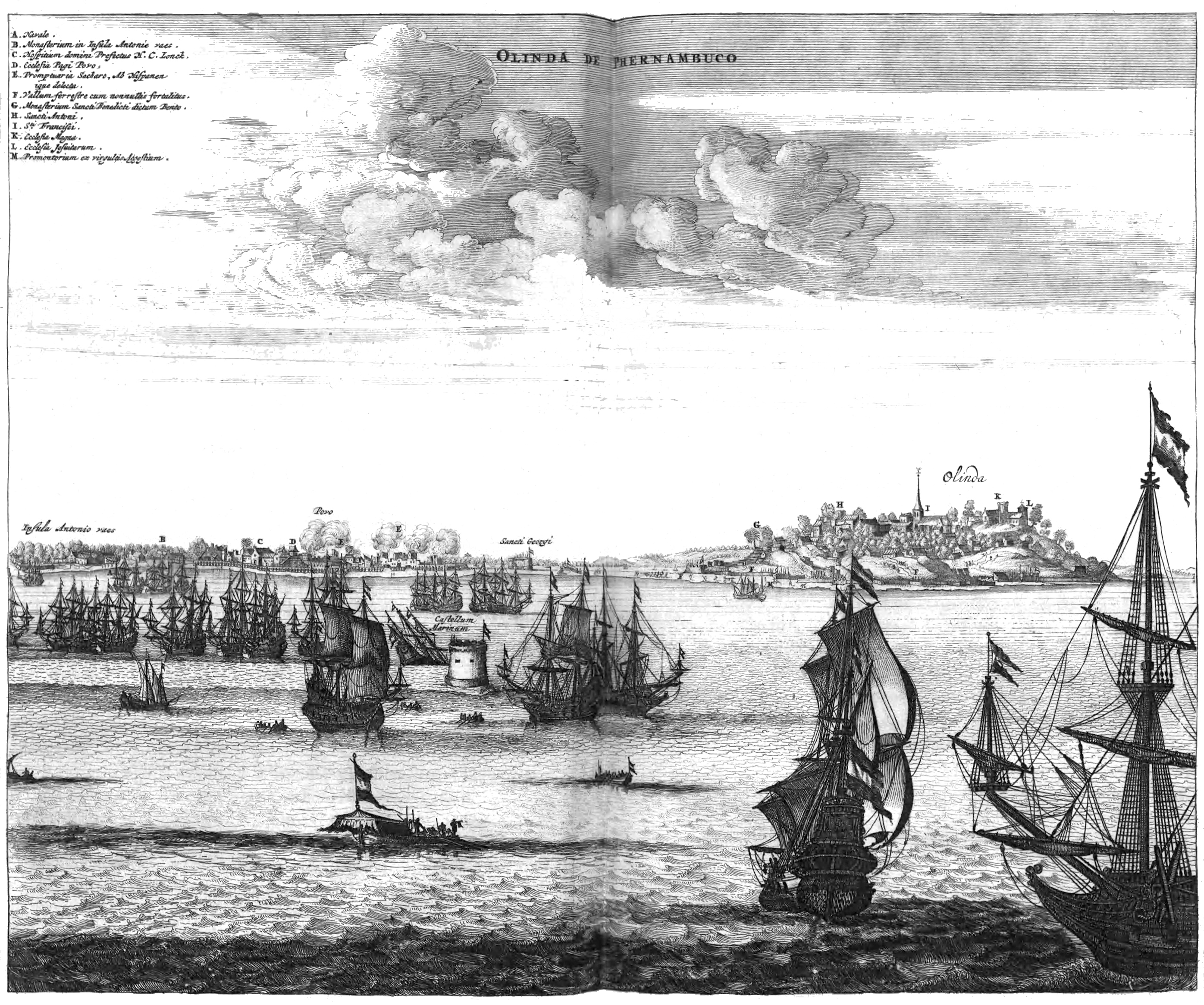
Siege of Olinda and Recife.

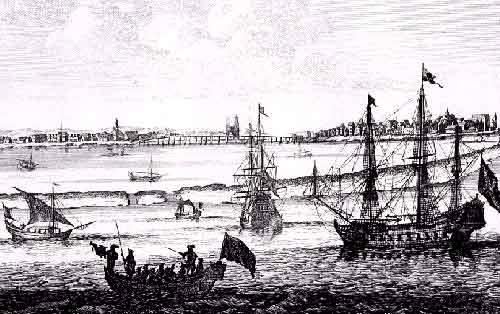
View of Mauritsstad (Recife) in 1645.

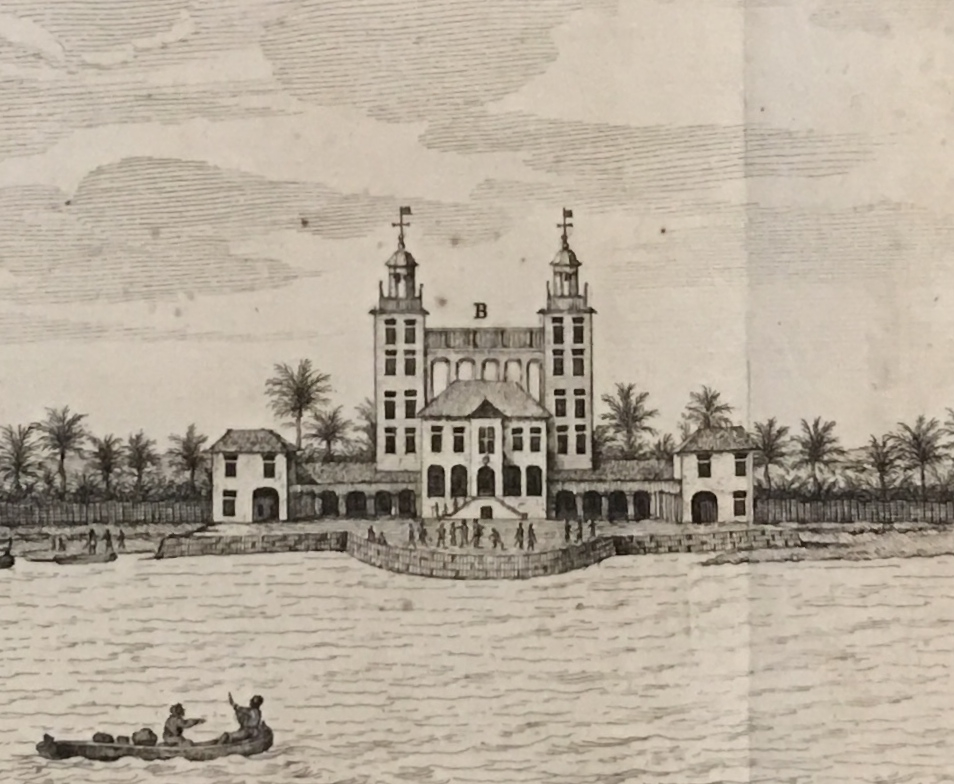
Recife was the most cosmopolitan city in America during Nassau's rule. In the picture, the Palace of Fribourg, demolished in the 18th century.

In possession of the resources obtained from the sacking of the silver fleet, the Dutch launched a new expedition. Their declared aim was to restore the sugar trade with the Netherlands, which had been banned by the Spanish Crown. A new squadron of sixty-seven ships and around seven thousand men - the largest ever seen in the colony - under the command of Admiral Hendrick Lonck, invaded Pernambuco and, in February 1630, conquered Olinda and then captured Recife in March. With the victory, the invaders were strengthened by an additional 6,000 men sent from Europe to secure the conquest.

The acquisition of slave workforce became essential for the success of Dutch colonization. As a result, the WIC began trafficking slaves from Africa to Brazil.

==== Resistance ====
The resistance, led by Matias de Albuquerque, was concentrated in Arraial do Bom Jesus, on the outskirts of Recife. Using indigenous combat tactics, such as guerrilla warfare, they confined the invaders inside the fortifications on the urban perimeter of Olinda and its port, Recife.

The so-called "ambush tactics" were small groups of ten to forty highly mobile men who attacked the Dutch by surprise and then retreated at speed, regrouping for new battles.

However, over time, some sugar cane plantation owners accepted the administration of the West India Company because they believed that an injection of capital and a more liberal administration would help their businesses develop. Their best representative was Domingos Fernandes Calabar, historiographically considered a traitor for supporting the occupying forces and the Dutch administration.

Military leaders such as Martim Soares Moreno, Filipe Camarão, Henrique Dias and Francisco Rebelo (also known as Rebelinho) stood out during this phase of Luso-Brazilian resistance.

With the invasion of Paraíba in 1634, and the conquests of Arraial do Bom Jesus and Cabo de Santo Agostinho in 1635, the forces commanded by Matias de Albuquerque collapsed and were forced to retreat towards the São Francisco river. Important figures in this context were Calabar and Colonel Krzysztof Arciszewski.

==== Administration of Maurice of Nassau ====
Once the Luso-Brazilian resistance had been overcome, with the help of Calabar, the WIC appointed Count Maurice of Nassau to administer the land. A cultured and liberal man, Nassau accepted the immigration of Jews and Protestants, who supported him against the Kingdom of Portugal in its conquest of Brazilian territory, and brought with him artists and scientists to study the potential of the territory. He was concerned with the recovery of the sugar industry, which had been damaged by the battles, granting credits and selling the conquered sugar mills at public auction. He also took care of supply, labor and administration issues and promoted extensive urban reform in Recife (Mauritsstad). He granted religious freedom; under his government, the first synagogue on the American continent was founded in Recife.

In November 1640, a WIC expedition led by Jan Cornelisz Lichthart and Hans Koin occupied the island of São Luís. Portuguese settlers and Jesuit missionaries established themselves in Tapuitapera. The main leader of the resistance was Antônio Muniz Barreiros. In 1643, reinforcements arrived from Pará, led by João Vale do Velho and Bento Maciel Parente. The battles to expel the invaders lasted until February 28, 1644.

On December 1, 1640, Portugal separated from Spain, which made it possible to form an alliance with England to fight the Netherlands.

==== Insurrection of Pernambuco ====
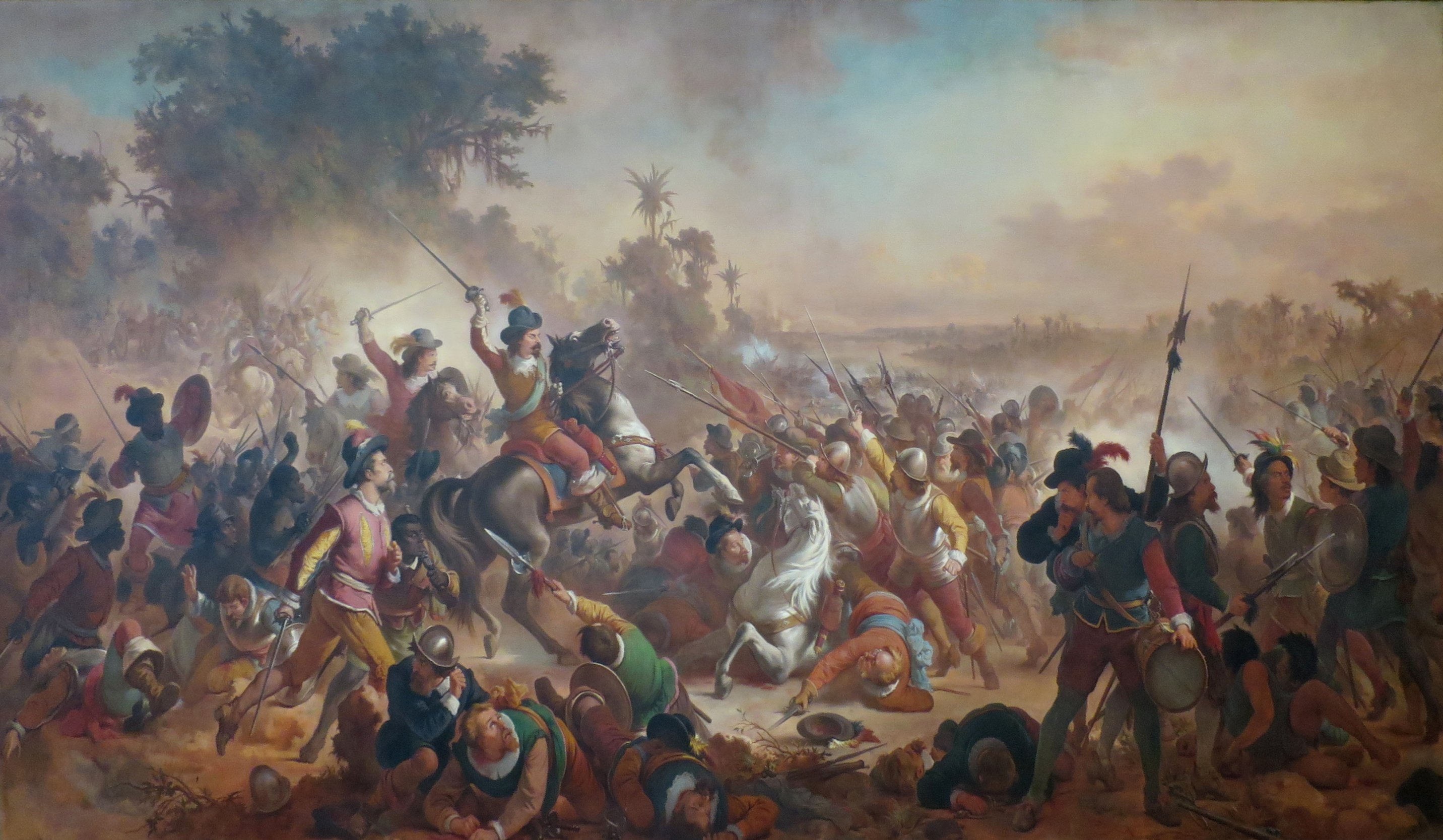
The Battles of Guararapes, decisive episodes in the Insurrection of Pernambuco, are considered to be the origin of the Brazilian Army.

In the Insurrection of Pernambuco (also known as the War of Divine Light), the movement that expelled the Dutch from Brazil was led by the plantation owners André Vidal de Negreiros and João Fernandes Vieira, the Afro-descendant Henrique Dias and the native Filipe Camarão.

The Restoration of Portuguese Independence in 1640 led to the signing of a ten-year truce between Portugal and the Netherlands. Faced with this setback to Spanish rule, the Dutch war of independence continued.

In America, Brazil spoke out in favor of John IV. In the Northeast, under WIC domination, Maurice of Nassau was replaced in the administration. Contrary to what he had advocated in his political "testament", the company's new managers began to demand the liquidation of debts owed to defaulting plantation owners, a policy that led to the Insurrection of Pernambuco in 1645 and culminated in the extinction of Dutch rule after the second Battle of Guararapes.

Formally, the surrender was signed on January 26, 1654, in the Taborda Hill, but it only became fully effective on August 6, 1661, with the signing of the Treaty of The Hague, in which Portugal agreed to compensate the Netherlands with two colonies, Ceylon (now Sri Lanka) and the Maluku Islands (part of present-day Indonesia), and eight million guilders, equivalent to sixty-three tons of gold, paid in installments over forty years under the threat of invasion by the Navy. According to a traditional historiographical current in the military history of Brazil, the movement also marked the germ of Brazilian nationalism, as whites, Africans and indigenous people merged their interests in expelling the invader.

==== The Dutch surrender ====
The Dutch surrender in Brazil, better known as the Capitulação do Campo do Taborda, was signed on January 26, 1654, and established the terms and clauses that sought to resolve the existing conditions of the Dutch in Brazilian lands, especially those related to the abdication of land and possessions. It also addressed marriages between Dutchmen and Brazilian or Portuguese women and their different properties. Through this treaty, the Dutch committed to delivering not only Recife and Mauritsstad (today Antônio Vaz Island), but also the forts they still occupied on Itamaracá Island, Paraíba, Rio Grande do Norte and Ceará.

=== Consequences ===
Today's Sri Lanka, an Asian country, was one of the territories ceded by Portugal to the Netherlands in order to prevent another attempt to invade Pernambuco.

As a result of the invasions of the Northeast of Brazil, Dutch power became dominant in all stages of sugar production, from planting to refining and distribution. With control of the market for African slaves, it began to invest in the Antilles region. The sugar produced in this region had a lower production cost due to the tax exemption on labor ( tributed by the Portuguese Crown) and the lower price of transport. With difficulties in acquiring labor and without mastering the refining and distribution process and capital to invest, Portuguese sugar was unable to compete on the international market, immersing Brazil's economy (and Portugal's) in a crisis that would last through the second half of the 17th century until the discovery of gold in Minas Gerais.

Due to the First Anglo-Dutch War, the Dutch Republic was unable to help the WIC in Brazil. With the end of the conflict with the English, the Netherlands demanded the return of the colony in May 1654. Under threat of a new invasion of northeastern Brazil and Dutch fleets which blockaded the Portuguese coast and brought maritime trade to a standstill, Portugal signed an agreement with the Dutch and compensated them with eight million guilders and the colonies of Ceylon (now Sri Lanka) and the Maluku Islands (part of present-day Indonesia). On August 6, 1661, the Netherlands formally ceded the region to the Portuguese Empire through the Treaty of The Hague.

== Genetic inheritance ==
According to a genetic study carried out by the Federal University of Minas Gerais in 2000, 19% of the northeastern Brazilians surveyed had a genetic marker of the Y chromosome (haplogroup 2), which is common in Europe. Since this haplogroup is more common in northeastern Brazil (19%) than in Portugal (13%), the researchers hypothesized that this "excess" could be due to the genetic influence of the Dutch colonizers who came to the region in the 17th century. Something similar occurs in southern Brazil, where there has been a lot of immigration from northern Europe and an excess of haplogroup 2 (28%) compared to Portugal.

However, it is unknown how many Dutch lived in Brazil or how many remained after the Portuguese retook the territory. Historical records show that the Portuguese were the only registered and significant source of European immigrants in Brazil until 1808, when the ports were opened. Only after that date were non-Portuguese immigrants allowed to enter Brazil more freely.

== See also ==
- Dutch Brazil
- Dutch–Portuguese War
- Dutch Brazilians
- Military history of Brazil
