= Capture of Bahia =

1624 military conflict

Capture of Salvador
- Part of the Dutch invasions of Brazil
- Attack on San Salvador (c. 1624), oil painting by Andries van Eertvelt (1590–1652)
Date	8 May 1624
Location	Salvador, present-day Brazil
Result	Dutch victory

Belligerents
Dutch Republic: WIC	Portugal

Commanders and leaders
(Dutch West India Company) Jacob Willekens; (Dutch West India Company) Pieter Heyn; (Dutch West India Company) Johan van Dorth	(Kingdom of Portugal) Mendonça Furtado

Strength
6,500	3,000

Casualties and losses
50 killed or wounded	Unknown

The capture of Salvador was a military engagement between Portugal (at that time, united with Spain in the Iberian Union) and the Dutch West India Company, that occurred in 1624, and ended in the capture of the Brazilian city of Salvador by the latter. This capture was part of the Groot Desseyn plan of the Dutch West India Company. Although the Dutch intentions were reported to the Spanish, no preventive counter-action was taken until the Recapture of Bahia in 1625.

== Prelude ==
On 22 December 1623, a Dutch fleet under the command of Admiral Jacob Willekens and Vice Admiral Pieter Heyn and consisting of 35 ships sailed from Texel carrying 6,500 men. Thirteen were owned by the United Provinces, while the rest belonged to the WIC; these vessels were en route to Cape Verde, where they arrived after being scattered by a storm. There Willekens revealed his objective of capturing the city of Salvador. The Dutch plans to invade Brazil were soon reported by Spanish spies in the Netherlands to the court of Madrid, but Count-Duke of Olivares did not give them credit.

On 8 May the Dutch fleet appeared off Salvador. The main objective of the expedition was the capture of the port to use it as a commercial base to ensure Dutch trade with the East Indies. In addition, they would control much of the sugar production in the region, as Salvador was a major center for the product.

The Portuguese governor of Salvador, Diogo de Mendonça Furtado, tried to organize the defense of the town with 3,000 men who had been hastily recruited as a mostly Portuguese militia from peasant levees and black slaves, all of them resentful of Spanish rule. The port was protected by the sea and two forts: Fort Santo Antônio in the east and Fort São Filipe in the west. Additionally, a six-gun battery was erected on the beach and the streets were barricaded.

== Capture ==
The Dutch fleet entered the bay divided into two squadrons. One sailed towards the beach of Santo António and disembarked soldiers commanded by Colonel Johan van Dorth. The other anchored off the town and opened fire on the coastal defenses, which were quickly neutralized. At dawn the city was surrounded by more than 1,000 Dutch soldiers with two pieces of artillery. Intimidated, the Portuguese militia threw their weapons away and fled, leaving Mendonça with 60 loyal soldiers. Salvador had been captured at a cost of 50 casualties among the attackers.

Willekens and Heyn installed a garrison under the command of Dorth before departing on new missions, according to the orders they had received. Four ships were sent back to Holland carrying booty and news, and also instructions to call for reinforcements to secure Salvador. The defenses of the city were reinforced and expanded with moats and ramparts and the garrison was soon increased to 2,500 men with numerous Portuguese slaves seduced by promises of freedom and land.

== Aftermath ==
However, the Dutch garrison soon began to be harassed by the local guerrillas, led by Bishop Dom Marcos Teixeira, who had escaped inland. He managed to assemble a force of 1,400 Portuguese and 250 Indian auxiliaries. They built fortifications and organized ambushes against the Dutch in woodland. Dorth himself was killed in an attempt to drive off the attackers from the outskirts and morale sagged. He was replaced by Albert Schoutens, who also perished in another ambush, being replaced by his brother Willem.

A Spanish-led expedition would recapture the post from the Dutch the next year.
