= Action of 12–17 January 1640 =

1640 naval battle

Coordinates: 7.747°S 34.813°W

- Part of the Dutch invasions of Brazil
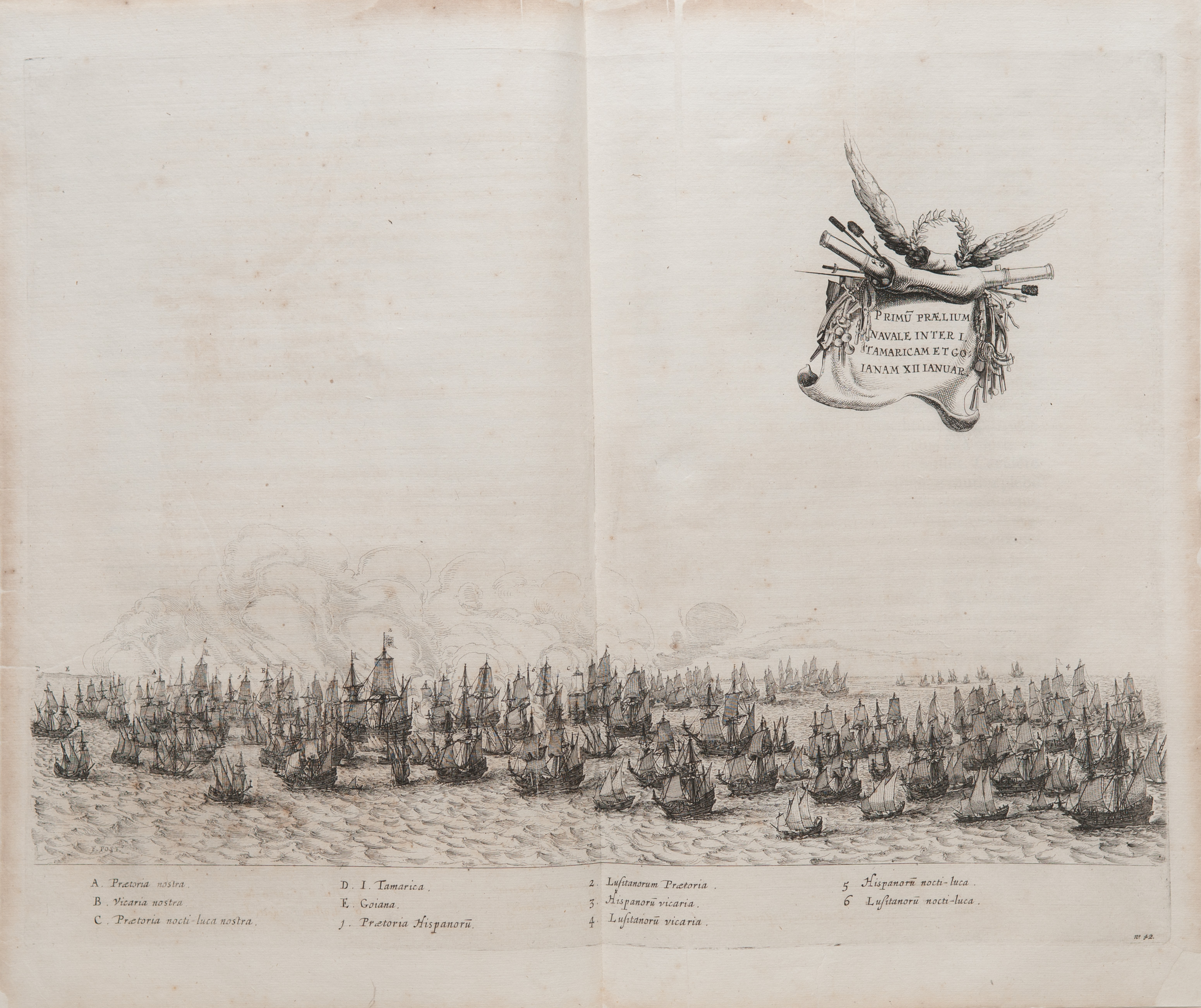
- Primu Praelium Navale Inter I. Tamarican et Go Ianam XII lanuar
Date	12–17 January 1640
Location	Itamaracá, off Pernambuco, Brazil
Result	Dutch victory

Belligerents
Spain; Portugal	Dutch Republic: West India Company

Commanders and leaders
(Portugal) Fernando de Mascarenhas	(Dutch West India Company) Willem Loos †

Strength
30 galleons 34 armed transports 13 small vessels 10,000-15,000 men	30 warships and supply ships 10 small vessels 2,800 men

Casualties and losses
2 vessels lost	1 vessel lost

The action of 12–17 January 1640 was a naval battle between a Dutch fleet and a combined Spanish-Portuguese fleet during the Eighty Years' War. The battle took place on the Brazilian coast off Pernambuco and was an attempt by a fleet consisting of approximately eighty vessels transporting about 5,000 soldiers under the command of Portuguese Admiral Fernando de Mascarenhas to land reinforcements to bolster the Portuguese militia besieging the city of Recife. On 12 January this fleet was intercepted by a Dutch task force of about forty ships commanded by Willem Loos. The ensuing battle lasted with occasional breaks until the evening of 17 January, when the Spanish and Portuguese fleet retreated and sailed away to the north.

== Background ==
About 30 Spanish and Portuguese vessels under Admiral don Lope de Hoces arrived off Dutch Brazil in November 1635. Although the fleet failed to overrun Pernambuco, supplies and 2,500 Spanish, Portuguese, and Neapolitan reinforcements were successfully landed at the Lagunas under General Luis de Rojas y Borja. The Dutch vessels in the area were driven off and de Hoces spent some months escorting a sugar convoy to the Spanish Main and preparing a counter-invasion of the Dutch-held island of Curaçao which was finally abandoned because the siege train was lost in a wreck. The expedition was seen as a success in Spain, however, because the landed troops greatly contributed to the defeat of John Maurits of Nassau's attack over Bahia. Another expedition was planned at Hoces'a arrival to retake the Dutch base of Pernambuco.

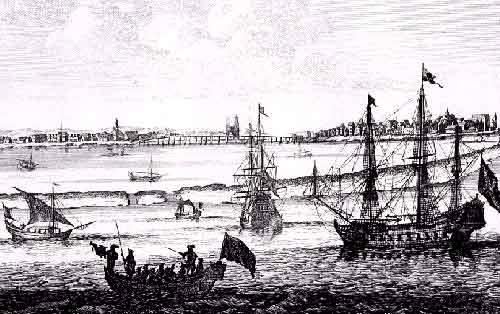
View of the city of Mauricia (Recife), based on a drawing from Frans Post, 1645

The command of this expedition would be entrusted to Miguel de Noronha, 4th Count of Linhares, for which he was appointed Capitán General del Mar Océano, but he eventually declined to lead the fleet as he did not trust in the success of the expedition. García de Toledo Osorio, 6th Marquess of Villafranca, also rejected its command, but not the Count of Torre, Dom Fernando de Mascarenhas, former Portuguese governor of Tangier. The same day that the French siege of Hondarribia was lifted, he was given the command of 41 ships, of which 23 were Portuguese and were commanded by Admiral Dom Francisco Melo de Castro and Vice Adm. Dom Cosme Couto de Barbosa, and 18 were Castilian under Admiral Juan de la Vega y Bazán and Vice Adm. Francisco Díaz Pimienta. 5,000 soldiers of infantry were embarked aboard the ships. Half of them were of the Tercio de Anfibios, a unit specialized in naval fighting.

The fleet stopped at the islands of Cape Verde, where an epidemic struck the crews of the ships, resulting in the death of 3,000 men and a number plus larger of incapacitated at the arrival of the fleet to Salvador da Bahia. Mascarenhas, ignoring his orders for an immediate assault upon Recife, spent about a year in the town before he set sail again, which was done in January 1640 with the intention to land 1,200 soldiers under Luís Barbalho Bezerra to reinforce the Portuguese guerrillas surrounding the Dutch garrison of Pernambuco.

== Battle ==
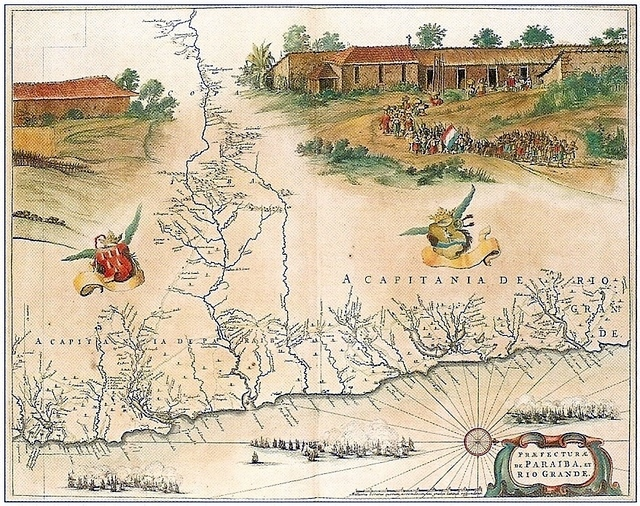
Map of Paraíba and Rio Grande do Norte, 1643, by Frans Post

A Dutch fleet of 36 ships under Admiral Willem Corneliszoon Loos and Vice Adm. Jacob Huygens emerged from Recife and intercepted the Spanish-Portuguese fleet between Itamaracá and Goiana on 12 January, before any attempted disembarkation could be effected. The battle degenerated into a confused melee in which Loos lost 2 of his vessels, while Loos himself was killed aboard his flagship while confronting Mascarenhas' flagship. Some Dutch ships managed to approach and disengage it from the Spanish flagship, but the vessel sank, taking down the admiral. Another Dutch ship, the Alemar, was riddled by the Spanish guns and nearly sank, being unable to continue the pursuit.

Vice Adm. Huygens, now aboard Loos' former flagship the Faam, continued the chase and the action was resumed the following day between Goiana and Cabo Branco. The Dutch fought a long-range battle using their superior artillery, but the only ship lost that day was the Dutch Soleil Brillant, badly damaged and sank with its commander and 44 soldiers. On 14 January Huygens renewed the attack off Paraíba. The Portuguese galleon of Capt. António da Cunha Andrade was captured, and another Spanish vessel of the Squadron of Castile ran aground and was boarded while fighting the Dutch Zwaan. Its crew under the Neapolitan Colonel Ettore della Calce was taken prisoner. The Dutch Zwaan, under Rear Admiral Aldrichsz, lost its mainmast and, washed away, ran aground on the coast.

Compelled to sail northwest, the Spanish-Portuguese fleet arrived before Rio Grande closely followed by the Dutch. The lack of wind prevented both fleets from attacking each other until 17 January. That day the Dutch won the windward and attacked the Spanish-Portuguese. Mascarenhas' ship was damaged, after which the Dutch fleet abandoned the pursuit and the Spanish-Portuguese vessels could land the army at Cape São Roque, too far to threaten Recife. Losses occurred on both sides, but the battle is regarded as a Dutch victory. The behavior of three captains in the battle, nevertheless, displeased the Count of Nassau, who condemned them to death "for not fulfilling his military duties in front of the galleons of Spain". Mascarenhas was also punished, being arrested upon his arrival in Spain.

== Aftermath ==
The Dutch garrison of Recife was increased in March 1640 by 2,500 soldiers carried aboard 28 ships under Admirals Cornelis Jol and Jan Lichthart, who was in charge of naval operations to disrupt the Portuguese sugar trade. In December Portugal revolted against the Spanish Habsburg rule, proclaiming the seventh Duke of Bragança as King João IV in place of Philip IV of Spain. Although the Dutch welcomed the news of the revolt, expecting the Portuguese to become their allies, this did not happen, as the Dutch had no wish to restore the occupied territories to Portugal. Recife served as a base for an expedition under Jol and Lichthart, in 1641, to seize Portugal's slaving depots in Angola before any treaty could be concluded in Europe, and despite a ten-year truce between both countries that was signed on 12 June, the hostilities continued, resulting in the expulsion of the Dutch from Brazil in 1654.

== Bibliography ==
- (in Spanish) Cesáreo Fernández Duro. Armada española desde la unión de los reinos de Castilla y de León, Vol. IV. Est. tipográfico Sucesores de Rivadeneyra, Madrid, 1898.
- (in French) Le Clerc, Jean. Histoire des Provinces-Unies des Pays-Bas, depuis la naissance de la République jusqu'à la Paix d'Utrecht & le Traité de la Barrière en 1716. Avec les principales médailles et leur explication, Vol. 2. L'Honoré et Chatelain, 1728.
- Marley, David. Wars of the Americas: a chronology of armed conflict in the New World, 1492 to the present. ABC-CLIO, 2008. ISBN 978-0-87436-837-6
- (in Dutch) Warnsicnk, J.C.M.Van vlootvoogden en zeeslagen, Amsterdam, 1940.
