= Francisco Díaz Pimienta =

Spanish naval officer

- Born: 1594; Tazacorte, Canary Islands
- Died: 1652 (aged 58)
- Occupation: Admiral
- Known for: Capture of Isla de Providencia (Santa Catalina)

Signature
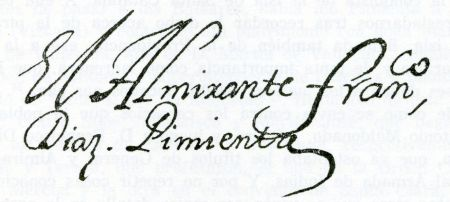

Francisco Díaz Pimienta (1594–1652) was a Spanish naval officer who became Captain general of the Ocean Fleet.

== Early years ==
Díaz Pimienta's father was also Francisco Díaz Pimienta, a member of the nobility who was born on La Palma in the Canary Islands. His father distinguished himself in the battle of Lepanto and was favored by king Philip II of Spain. Díaz Pimienta was born in 1594 in Tazacorte, an illegitimate child, and was raised by his aunt and uncle in Garachico, Tenerife. He went to Seville for academic studies, following his father's wish for him to enter the church. He was an excellent pupil, at the age of 14 being able to translate the works of Livy and Quintus Curtius with ease, but he was inspired by his father's example and wanted to go to sea. When his father died in 1610, Díaz Pimienta left school and joined the navy, serving on the galleons of the Indies.

One of Díaz Pimienta's sisters married a Canary merchant, Alonso Ferrera, who was connected to the shipbuilding industry, and this connection was to provide a great fortune. In 1625 he contracted with the Crown to construct two vessels, which were completed promptly after the victory of Dutch Admiral Piet Pieterszoon Hein in Cuban waters. Díaz Pimienta was appointed superintendent of the shipbuilding factories in the port of San Cristóbal de la Habana. From that moment his career began a steady ascent. In 1635, now an Admiral, Díaz Pimienta signed a new contract. Under the pretext of transporting materials to the shipyards, he was able to openly participate in trade between the Havana and Seville. In 1637 he was governor of the island of Menorca.

In 1638 Pimienta was vice-admiral in a Spanish-Portuguese fleet commanded by the Count of Torre, Dom Fernando de Mascarenhas, directed against the Dutch base at Pernambuco in Brazil. The fleet was affected by an epidemic at Cape Verde. After arriving with his weakened force at Salvador da Bahia, Mascarenhas delayed for about a year before sailing on Pernambuco with the intent of landing troops to take the town. Before disembarkation could start, on 12 January 1640 a Dutch fleet of 36 ships under Admiral Willem Corneliszoon Loos emerged from Recife and intercepted the Spanish-Portuguese fleet between Itamaracá and Goiana. The resulting five-day action of 12–17 January 1640 was indecisive. Both fleets were damaged and suffered casualties, but the effect was to prevent the Spanish-Portuguese landings.

== Capture of Providencia ==
Portugal gained independence in 1640. Shortly after the first revolutionary explosion in Lisbon, the fleet of galleons commanded by General Diaz Pimienta arrived in Cartagena. There were many Portuguese in these vessels, who plotted to get rid of the Spaniards and return to their homeland. Diaz thwarted these plans. He then ordered an attack on the Providence Island colony, on the island known as Santa Catalina to the Spanish, to free it from English rule.

Díaz Pimienta sailed from Cartagena to Providence Island with seven large ships, four pinnaces, 1,400 soldiers and 600 seamen, arriving on 19 May 1641. His ships had difficulty finding a way through the reefs that surround the island, and on 19 May the 400-ton San Marcos struck an outcrop and was so damaged the ship had to return to Cartagena, taking with it a third of the siege train and 270 troops. At first Díaz Pimienta planned to attack the poorly defended east side, and the English rushed there to improvise defenses. With the winds against him, Díaz Pimienta changed plans and made for the main New Westminster harbor and launched his attack at dawn on 24 May. He held back his large ships to avoid damage, and used the pinnaces to attack the forts. The Spanish troops quickly gained control, and once the forts saw the Spanish flag flying over the governor's house, they began negotiations for surrender. The English surrendered under an agreement that they would be repatriated to England.

On 25 May 1641, Díaz Pimienta formally took possession of the Providence Island colony and celebrated mass in the church. The Spanish took sixty guns, and captured the 350 settlers who remained on the island – others had escaped to the Mosquito coast. There were also 381 African slaves, making 731 prisoners in total. The Spanish found gold, indigo and cochineal as well as the slaves, worth a total of 500,000 ducats, some of the accumulated booty from the English raids. Rather than destroy the defenses, as instructed, Díaz Pimienta left a small garrison of 150 men to hold the island and prevent occupation by the Dutch.

When the fleet left Santa Catalina, the Portuguese Ajuda attempted to break away, and was wrecked on the reefs. Diaz Pimienta ordered two of the officers to be shot and their bodies displayed on the wreckage as an example to the others. The Captain-General of Cartagena did not honor the promise to return the prisoners, and put about 500 of them to work clearing the Magdalena river. About sixty women and a few children were given a passage back to England. Pimienta's decision to occupy the island was approved in 1643 and he was made a knight of the Order of Santiago.

== Later career ==
After the engagement at Providencia, renewed mutinies occurred in almost all Portuguese vessels, which were overcome with difficulty. In one of the galleons, the Lusitanians killed the captain Juan Lopez de Franca and seized the ship, with which they headed to Lisbon. Diaz ordered the mutineers to be tried in a court chaired by General Rodrigo Lobo, with the Portuguese Juan Rodriguez de Vasconcellos Sousa, Count of Castelo Melhor, as a prosecutor. Several of the culprits were hanged in the admiral's ship. Pimienta then sailed for Portobelo, while the rest of the fleet returned to Cartagena. Here, the Count of Castel Melhor prepared a major uprising. The intention was to seize the magazines, fortifications and galleons anchored in the harbor. We do not know if the plan was to take Cartagena for Portugal or just to dominate the city while preparing to evacuate the Portuguese subjects. The plan was denounced to the Governor of Cartagena, who took control of the fortifications saying that pirates were attacking. Castilmillor and the ringleaders of the conspiracy were incarcerated. On his return to Cartagena, Pimienta ordered that Castilmillor be tried by two judges, who sentenced him to death. Before the sentence was carried out, Castilmillor and two of his companions escaped from prison and managed to board a Portuguese ship that the Duke of Braganze had sent from Lisbon.

Díaz Pimienta left Cadiz on 2 June 1643, arriving in Cartagena of 19 July 1643 after a prosperous journey. On 31 December 1643, Díaz Pimienta arrived with his fleet in the Bay of Cadiz. On 27 February 1646 he was in Majorca, from where he had to transport new pieces of artillery to Mahón, with gunpowder, shells and the gun crews.

The Battle of Orbetello was fought on 14 June 1646 off the Spanish-ruled town of Orbetello on the coast of Tuscany, which was being besieged by the French. Díaz de Pimienta was the second in command to the Count of Linhares. Pimienta was in charge of 22 galleons and frigates, and Linhares commanded 30 galleys. They were opposed by Grand Admiral Jean Armand de Maillé-Brézé with 24 sailing ships and 20 galleys. There was little wind, so the galleys towed the sailing vessels, which did the fighting. The result was inconclusive, with both fleets suffering damage until they separated at dusk. On 25 June, Pimienta landed with a force of 3,300 soldiers who attacked the French lines, but were forced to retreat and reembark.

On 14 April 1648, while Spain was at war with France over the territory of Roussillon, the king appointed Díaz Pimienta Governor of Menorca, Royal Councillor and Captain General of the Ocean Sea Fleet. The Spanish were often remiss in providing pay and provisions for the sailors. In 1652, Diaz Pimienta, captain-general of the Atlantic fleet, reported that many of his crew were deserting, even "those who until now have been trustworthy for guarding the others." He was concerned that the whole fleet would be abandoned. The ships were running out of food and drinking water because nobody could be trusted to go to shore to get it. Díaz Pimienta was killed in battle in 1652.
