= Recapture of Bahia =

1625 battle of the Eighty Years War

- Part of the Dutch invasions of Brazil
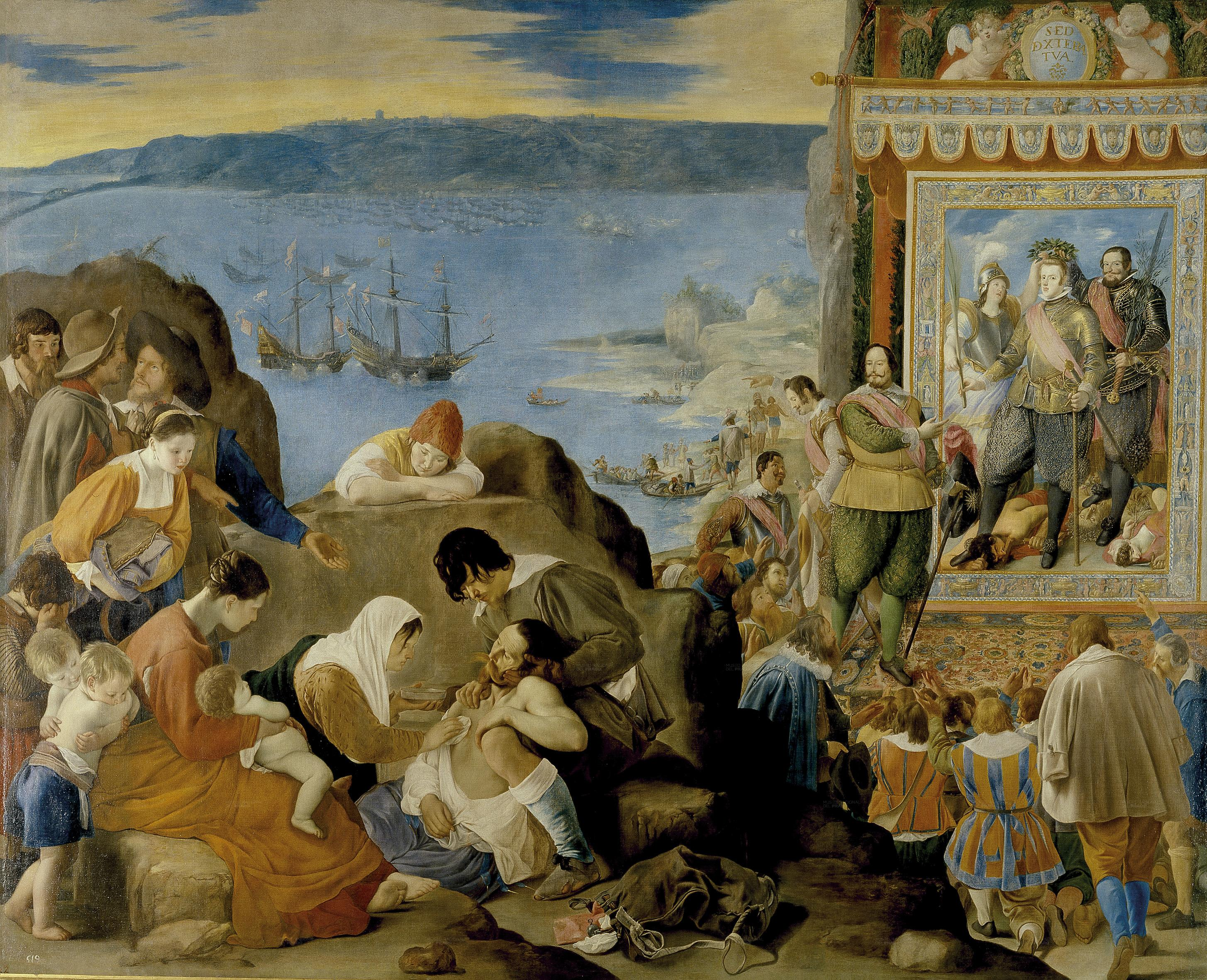
- The Recovery of Bahía de Todos los Santos; Juan Bautista Maíno, 1634–1635
Date	1 April – 1 May 1625
Location	Present-day Salvador, Bahia, Brazil 12°58′S 38°30′W
Result	Spanish–Portuguese victory

Belligerents
Spain; Portugal	Dutch Republic; WIC

Commanders and leaders
Fadrique de Toledo; Francisco de Ribera; Manuel de Menezes	Willem Schoutens †; Hans Kyff †

Strength
12,000 men 52 ships	3,000 to 5,000 men 18 ships

Casualties and losses
At least 71 killed and 64 wounded	Unknown killed or wounded 1,912 captured 12 ships sunk 6 ships captured 260 guns captured

The recapture of Bahia (Portuguese: Jornada dos Vassalos; Spanish: Jornada del Brasil) was a Spanish–Portuguese military expedition in 1625 to retake the city of Bahia (now Salvador) in Brazil from the forces of the Dutch West India Company (WIC).

In May 1624, Dutch WIC forces under Jacob Willekens captured Salvador from the Portuguese. Philip IV, king of Spain and Portugal, ordered the assembly of a combined army and naval task force with the objective of recovering the city. The task force, consisting of Spanish and Italian tercios and Spanish and Portuguese naval units, was commanded by Fadrique Álvarez de Toledo y Mendoza, who was appointed Captain General of the Army of Brazil. The fleet crossed the Atlantic Ocean, and arrived at Salvador on 1 April 1625. The town was besieged for several weeks, after which it was recaptured. This resulted in the expulsion of the Dutch from the city and the nearby areas. The city was a strategically important Portuguese base in the struggle against the Dutch for control of Brazil.

== Background ==
On 22 December 1623, a Dutch fleet under the command of Admiral Jacob Willekens and Vice Admiral Pieter Heyn consisting of 35 ships, of which 13 were owned by the United Provinces, while the rest belonged to the WIC, sailed from Texel carrying 6,500 men en route to Cape Verde, where they arrived after being scattered by a storm. There Willekens revealed that his objective was the capture of the city of Salvador, on the coast of Brazil, in order to use its port as a commercial base to ensure the Dutch trade with the East Indies. In addition they would control much of the sugar production in the region, as Salvador was a major center of its production in the area. These intentions to invade Brazil were soon reported to the court of Madrid by the Spanish spies in the Netherlands, but Count-Duke of Olivares did not give them credit.

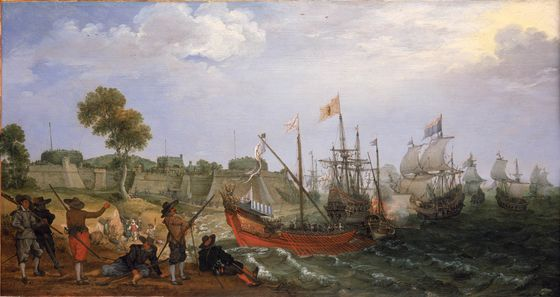
A Dutch Squadron attacking a Portuguese Fortress in the Far East or Brazil. Oil on panel by Adam Willaerts.

On 8 May, the Dutch fleet appeared off Salvador. The Portuguese governor of Salvador, Diogo de Mendonça Furtado, organized the defense of the town by hastily recruiting 3,000 men. This Portuguese militia was composed mainly of peasant levees and black slaves, many of whom were resentful of Spanish rule. The port was protected by sea by two forts: Fort Santo Antônio from the east and Fort São Filipe from the west. Additionally, a six-gun battery was erected on the beach and the streets were barricaded.

The Dutch fleet entered the bay divided into two squadrons. One sailed towards the beach of Santo António and disembarked the soldiers commanded by Colonel Johan van Dorth. The other anchored offshore and opened fire on the coastal defenses, which were quickly neutralized. At dawn the city was surrounded by more than 1,000 Dutch soldiers with 2 pieces of artillery. Intimidated, the Portuguese militia threw down their weapons and fled, leaving Mendonça with 60 loyal soldiers. Salvador had been captured at a cost of 50 casualties among the attackers.

Willekens and Heyn installed a garrison under the command of Dorth before departing on new missions, according to the orders they had received. Four ships were sent to Holland carrying booty and news back, and also instructions to call for reinforcements to secure Salvador. The defenses of the city were reinforced and expanded with moats and ramparts and the garrison was soon increased to up to 2,500 men with numerous slaves of the Portuguese seduced by promises of freedom and land.

However, the Dutch garrison soon began to be harassed by the local guerrilla organized by Bishop Dom Marcos Teixeira, who had escaped inland. He managed to assemble a force of 1,400 Portuguese and 250 Indian auxiliaries, who built fortifications and organized ambushes against the Dutch in the surrounding forests. Dorth was killed while attempting to drive off the attackers from the outskirts of town, and morale sagged. He was replaced by Albert Schoutens, who also perished in a later ambush and was replaced by his brother Willem Schoutens.

== Campaign ==
=== Iberian Expedition ===
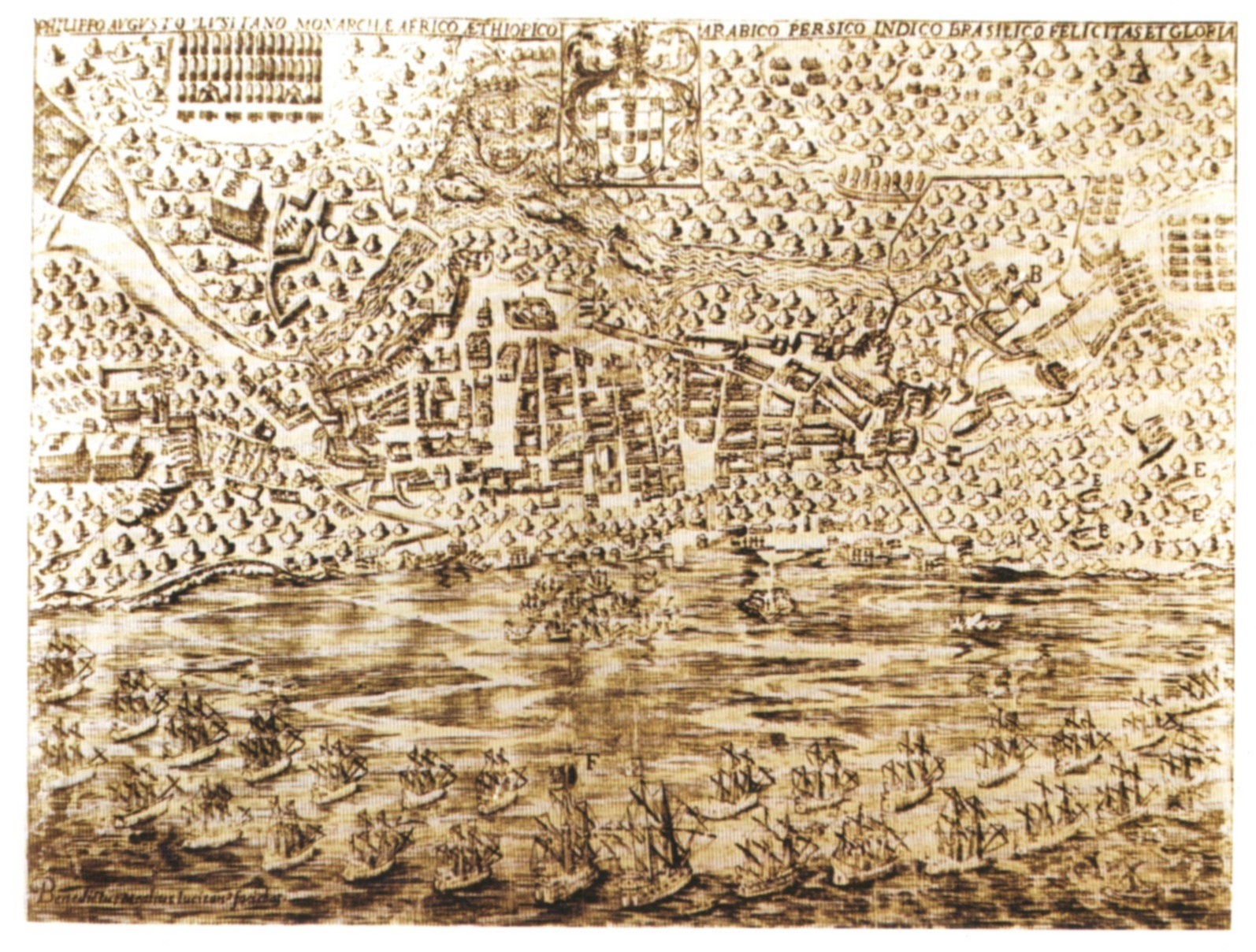
Engraving by Benedictus Mealius Lusitanus, in Jornada dos Vassalos da Coroa de Portugal, Lisbon, 1625

When news of the loss of Salvador arrived to Spain in August 1624, Philip IV ordered to assemble a joint Spanish-Portuguese fleet under Admiral Fadrique Álvarez de Toledo y Mendoza with the mission to retake the city. On 22 November, the Portuguese fleet under Manuel de Menezes, with Francisco de Almeida as second in command, left Lisbon. It was composed of 22 ships and about 4,000 men. The Spanish fleet left the port of Cádiz on 14 January after a delay caused by bad weather. It was composed by 38 ships belonging to the armadas of Castile, Biscay, Gibraltar, and Cuatro Villas, among them 21 galleons. It had 8,000 sailors and soldiers on board, being those latter divided in three tercios, of whom one was Italian and the other two Spanish. Its commanding officers were the maestros de campo Pedro Osorio, Juan de Orellana, and Carlo Andrea Caracciolo, Marquis of Torrecuso. The commander-in-chief of the joint army was Pedro Rodríguez de Sebastián, seconded by Sargento Mayor Diego Ruiz.

After passing through the Canary Islands on 28 January, the Spanish fleet arrived at Cape Verde on 6 February, where it joined the Portuguese fleet. This one had lost a ship and 140 men drowned in the shoals of the Isle of Maio. Five days later, after holding a council of war, the joint fleet sailed to Brazil. After waiting for some Portuguese ships delayed by rough seas and 7 caravels under the command of Francisco de Moura sent from Pernambuco, the fleet entered the Bay of Todos os Santos on 29 March.

=== Siege ===
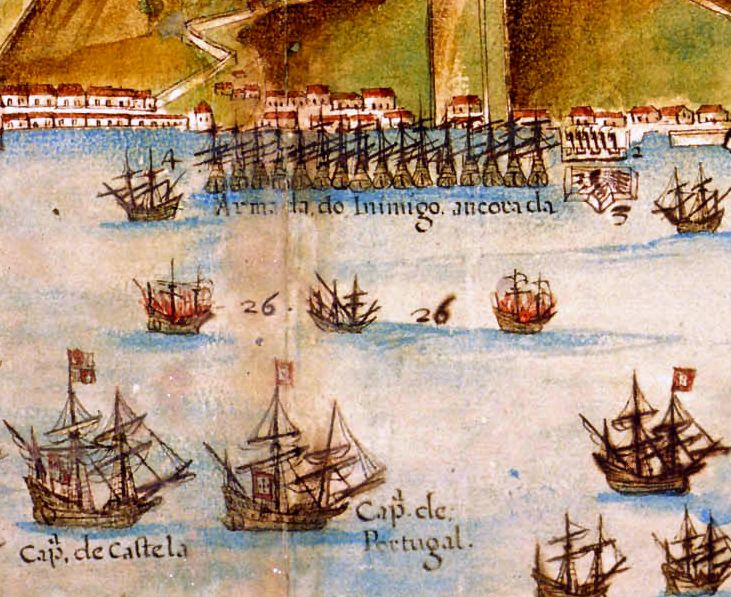
Detail of a map showing the joint Spanish-Portuguese fleet recapturing Salvador, Bahia in 1625, Atlas of Brazil by João Teixeira Albernaz I (1631)

Toledo anchored his fleet forming a huge crescent to prevent the escape of the Dutch ships in the bay. At dawn of the following day 4,000 soldiers landed at Santo António beach with food and supplies for four days. They joined the Portuguese guerrillas and occupied the field above Salvador. The Dutch were forced back within their walls, warping their 18 ships beneath the protection of their batteries. Their strength at that time amounted to 2,000 Dutch, English, French, and German soldiers and about 800 black auxiliaries.

The quarters of Carmen and San Benito, located both outside the walls, were occupied by the tercios, and a new one, named Las Palmas, was built. Siege warfare ensued, with the artillery firing over the Dutch fortifications from these positions and the pioneers driving saplines toward the Dutch ramparts. The defenders launched several sporadic attacks to obstruct the siege works. During one of these sallies, maestro de campo Pedro Osorio and 71 Spanish officers and soldiers were killed and another 64 wounded. Nevertheless, the siege continued.

Two days later, the Dutch attempted to break the blockade sending two fire ships against the anchored Spanish-Portuguese fleet, but they didn't cause any damage. Some mutinies emerged among the defenders following this failure, and Willem Schoutens was deposed and replaced by Hans Kyff. He was forced to capitulate a few weeks later, when the siege lines finally reached Salvador's moats. 1,912 Dutch, English, French, and German soldiers surrendered, and 18 flags, 260 guns, 6 ships, 500 black slaves, and considerable amount of gunpowder, money, and merchandise were captured.

== Aftermath ==
Several days after the Dutch surrender, a relief fleet of 33 ships under Admiral Boudewijn Hendricksz, seconded by Vice Admiral Andries Veron, bore down upon the bay divided in two columns. Toledo, who was warned about its arrival, disposed 6 galleons to lure them into a crossfire. However, after spotting the large Spanish-Portuguese fleet anchored inside the bay, Hendricksz quickly withdrew to open sea. Spanish warships attempted to pursue him but a galleon ran aground and the chase was abandoned. Hendricksz divided his fleet in three groups. One of them returned to Holland with the supplies and ammunition for the garrison of Salvador; the other two attacked respectively the Spanish Caribbean colonial town of San Juan de Puerto Rico and the Portuguese African trading post of the Castle of Elmina but were both decisively defeated.

Francisco de Moura Rolim, appointed governor of Salvador by Fadrique de Toledo, remained in the town with a garrison of 1,000 Portuguese soldiers. During the journey back to Spain, 3 Spanish ships and 9 Portuguese ships sank in storms. Maestro de Campo Juan de Orellana was among the drowned men. The Dutch prisoners were returned to the Low Countries aboard five German store ships, with the officers facing trial on their arrival by the loss of the city. The Dutch did not return to Brazil until 1630, when they conquered Pernambuco from the Portuguese.

== See also ==
- Annus mirabilis
