= Luís Teixeira =

Portuguese cartographer

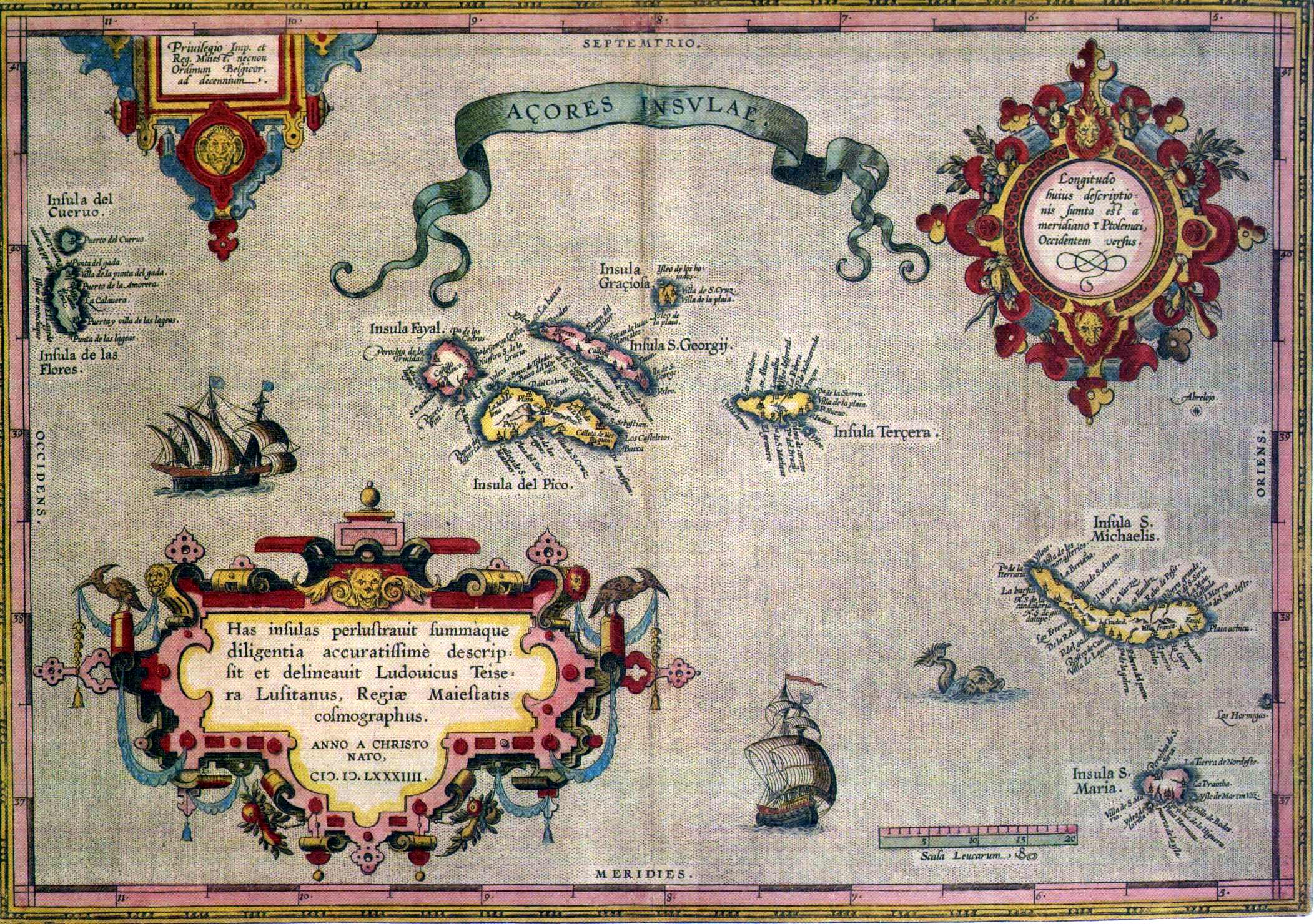
Luís Teixeira map of the Azores (1584)

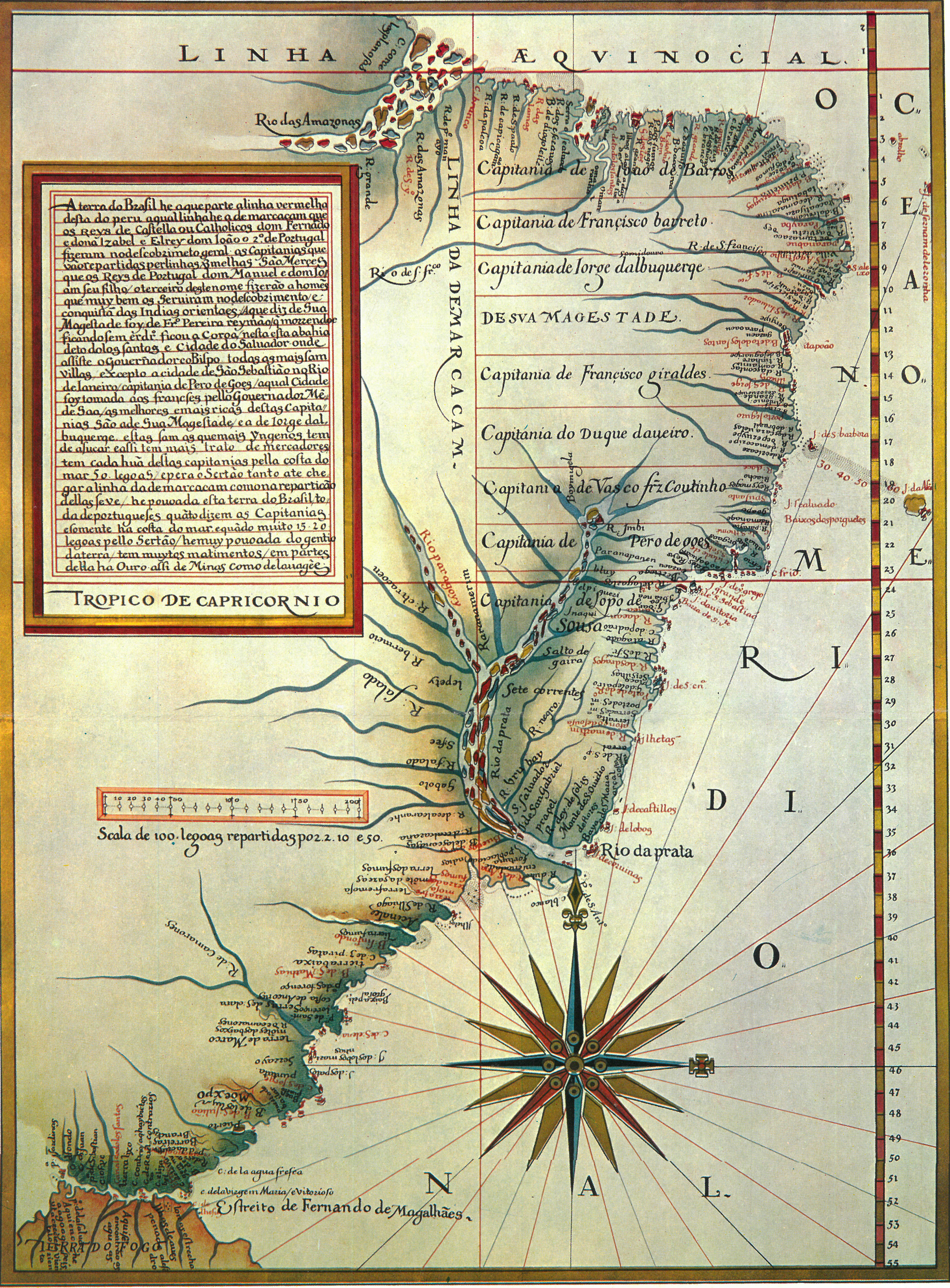
Map attributed to Luís Teixeira, with Brazil divided into captaincies

Luís Teixeira or Ludovico Teixeira was a 16th‑century Portuguese cartographer and mathematician. He had two sons, Pedro Teixeira Albernaz and João Teixeira Albernaz I, also cartographers. In 1564 he passed his licensing examination in cosmography under Pedro Nunes and Jorge Reinel, and by 1569 he held a royal commission to oversee the production and correction of all navigational charts and instruments for the crown’s fleets.

Teixeira contributed a well‑known early map of Japan (Iaponiae Insulae Descriptio) to Abraham Ortelius's atlas Theatrum Orbis Terrarum. It was the first separate map of Japan, and was for many years the standard map of Japan used by Europeans (until the 1655 map by Martino Martini).

An important atlas of the colony of Brazil is attributed to Teixeira, entitled Roteiro de todos os sinais, conhecimentos, fundos, baixos, alturas, e derrotas que há na costa do Brasil desde o Cabo de Santo Agostinho até ao estreito de Fernão de Magalhães (1586). He conducted original coastal surveys in Brazil between 1573 and 1578 and in the Azores before 1582; these formed the basis for his Brazilian rutter and for charts of the Azores published by Ortelius in 1582 and 1584.

== Nautical planisphere with isogonic lines ==
In about 1585, Teixeira crafted a fragment of a planisphere on vellum (57.2 × 79.8 cm), now held at the Navy Museum in Portugal (Museu de Marinha) (shelf mark CT‑III‑37). It portrays the Philippine Sea and adjacent western Pacific and is unique in bearing a system of symmetrically arranged isogonic lines—curved lines graduated in compass points (quartas, each 11¼ °)—ranging from two points west to two points east and intersecting the equator at regular 22½ ° intervals. Each isogonic line is further indicated by the angular displacement of a fleur de lis on one of nine wind roses along the chart's lower margin. This chart predates Edmond Halley's first printed isogonic chart (1702) by more than a century.

The fragment represents the earliest known graphical depiction of the Earth's magnetic declination field, combining a simple conceptual model—likely influenced by Fernando Oliveira's four‑agonic‑meridian hypothesis of c.1570—with empirical observations recorded by sixteenth‑century Portuguese navigators. Although the numerical values on Teixeira's map deviate from modern reconstructions, its broad pattern closely matches data derived from both palaeomagnetic and historical‑observation geomagnetic models for around 1590. The chart testifies to the systematic gathering of declination measurements during the Portuguese India Armadas and marks a milestone in the global representation of terrestrial magnetism.

Alegria and colleages (2007) place Teixeira at the heart of the second flourishing of Portuguese Renaissance cartography (c. 1500–1600), a period distinguished by high‑quality atlases and rutters under Kings Manuel I and John III, and note his role as progenitor of the multigenerational Teixeira–Albernaz cartographic dynasty that continued with his son João Teixeira Albernaz I.
