= Pedro Teixeira Albernaz =

Portuguese cartographer

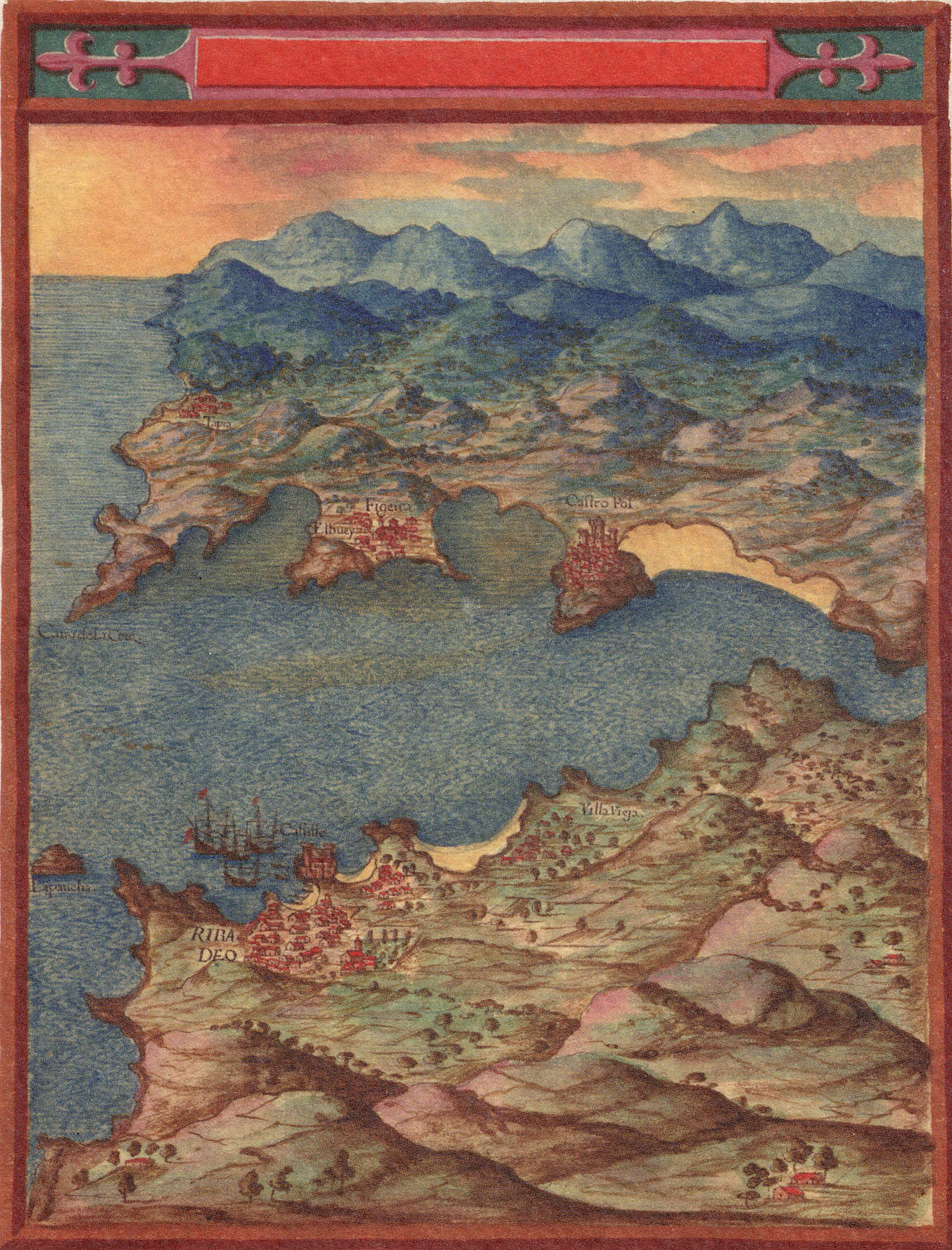
Ribadeo river by Pedro Teixeira,1634

Pedro Teixeira Albernaz was a Portuguese cartographer born in 1595 in Lisbon, Kingdom of Portugal. He came from a family of cartographers including his father Luís Teixeira, uncle Domingos Teixeira, and his brother João Teixeira Albernaz I whom he collaborated with. Around 1610, Pedro went to work in Spain. Pedro served as the royal cosmographer to Philip III of Spain (1598 -1621) and Philip IV (1621-1665). In the years 1622 to 1630 he worked on mapping the coasts of the Iberian Peninsula. Pedro changed his works from nautical charts to topographical survey chart throughout this time period. Pedro was appointed with his brother to make a map of Straits of Magellan and St. Vincent. Pedro died in 1662 in Madrid.

== Contributions ==
His 1634 work La descripción de España y de las costas y puertos de sus reinos (Description of Spain and of the Coasts and Ports of Her Kingdoms) is preserved in Vienna. Teixeira's map is made of twenty individual folios. The plates for the map were engraved by Salomon Savery (1594–1665) in Amsterdam. They were then printed by Jan and Jacques van Veerle in Antwerp in 1656. This work is six feet high and over nine feet wide and a good representation of a city under Habsburg rule. The map and writing along the border show Spain at the height of its power. The work also is a very accurate layout of the city at the time.

== Works ==
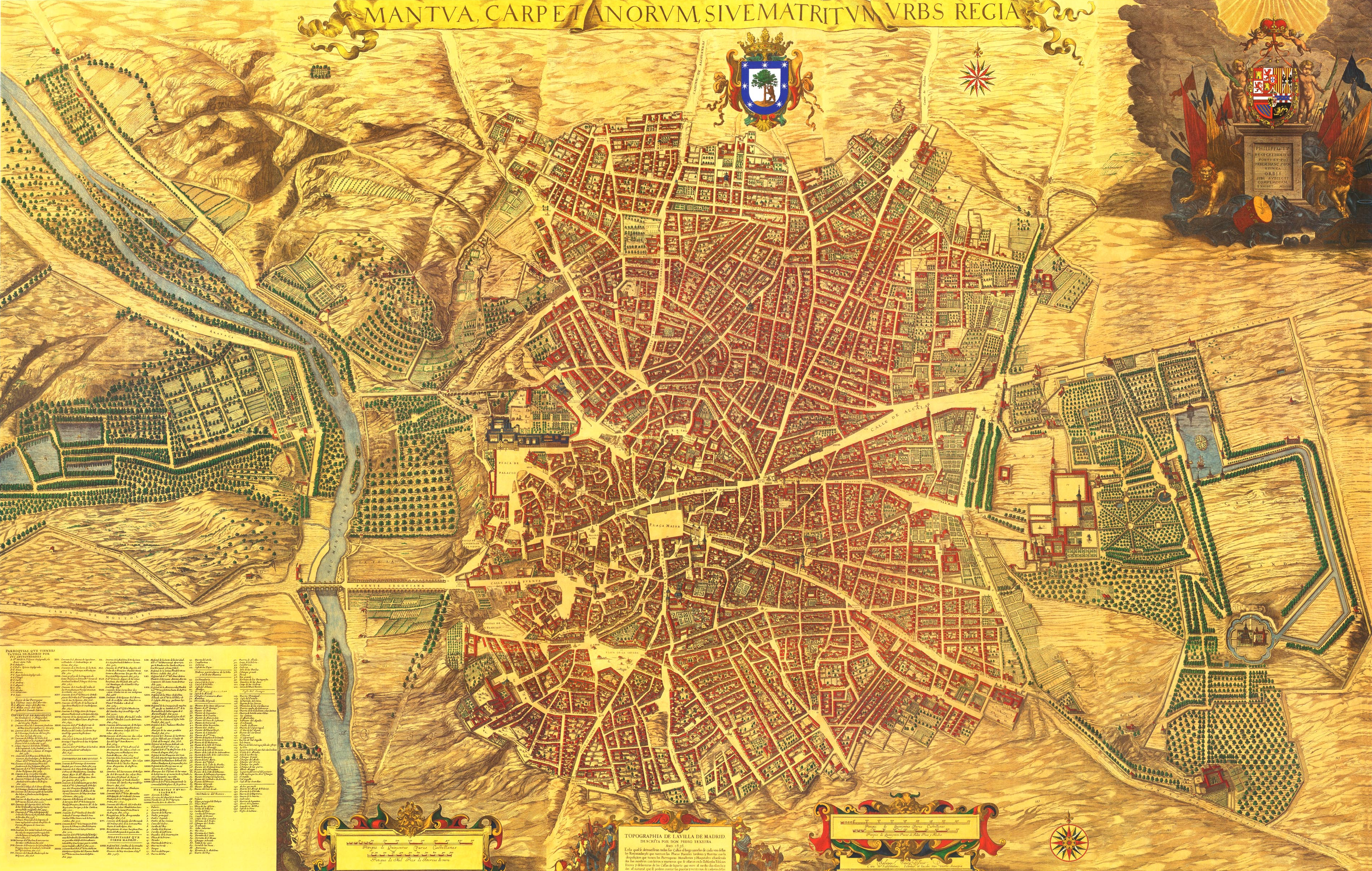
Map of Madrid by Pedro Teixeira (1656) Mantua Carpetatorum sive Matritum Urbs Regia.

- Carta dos Estreitos de S. Vicente e Magalhães (1621)
- La descripción de España y de las costas y puertos de sus reinos (1634)
- Topografía de Madrid (1656)
- Corral de la Cruz. Madrid (1656)
- El convento de la Trinidad Calzada de Madrid en el plano de Teixeira (1656)
- Corral del Príncipe. Madrid (1656)

== Bibliography ==
- CORTESÃO, Armando, e MOTA, Avelino Teixeira da, Portugaliae Monumenta Cartographica. Vols. IV, V, Lisboa: INCM, 1987.
- Jesús Escobar, Map as Tapestry: Science and Art in Pedro Teixeira's 1656 Representation of Madrid. The Art Bulletin: Vol. 96 Iss. 1, 2014
- MOTA, A. Teixeira da, Cartas Portuguesas Antigas na Colecção de Groote Schuur. Lisboa: Centro de Estudos de Cartografia Antiga/Junta de Investigações Científicas do Ultramar, 1977.
- "Pedro Teixeira Albernaz." Maps of The World Legends. MapsoftheWorld.com, n.d. Web.
- VITERBO, Sousa, Trabalhos Náuticos dos Portugueses, Séculos XVI e XVII. Lisboa: INCM, 1988.
