= Jacob Willekens =

Dutch admiral

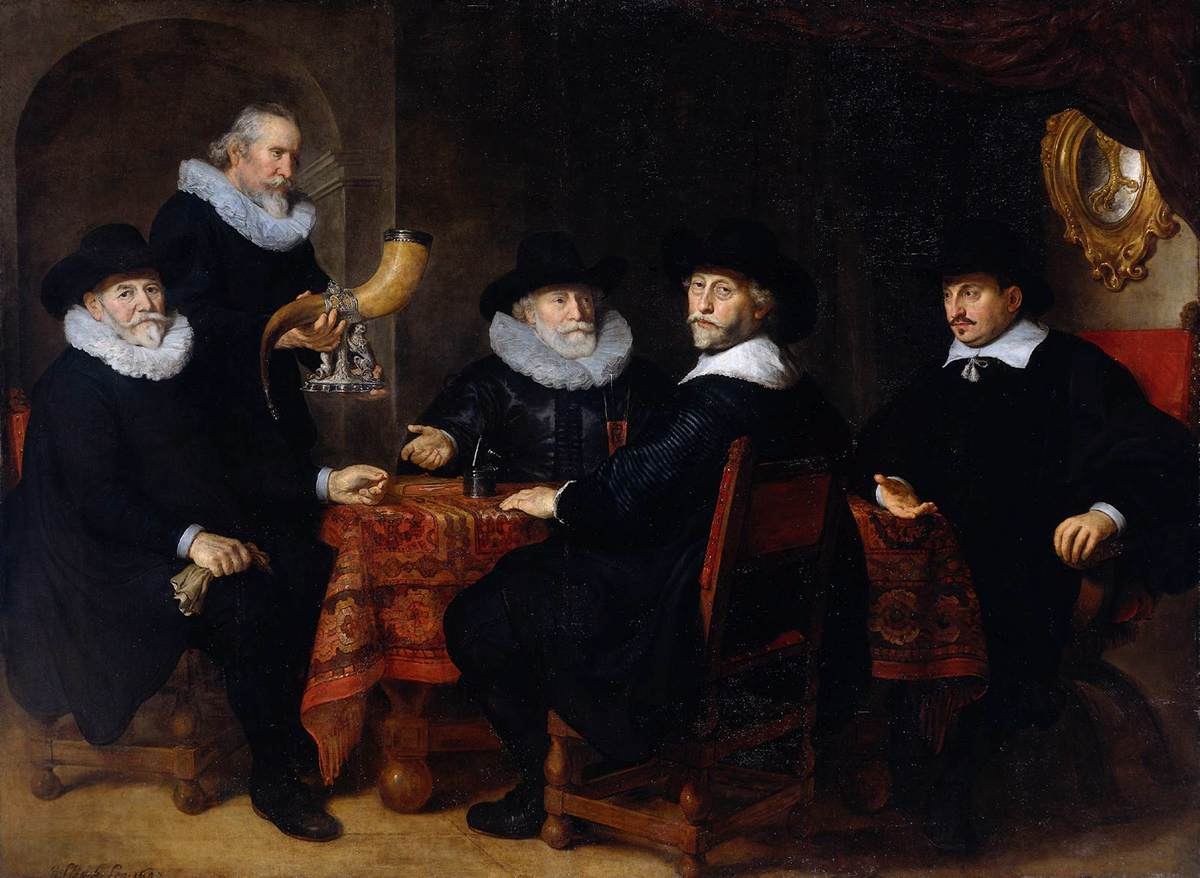
- Jacob Willekens, second from the right. Painting done in 1642 by Govert Flink.
- Born: 1564; Amsterdam, Netherlands
- Died: 1649 (aged 84–85); Amsterdam,
- Piratical career
- Allegiance: Netherlands
- Years active: 1590s-1630s
- Rank: Admiral
- Base of operations: Caribbean
- Battles: Eighty Years' War

Jacob Willekens or Wilckens (1564–1649) was a Dutch admiral on a fleet to the Dutch Indies, and a herring seller, who went to sea again at the age of fifty for the Dutch West Indies Company. His best-known success was the conquest of São Salvador da Bahia, the then capital of Brazil.

His fleet, which included Dutch corsair Piet Hein as vice admiral, departed from Texel on December 22, 1623, with between 26 and 36 ships and 3,300 sailors towards South America. At the beginning of June 1624, they began their attack from sea and soon captured the Portuguese stronghold with little resistance. They occupied Bahia for over a year before the local population took up arms under acting governor Matias de Albuquerque and Archbishop Dom Marcos Teixeira who eventually expelled them with the help of a combined Spanish-Portuguese fleet numbering 52 warships and 12,000 soldiers in May 1625. This was the first major WIC privateering expedition to the region.

He was also planning to participate in an attack on Rio de Janeiro with Hein in 1626, but after a dispute over who would be in command, the two separated with Willekens returning to Amsterdam. Willekens joined the vroedschap in 1639 and the Admiralty of Amsterdam. He was buried in the Zuiderkerk in 1649.
