= João Teixeira Albernaz I =

Portuguese cartographer

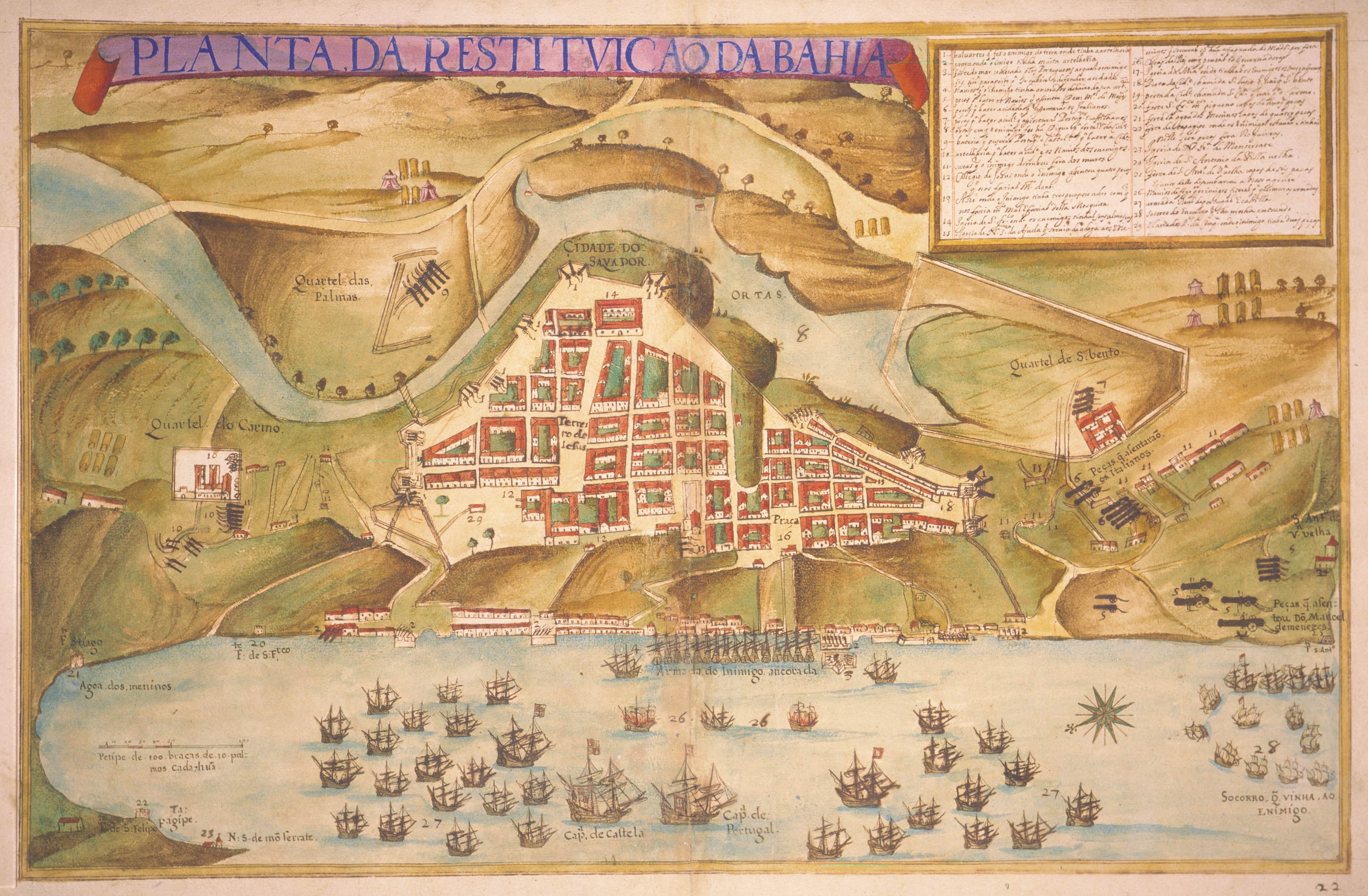
Map showing the recapture of Bahia from the Dutch, Atlas of Brazil (1631) I. Teixeira Albernaz

João Teixeira Albernaz I also referred to as João Teixeira Albernaz, the Elder (late 16th century – c. 1662), to distinguish him from his grandson, was the most prolific Portuguese cartographer of the seventeenth century. His works include nineteen atlases, a total of two hundred and fifteen maps. He stands out for the variety of themes, which record the progress of maritime and land exploration, particularly in the Portuguese colony of Brazil. João Teixeira Albernaz belonged to a prominent family of cartographers whose work extended from mid-sixteenth century until the late eighteenth century, including his father Luís Teixeira, uncle Domingos Teixeira, brother Pedro Teixeira Albernaz and grandson João Teixeira Albernaz, the younger, as well as Estevão Teixeira.

== Biography ==
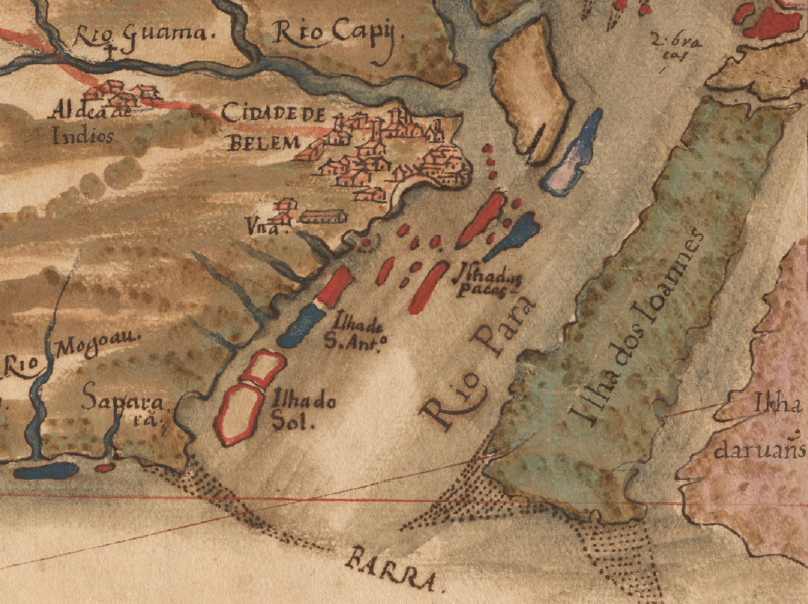
Detail of "Pequeno atlas do Maranhão e Grão-Pará" showing the city of Belém, Brazil, 1629

João Teixeira Albernaz must have learned the craft from his father Luís Teixeira, starting his own work in the seventeenth century. On 29 October 1602 he got his licence as master for "Nautical charts, astrolabes, compass needles and cross-staff", having been examined by the royal chief-cosmographer, João Baptista Lavanha. Three years later, in 1605, he was appointed cartographer for the Warehouse Guinea and India (Casa da Mina and India?), where he worked until the end of his life.

In the Archive of the Indies in Seville, there is a document recording his presence and also his brother, Pedro Teixeira in Madrid in order to design charts of Strait of St. Vincent and the Strait of Magellan. In 1622 presented a petition to the post of chief cosmographer, but the post was passed over to Valentim de Sá. In the late seventeenth century, in an opinion issued by Manuel Pimentel about the 1642 Atlas of Brazil, warns that errors in the first chart of this Atlas, which did not respect the boundary agreed between Portugal and Spain, concluding that the book was "no more than good paintings and illuminations".

== Works ==
Teixeira Albernaz's 1630 "General Chart for All Navigation" (Taboas Geraes de Toda a Navegação), displaying both the Tordesillas and Zaragoza Meridians (click to enlarge)

His work is of great interest both for its breadth and variety, and for the record of the progress of discovery and Portuguese maritime and overland exploration, particularly with regard to Brazil. His works amount to nineteen atlas, grouped and loose charts, in a total of two hundred and fifteen charts. Those include:

- c. 1616 – a copy of the codex titled "Rezão do Estado do Brasil". According to Francisco Adolfo de Varnhagen and Helio Vianna, only the charts of this codex are by João Teixeira.
- 1621 – Chart of the Strait of S. Vicente and Strait of Magellan, with his brother Pedro Teixeira de Albernaz
- c. 1626 – "Livro que dá Rezão do Estado do Brasil", containing twenty-two chats, being a larger copy of the earlier 1616
- 1630 – Atlas Taboas geraes de toda a navegação, divididas e emendadas por Dom Ieronimo de Attayde com todos os portos principaes das conquistas de Portugal delineadas por Ioão Teixeira cosmographo de Sua Magestade, anno de 1630, manuscript in the Library of Congress. The first map, a world map summarizing the geographic knowledge at the time, presents a controversial Tordesillas line shifted to the west, incorporating the mouth of the Rio de la Plata and northeastern North America under Portuguese rule.

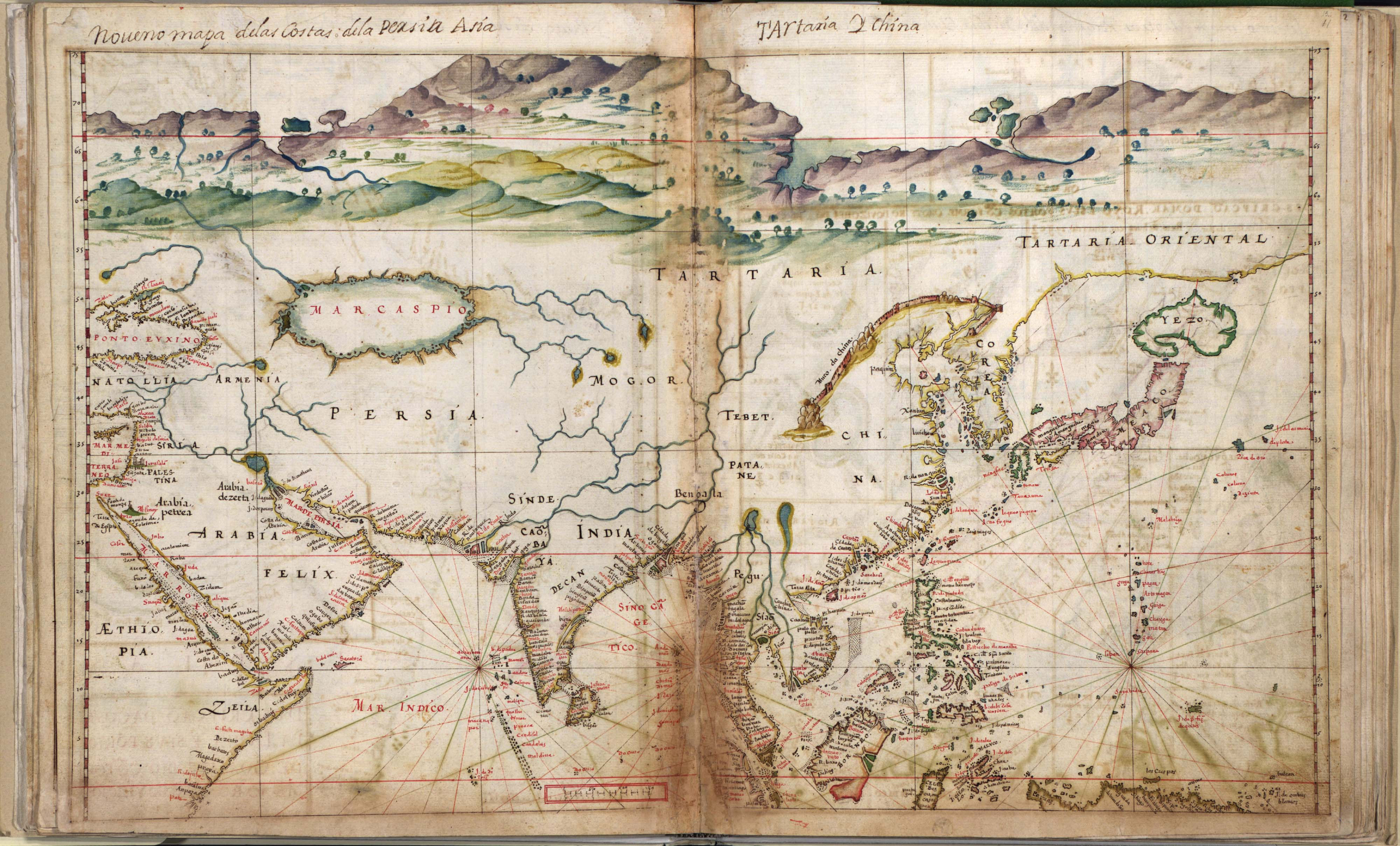
Taboas geraes de toda a navegação Asia map, João Teixeira Albernaz, 1630

- 1631 – Atlas of the State of Brazil, available in 1960 in the Map Collection of the Ministry of Foreign Affairs in Rio de Janeiro. Covers thirty-six charts displaying frames, legend and shields or grantees of the Crown, are not met. Have been sent by organizing D. Jerónimo de Athayde, the donee Captaincy of Ilhéus. Contains several elements illuminating on the sugar industry, as well as representing the estuaries of the Rio de la Plata and the Amazon River, showing the patterns of demarcation between Spain and Portugal;
- 1640 – Atlas of Brazil, composed of thirty-two letters on paper, that there are seven copies, of which the Historical Archives of the Ministry of Finance, Brazil. Has the particularity of each letter is preceded by a sheet with explanatory text. Codex exists in Torre do Tombo (Description of the land around the sea of St. Cross, commonly called Brazil, by John Teixeira, cosmographer of His Majesty the year 1640) is currently editing a full-color facsimile, showing thirty and letters, the first representing the territory of Brazil and the rest of its coast, with details of the final course of rivers, islands, ports and fortifications.
- 1643 – Atlas Universal (Livro vniversal das navegasões feito em Lisboa por Ioão Teixeira Cosmographo de Sva Magestade, Anno 1643), "Universal Atlas" with eight charts. Considered an exceptional artistic value, different from other Atlas of the author, because it presents essentially hydrographic information.

== Bibliography ==
- CORTESÃO, Armando; MOTA, Avelino Teixeira da. Portugaliae monumenta cartographica (v. IV). Lisboa: Imprensa Nacional-Casa da Moeda, 1987. Reprodução fac-similar da edição de 1960.
- DIAS, Maria Helena (coord.). Contributos para a História da Cartografia militar portuguesa [CD-ROM]. Lisboa: Centro de Estudos Geográficos [etc.], 2003. ISBN 972-636-141-9.
- DIAS, Maria Helena; BOTELHO, Henrique Ferreira (coord.). Quatro séculos de imagens da Cartografia portuguesa = Four centuries of images from Portuguese Cartography (2ª ed.). Lisboa: Comissão Nacional de Geografia [etc.], 1999. ISBN 972-765-787-7.
- MOTA, Avelino Teixeira da. Cartas Portuguesas Antigas na Colecção de Groote Schuur. Lisboa: Centro de Estudos de Cartografia Antiga/Junta de Investigações Científicas do Ultramar, 1977.
- VITERBO, Sousa. Trabalhos Náuticos dos Portugueses, Séculos XVI e XVII. Lisboa: INCM, 1988.
- Whincup, Paul; Campo López, Antonio (2022), "Origin of the Western Australian Land Boundary" (PDF), Journal of the Royal Society of Western Australia, Perth: Royal Society of Western Australia, pp. 35–42, archived from the original (PDF) on 2 March 2023.
