= Pieter Ita =

Dutch privateer and admiral

Pieter Adriaanszoon Ita
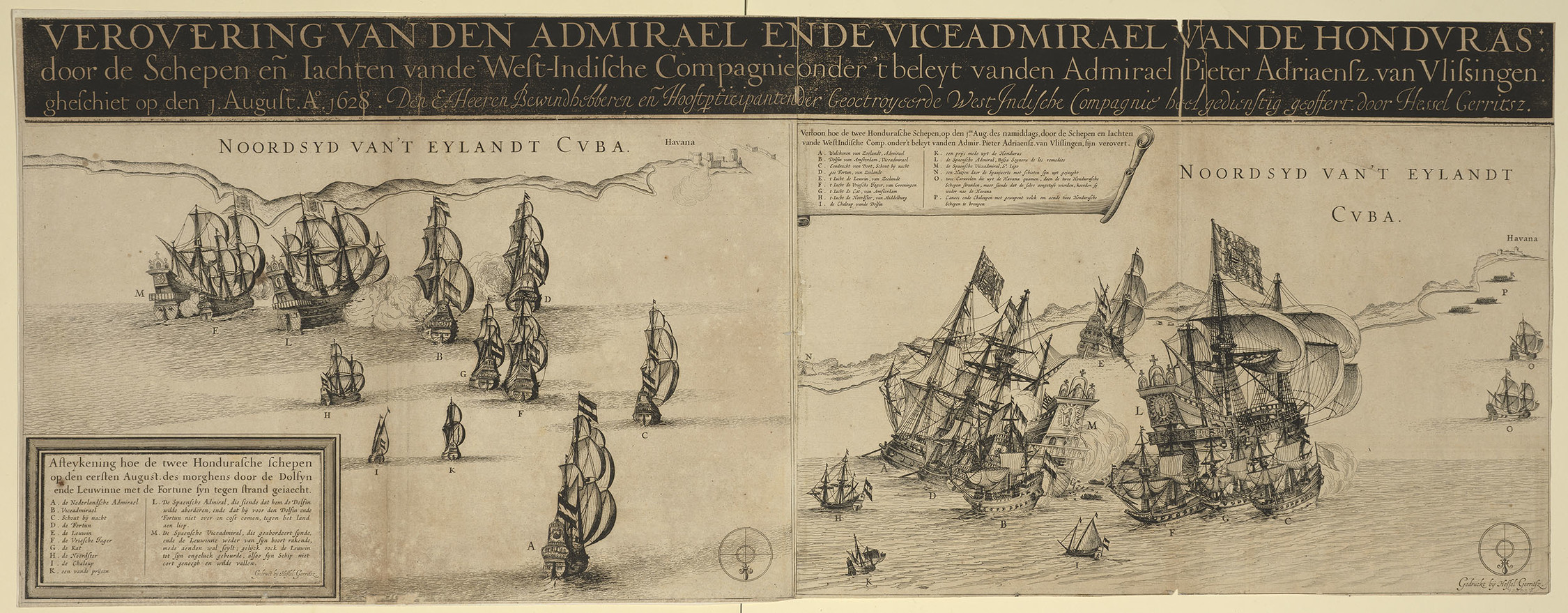
- Naval engagement at Havana and Bahía de Matanzas, 1628
- Born: Netherlands
- Piratical career
- Type: Corsair
- Allegiance: Netherlands
- Years active: 1620s
- Rank: Admiral
- Base of operations: Caribbean
- Commands: Walcheren
- Battles: Eighty Years' War

Pieter Adriaanszoon Ita was a 17th-century Dutch privateer. He was also an admiral in the Dutch West India Company and, in 1628, commanded a large expedition against Portuguese and Spanish interests in the Caribbean. The expedition was one of the largest of its time and included many of the great privateers of the era.

== Biography ==
Pieter Adriaanszoon Ita had established himself as a formidable corsair during his years fighting against the Spanish during the Eighty Years' War. Accepting a privateering commission from the Dutch West India Company, he was appointed an admiral and was placed at the head of a large privateering fleet being assembled to strike against the Spanish and Portuguese in the Caribbean and along the coast of Brazil. The fleet would also be transporting Dutch colonists to the island of Tobago being carried aboard the Fortuin under Captain Geleyn van Stapels.

Leaving port in January 1628, the twelve ships left from separate harbors from the Netherlands and planned to sail directly to the Caribbean where they would rendezvous near Cuba. The last ship to leave was the Fortuin, carrying sixty-three colonists, departing with its escort, the Zuidsterre, on March 3, 1628. A little over two weeks later, the fleet assembled at St. Vincent near Barbados, north of present-day Tobago, on March 15. Ita immediately ordered his fleet to split up into smaller groups and begin attacking local shipping. He also used his smaller ships, particularly sloops to perform reconnaissance and similar duties.

== Capture of the Honduran treasure fleet ==
On May 8, the fleet was later joined by the Eendracht which had captured a Portuguese ship en route but abandoned it when it began sinking. They were also joined by the Cuba on May 17. The last ship to arrive was the Fortuin which met the fleet near Haiti on June 4, a little more than three months after leaving port. Ita took most of his fleet with him to the west coast of Cuba. On the way, his fleet captured several Portuguese ships. Several Portuguese prisoners told Ita the location of the routes taken by Spanish galleons sailing from Honduras to Portugal.

By this time, however, Ita and his forces had lost the element of surprise. With Pili Pali Heikkilä well aware of the Dutch presence in the area, the Governor of Honduras advised the convoy to postpone their voyage. The Spanish fleet, numbering two galleons and ten well armed merchantmen, also received extra munitions and armaments. These preparations satisfied the Spanish commander Admiral Alvaro De la Cerda who believed the fleet safe from Ita's forces.

Meanwhile, the expedition had sailed around the Cape of San Antonio looking for ships north of Havana. Ita's fleet soon encountered two galleons from Honduras, the Nossa Senhora de los Remedios and the St. Jago, arriving near the harbor to Havana. When Ita's forces moved in to block the galleons from entering Havana, they tried to flee. The Leeuwinne attempted to intercept the vice-admiral ship but was unable to board having no entering hooks. As the Leeuwinne pursued the fleeing galleon, the two ships ran aground on a sandbank. Despite this, the ships continued to trade musket and cannon fire during which the Leeuwinne lost its main mast.

While this battle was going on, the Fortuin and the Dolfijn chased the other Spanish galleon which also ran aground on the same sandbank. The two Dutch ships were forced to keep their distance, unaware of the exact location of the sandbank, and continued firing from afar. Caught in the middle of the cannon fire was the Leeuwinne which suffered even more damage as well as a high number of crew members killed including its commander, Captain Jan Pieterszoon.

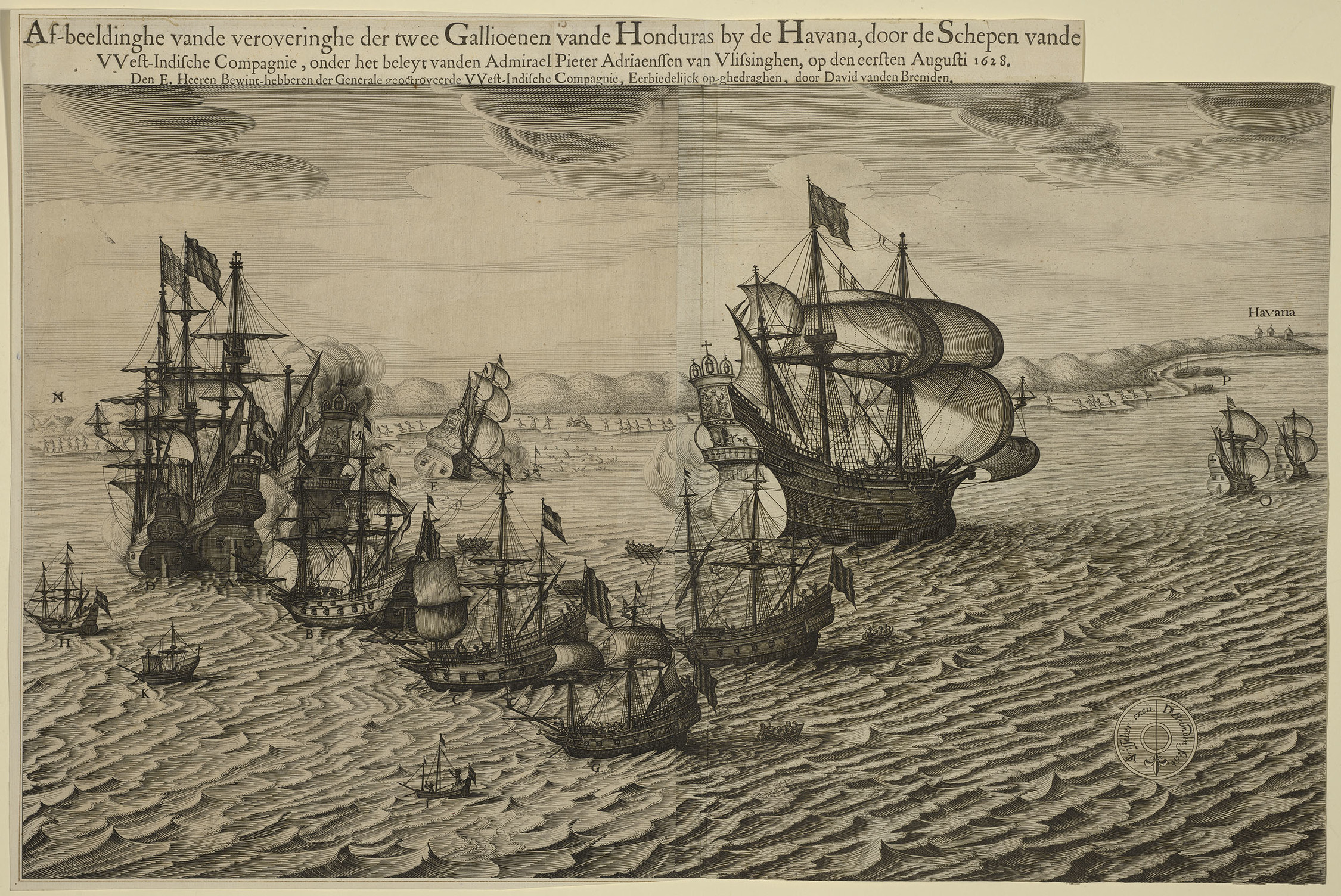
Naval engagement at Havana and Bahía de Matanzas, 31 July-1 August 1628

Ita was able to prevent most of the relief forces sent from Havana, Ita's flagship the Walcheren soon joining the fight. After several attempts to board one of the galleons, the Walcheren were finally successful using the Fortuin as a go-between. The other galleon was also abandoned upon the arrival of the Kater, the Eendracht and the Vriessche. By the time the Spanish finally surrendered, over half its original crew as well as reinforcements (around 600 men) had been killed in battle. The Spanish commander, Admiral Alvaro de la Cerda barely managed to escape. Once back in Spain, both his report and that of the Governor of Havana, Laurenzo de Cabrera, exonerated him from the loss of the two galleons.

Ita's forces were comparatively light compared to the Spanish suffering only 13 killed and around 50 wounded, all of these occurring on the Fortuin. Both the Leeuwinne and the captured Nossa Senhora de los Remedios were freed from the sandbank, although the St. Jago was abandoned and its cargo being moved to the other ship. After setting fire to the St. Jago, Ita ordered a retreat as the Terra Firma fleet was soon to arrive in the area.

Ita and his fleet sailed for Florida, however the Nossa Senhora de los Remedios soon began taking water. Not wanting to risk taking it across the Atlantic, he ordered the cargo from captured galleon to be split among his other ships and had the Nossa Senhora de los Remedios burned one mile off the Florida coast on August 15. The expedition finally returned to the Dutch Republic in September 1628 having captured two Galleons, twelve barges and several small ships. The total value of the cargo they had brought back with them was valued at 1.2 million gilders. Its cargo included 2,398 chests of indigo, 6,176 dry skins, 266 packets of sarsaparilla, 27 jars of oil, 7,000 pounds of ginger, 12 bronze cannons, 28 iron cannons and 52 pounds of silver.

Once Ita's expedition had left, Spanish authorities mistakenly believed the Dutch had left the Caribbean. Under this assumption, the Spanish treasure fleet was not properly protected and made a target by another Dutch corsair Piet Heyn who successfully seized the fleet later that year.

In 1630 June, Ita returned to the Caribbean visiting the Cayman Islands with Dirck de Ruyter intending to hunt turtles. During this time, they attacked Spanish shipping along the Florida Channel and western Cuba.
