= Rio Branco Palace =

- Palácio Rio Branco
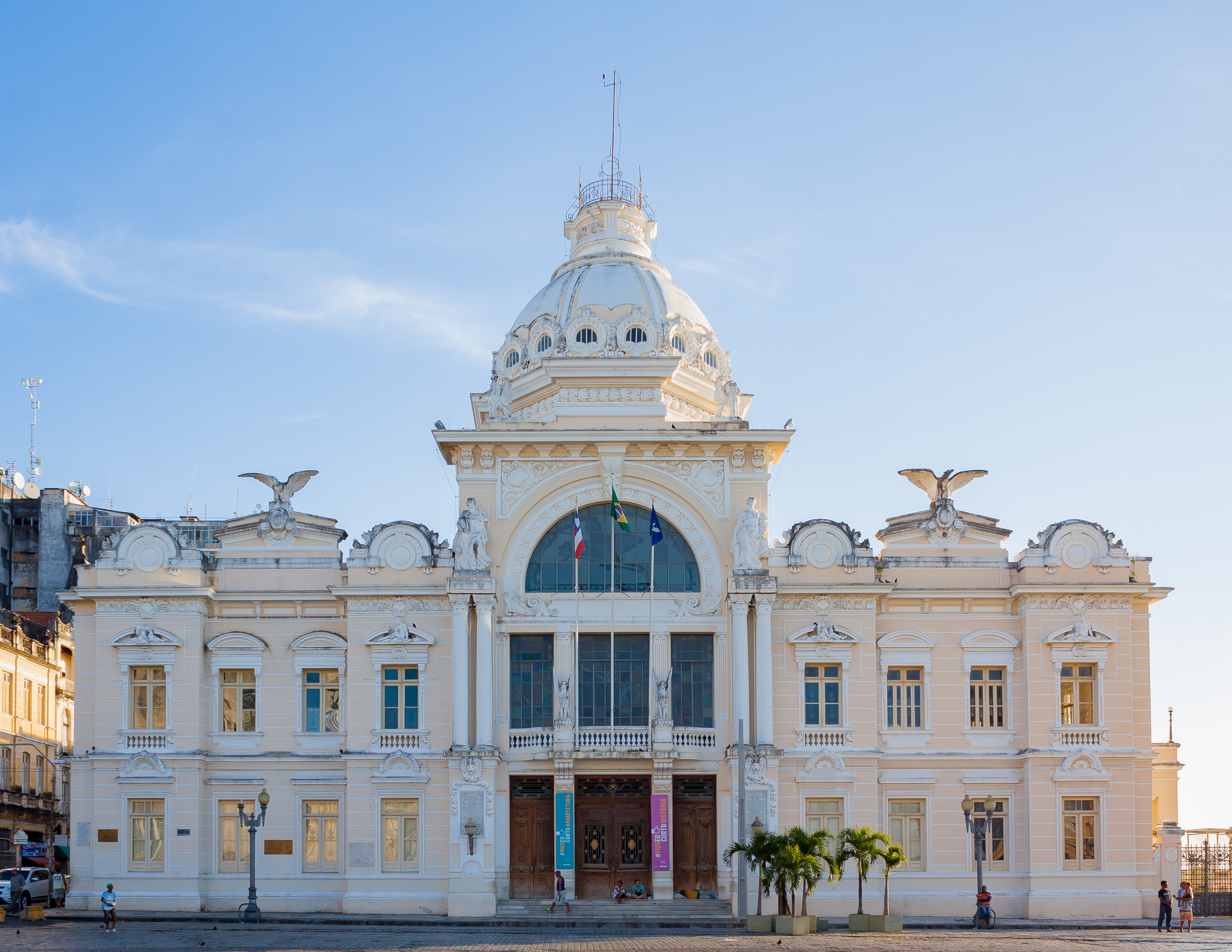
- Rio Branco Palace in Salvador, Bahia

- Location within Brazil

General information
- Type: Museum
- Location: Salvador, Bahia, Brazil
- Coordinates: 12.975883°S 38.511763°W
- Opened: 1549

The Rio Branco Palace (Portuguese: Palácio Rio Branco) is a palace and former seat of government in Salvador, Bahia, Brazil. It is one of the oldest palaces in Brazil and dates to 1549. It is located within the UNESCO World Heritage Site of the Historic Center of Salvador.

== History ==
Construction of the palace began in the mid-16th century under Tomé de Sousa, the first governor-general of Brazil, to be used as the center of Portuguese administration. It was later used as a military barracks and prison. It housed Dom Pedro II during his tour of Bahia in 1859. The palace was significantly renovated in 1900 under Luís Viana, Governor of Bahia between 1896 and 1900. It was bombed on January 10, 1912, during the attack of the city of Salvador, under the command of President Hermes da Fonseca. The building suffered significant damage and its rich collection of rare books was completely destroyed.

== Reconstruction and renovation ==
Reconstruction of the palace began under Governor Antônio Muniz Sodré de Aragão in 1919. The renovated palace was named "Rio Branco" in honor of the Brazilian statesman José Paranhos, Baron of Rio Branco. In this renovation the palace received its ornate Neoclassical façade. The palace was renovated again in 1984. It now houses the Pedro Calmon Foundation and the Memorial of the Governors.

== Structure ==
The Rio Branco Palace covers 4,500 square metres (48,000 ft^{2}).
