= Fernando de Mascarenhas =

Portuguese military and colonial administrator

His Lordship The Count of Torre
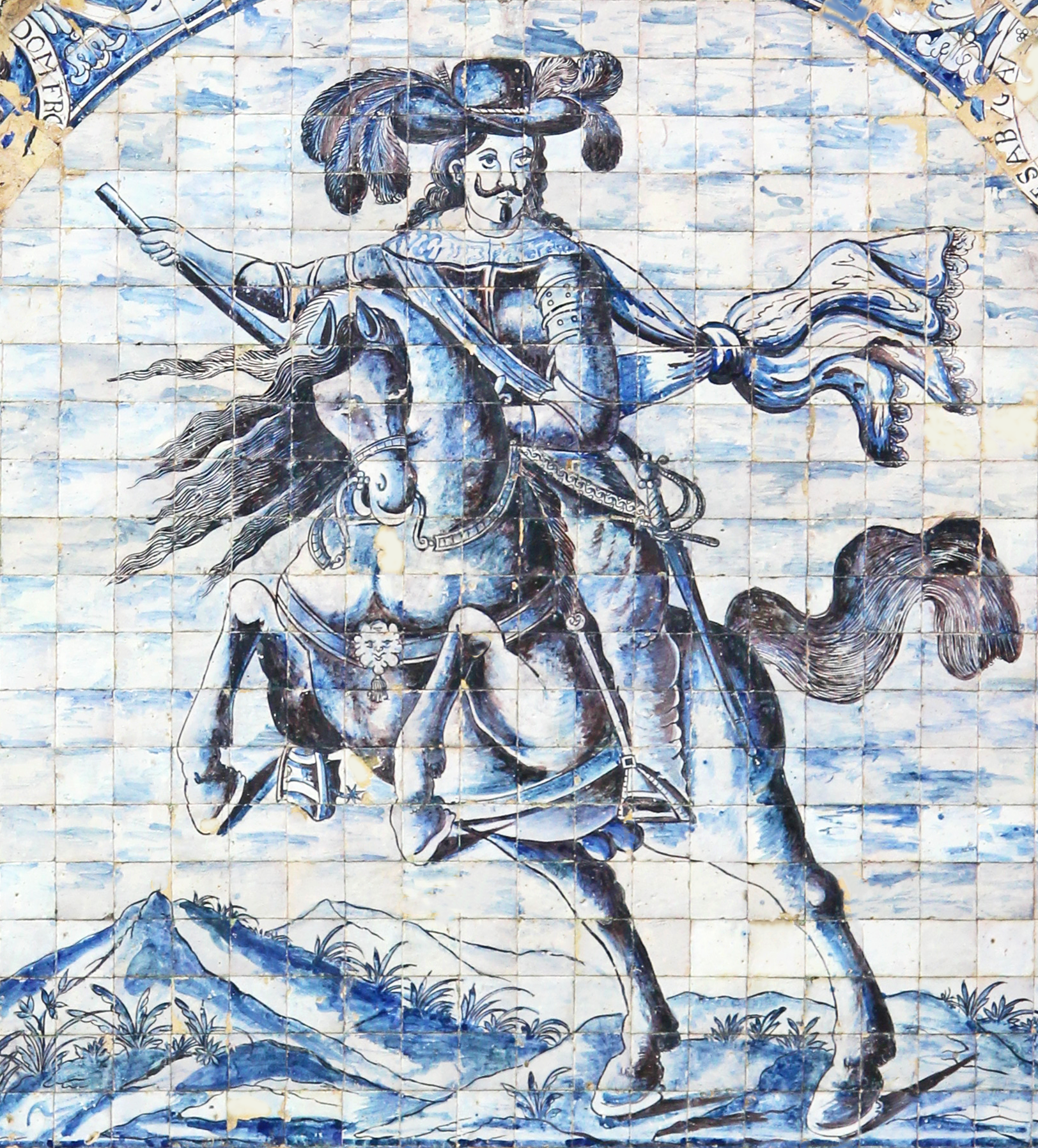

Personal details
- Born: c. 1610
- Died: 9 August 1651 (aged 40–41) Lisbon, Portugal

Fernando de Mascarenhas, 1st Count of Torre (c. 1610 – 9 August 1651) was a Portuguese military and colonial administrator who held the position of governor-general of Brazil from 20 January 1639 to 20 November 1639, appointed by King Philip III.

== Naval history / military service ==
Captain Mascarenhas participated in the naval battle of the action of 12–17 January 1640, leading 41 vessels in battle against the Dutch fleet led by Willem Loos. He mostly fought on behalf of the Spanish/Portuguese alliance. He died in Lisbon.
