= Jan Lichthart =

Dutch admiral

Jan Cornelisz Lichthart (died 30 November 1646), also known as Johan or Johannes Lichthart, was a Dutch admiral in the service of the Dutch West India Company. He distinguished himself as a buccaneer, attacking Spanish and Portuguese fleets and forts in the Caribbean and South America, particularly along the coast of present-day Brazil.

Lichthart, who had lived in Lisbon and spoke Portuguese, played a major part in the Dutch struggle against the Portuguese for possession of Brazil from 1630 onwards (see further Dutch Brazil). For instance, a squadron under his command conquered São Luis do Maranhão from the Portuguese in 1641. And at Tamandaré on September 9, 1645, a squadron under his command destroyed a Portuguese squadron under the command of Jerônimo Serrão de Paiva.

In 1630, he defeated a squadron of three Dunkirker ships following a pitched eight-hour battle.

He died on 30 November 1646 in Brazil, near the São Francisco River, after "drinking cold water when he was much heated."
