= Johan van Dorth =

Johan van Dorth (c. 1574 – 17 July 1624), schout of Lochem, Lord of Horst and Pesch, was a nobleman and general of the Dutch Republic.

== Biography ==
Van Dorth was the second son of Seino van Dorth (1536–1605), governor and landdrost of Zutphen, Lochem and Groenlo and Maria Droste van Senden. In 1602, he married Maria Adriana van Pallandt, by which he became lord of Horst and Pesch.

In 1624, the Dutch West India Company appointed him governor of Bahia early in the history of Dutch Brazil. He was killed by captain Francisco Padilha in an ambush before the Forte de Nossa Senhora de Monte Serrat.
