= List of paintings by Victor Meirelles =

Victor Meirelles was a Brazilian artist, who played an important role in the formation of painters in this genre in Brazil. He is considered to be one of the main exponents in the genre of historical painting.

This is a list of paintings by Victor Meirelles.

== List of paintings ==
Image	Title	Date	Material	Collection	Audible version
	Barão de Porto Alegre liderando as tropas em Curzu	1870			
	Abolição da Escravatura	1888	oil on canvas	Brasiliana Itaú Collection; Brasiliana Iconográfica	
	Naval Battle of Riachuelo	19th century	oil on canvas	Museu Histórico Nacional collection	
	Estrada para os Guararapes		watercolor paint	Museu Histórico Nacional collection	
	Passagem de Humaitá (1)	1870s	oil on canvas	Museu Histórico Nacional collection	
	Cabeça de guerreiro holandês (estudo)	1870s	oil on canvas	Museu Histórico Nacional collection	
	Guararapes Battle	19th century	oil on canvas	Museu Nacional de Belas Artes	
	Saint John the Baptist in prison	1852	oil on canvas	Museu Nacional de Belas Artes	
	The First Mass in Brazil	19th century	oil on canvas	Museu Nacional de Belas Artes	
	Head of a man		oil on canvas	Museu Victor Meirelles	
	Head of a man		oil on canvas	Museu Victor Meirelles	
	Head of a woman		oil on canvas	Museu Victor Meirelles	
	Head of an old man		oil on canvas	Museu Victor Meirelles	
	Study of the head of a girl	1856	oil on canvas	Museu Victor Meirelles	
	Portrait of a lady	1870	oil on canvas	Museu Victor Meirelles	
	Vista parcial da cidade de Nossa Senhora do Desterro 03	1851; 1847	oil on canvas	Museu Victor Meirelles	
	Vista parcial da cidade de Nossa Senhora do Desterro 02	1846	gouache paint paper graphite watercolor paint	Museu Victor Meirelles	
	Vista parcial da cidade de Nossa Senhora do Desterro	1846	watercolor paint paper	Museu Victor Meirelles	
	A morta			Museu Victor Meirelles	
	Brasil (estudo de embarcação)			Museu Victor Meirelles	
	Cabeça de homem			Museu Victor Meirelles	
	Cristo sobre as ondas			Museu Victor Meirelles	
	Degolação de São João Batista	1855	oil on canvas	Museu Victor Meirelles	
	Esboceto para "Batalha dos Guararapes"	1876		Museu Victor Meirelles	
	Esboço de paisagem para "Passagem do Humaitá"	1870	oil on canvas	Museu Victor Meirelles	
	Esboço para "Batalha dos Guararapes"	1876	pencil paper	Museu Victor Meirelles	
	Estudo de detalhe de embarcação			Museu Victor Meirelles	
	Estudo de embarcação			Museu Victor Meirelles	
	Estudo de Mastros de embarcação			Museu Victor Meirelles	
	Estudo de paisagem		pencil paper	Museu Victor Meirelles	
	Estudo de Panejamento	1856	pencil paper	Museu Victor Meirelles	
	Estudo de proa de embarcação			Museu Victor Meirelles	
	Estudo de proa de embarcação			Museu Victor Meirelles	
	Estudo de traje	1854	watercolor paint paper	Museu Victor Meirelles	
	Estudo dos tipos populares	1855	pencil paper	Museu Victor Meirelles	
	Estudo para "Batalha dos Guararapes"	1876	pencil paper	Museu Victor Meirelles	
	Estudo para "Batalha dos Guararapes" (Felipe Camarão)	1876	oil on canvas	Museu Victor Meirelles	
	Estudo para "Batalha dos Guararapes" (guerreiro holandês caído)	1876		Museu Victor Meirelles	
	Estudo para "Batalha Naval do Riachuelo"	1872		Museu Victor Meirelles	
	Estudo para "Casamento da Princesa Isabel"	1864		Museu Victor Meirelles	
	Estudo para "Invocação à Virgem"	1898	oil paint cardboard	Museu Victor Meirelles	
	Estudo para "Passagem do Humaitá"	19th century	oil paint panel	Museu Victor Meirelles	
	Estudo para "Primeira Missa no Brasil"	1860	pencil paper	Museu Victor Meirelles	
	Estudo para "Primeira missa no Brasil" (mãos)	1860	pencil paper	Museu Victor Meirelles	
	Estudo para retrato		pencil paper	Museu Victor Meirelles	
	Le Radeau de la Meduse (O Naufrágio da Medusa)	1858	oil paint paper	Museu Victor Meirelles	
	Magé (estudo de embarcação)			Museu Victor Meirelles	
	Mulheres suliotas	1857	oil on canvas	Museu Victor Meirelles	
	Niterói (estudo de proa de embarcação)			Museu Victor Meirelles	
	Vapor Amazonas (estudo de proa de embarcação)			Museu Victor Meirelles	
	Vista de Ronciglione	1855	pencil paper	Museu Victor Meirelles	
	Vista parcial da cidade de Nossa Senhora do Desterro (atual Q132997)	1849	watercolor paint paper	Museu Victor Meirelles	
	Estudo de embarcação 02			Museu Victor Meirelles	
	Estudo de embarcação 03			Museu Victor Meirelles	
	Estudo de Panejamento 02	1856	pencil paper	Museu Victor Meirelles	
	Estudo de Panejamento 03	1856		Museu Victor Meirelles	
	Estudo de Panejamento 07	1856	oil paint paper	Museu Victor Meirelles	
	Estudo de Panejamento 08	1856	watercolor paint paper	Museu Victor Meirelles	
	Estudo de Panejamento 09	1856	oil paint paper	Museu Victor Meirelles	
	Estudo de Panejamento 10	1856	watercolor paint	Museu Victor Meirelles	
	Estudo de Panejamento 11	1856	watercolor paint paper	Museu Victor Meirelles	
	Estudo de Panejamento 12	1856	watercolor paint paper	Museu Victor Meirelles	
	Estudo de Panejamento 13	1856	oil paint paper	Museu Victor Meirelles	
	Estudo de Panejamento 14	1856	watercolor paint paper	Museu Victor Meirelles	
	Estudo de Panejamento 15	1856	watercolor paint paper	Museu Victor Meirelles	
	Estudo de Panejamento 16	1856	watercolor paint paper	Museu Victor Meirelles	
	Estudo de Panejamento 17	1856	paper watercolor paint	Museu Victor Meirelles	
	Estudo de Panejamento 18	1856	watercolor paint paper	Museu Victor Meirelles	
	Estudo de Panejamento 19	1856	watercolor paint paper	Museu Victor Meirelles	
	Estudo de Panejamento 20	1856	oil paint paper	Museu Victor Meirelles	
	Estudo de Panejamento 21	1856	watercolor paint paper	Museu Victor Meirelles	
	Estudo de Panejamento 22	1856	watercolor paint paper	Museu Victor Meirelles	
	Estudo de Panejamento 23	1856	watercolor paint paper	Museu Victor Meirelles	
	Estudo de Panejamento 24	1856	oil paint cardboard	Museu Victor Meirelles	
	Estudo de Panejamento 25	1856	watercolor paint paper	Museu Victor Meirelles	
	Estudo para "Batalha dos Guararapes" 02	1879	pencil paper	Museu Victor Meirelles	
	Estudo para "Batalha dos Guararapes" 03	1876	pencil paper	Museu Victor Meirelles	
	Estudo para "Batalha dos Guararapes" 04	1876	wax crayon paper	Museu Victor Meirelles	
	Estudo para "Batalha dos Guararapes" 05	1876	pencil paper	Museu Victor Meirelles	
	Estudo para "Passagem do Humaitá" 08			Museu Victor Meirelles	
	Estudo para retrato 11		pencil paper	Museu Victor Meirelles	
	Sem título 05	1852	wax crayon paper	Museu Victor Meirelles	
	Sem título 08	1856		Museu Victor Meirelles	
	Study for a portrait		pencil paper	Museu Victor Meirelles	
	Study for "The First Mass in Brazil"	19th century	oil paint paper	Museu Victor Meirelles	
	Head of an old man	1865	oil paint cardboard	Museu Victor Meirelles	
	Study for "Naval Combat of Riachuelo"	1871	pencil paper	Museu Victor Meirelles	
	Study of Italian clothes	1854	watercolor pain' paper	Museu Victor Meirelles	
	Study for "The Battle of Guararapes"	1870s	oil on canvas	Museu Victor Meirelles	
	Passagem de Humaitá	1872	oil on canvas	National Historical Museum	
	Passagem do Humaitá	1886	gouache paint	Pinacoteca do Estado de São Paulo	
	Moema	1866	oil on canvas	São Paulo Museum of Art	
	Portrait of the Doctor José Maria Chaves	1873	oil paint duck	São Paulo Museum of Art	
	Pedro II of Brazil	1864	oil on canvas	São Paulo Museum of Art	
	Portrait of Teresa Cristina of the Two Sicilies	1864	oil on canvas	São Paulo Museum of Art	
