= Victor Meirelles =

Brazilian painter (1832–1903)

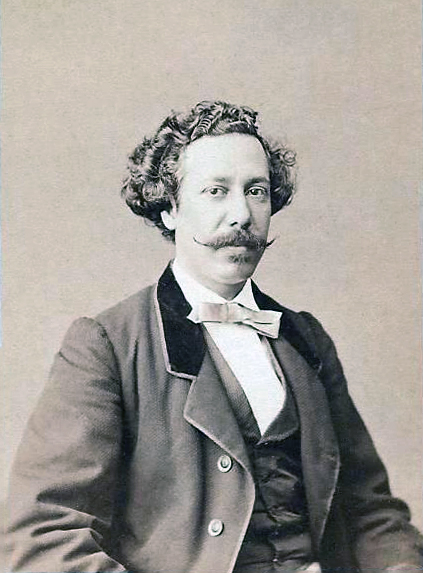
- Meirelles, 1860s
- Born: 18 August 1832; Florianópolis, Empire of Brazil
- Died: 22 February 1903 (aged 70); Rio de Janeiro, Federal District, Brazil
- Education: Imperial Academy of Fine Arts
- Known for: Painting
- Notable work: Primeira Missa no Brasil; Moema; Batalha dos Guararapes; Combate Naval do Riachuelo
- Movement: Romanticism; Academicism

Victor Meirelles de Lima (18 August 1832 – 22 February 1903) was a Brazilian painter and teacher who is best known for his works relating to his nation's culture and history. From humble origins, his talent was soon recognized, being admitted as a student at the Imperial Academy of Fine Arts. He specialized in the genre of history painting, and upon winning the Academy's Foreign Travel Award, he spent several years training in Europe. There he painted his best-known work, Primeira Missa no Brasil. Returning to Brazil, he became one of emperor Pedro II's favorite painters, joining the monarch's patronage program and aligning himself with his proposal to renew the image of Brazil through the creation of visual symbols of its history.

He became an esteemed teacher at the Academy, forming a generation of painters, and continued his personal work by performing other important historical paintings, such as Batalha dos Guararapes, Moema and Combate Naval do Riachuelo, as well as portraits and landscapes, of which the Retrato de Dom Pedro II and his three Panoramas stand out. In his heyday he was considered one of the leading artists of the second reign, often receiving high praise for the perfection of his technique, the nobility of his inspiration and the general quality of his monumental compositions, as well as his unblemished character and tireless dedication to his craft. Meirelles got many admirers both in Brazil and abroad. He received imperial decorations and was the first Brazilian painter to win admission to the Paris Salon, but was also the target of scathing criticism, arousing strong controversies in a period when disputes between academic painters and the early modernists were ignited. With the advent of the Republic in Brazil, for being too linked to the Imperial government, he fell into ostracism, and ended his life in precarious financial conditions, already much forgotten.

“Meirelles’ work is rooted in the Brazilian academic tradition, characterized by an eclectic synthesis of neoclassical, romantic, and realist influences, while also reflecting Baroque and Nazarene elements. After a period of relative obscurity, contemporary criticism has recognized him as a forerunner of modern Brazilian painting and one of the foremost 19th-century Brazilian painters. He is widely regarded as the greatest of his era, creating some of the most celebrated visual interpretations of Brazilian history, which continue to resonate in the country’s culture and are frequently reproduced in school textbooks and other media.

He is the Patron of the 6th chair of the Brazilian Academy of Fine Arts.

== Biography ==
=== Early life ===
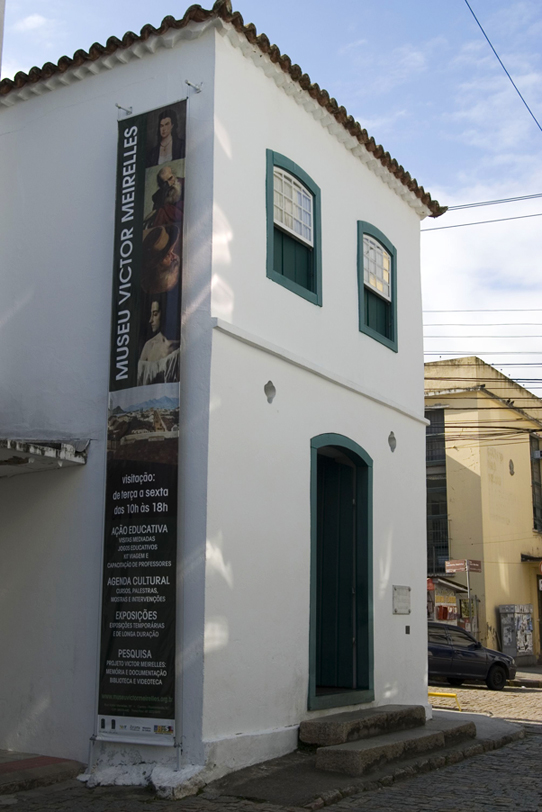
The house where Meirelles was born, today the Victor Meirelles Museum

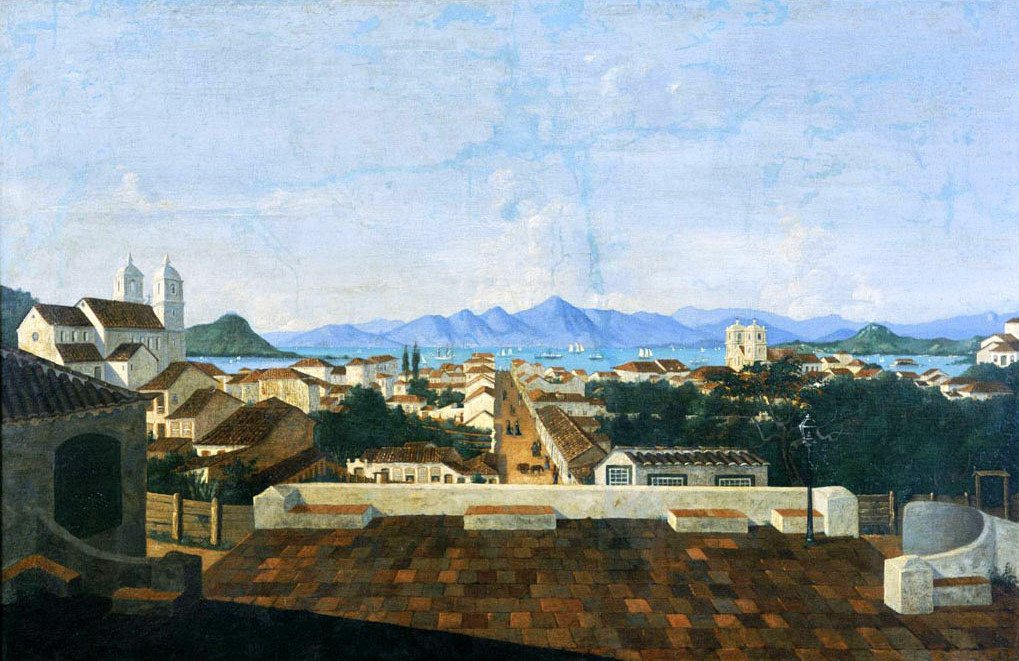
View of Desterro, 1847. Victor Meirelles Museum

His early years are obscure and the few sources provide conflicting information. Victor Meirelles de Lima was the son of Portuguese immigrant Antônio Meirelles de Lima and Brazilian Maria da Conceição dos Prazeres, merchants who lived with limited economic resources in the city of Nossa Senhora do Desterro (now Florianópolis). He had a brother, Virgílio. According to records, at the age of five he began to be educated in Latin, Portuguese and arithmetic, but he spent his free time drawing dolls and landscapes from his island of Santa Catarina and copying other people's images that he found in engravings and pamphlets. According to the testimony of José Arthur Boiteux:

"At the age of five, his parents sent him to the Royal School and he was so young that the teacher, to better give him lessons, would sit him on his knees. When he returned home, his hobby was the old Cosmorama that Antônio Meirelles had bought for very cheap, and so curious that he [the boy] was, he [Antônio] always fixed some of the pieces when his son broke them, which was common. At the age of ten, Victor did not escape lithograph prints: as many as he could get his hands on, he copied them all. Whoever passed by Rua da Pedreira, old Quartéis Velhos, on the corner of Rua da Conceição, at late afternoon, would invariably see the little one leaning over the counter making scribbles, if not the caricatures of the customers themselves who at that hour would gather there for the unfailing two prose fingers".

In 1843, when he was between 10 and 11 years old, Meirelles began to receive instruction from Father Joaquim Gomes d’Oliveira e Paiva, who taught him French and philosophy and deepened his knowledge of Latin. His precocious talent was noticed and encouraged by his family and local authorities, and in 1845 he began to take regular classes with a professor of geometric design, Argentine engineer Mariano Moreno, who was a doctor of law and theology, as well as a journalist, politician and former secretary of the first Government Board of the United Provinces of the Río de la Plata, playing, according to Teresinha Franz, "an important role in the construction of the Argentine identity". At the same time, Meirelles probably completed his general studies at the Jesuit College, which taught classes in Latin, French, philosophy, elementary history, geography, rhetoric, and geometry, and it is possible that he came into contact with traveling artists who documented nature and the local people.

Some of his drawings were seen and appreciated by Jerônimo Coelho, counselor of the Empire of Brazil, who showed them to the then director of the Imperial Academy of Fine Arts, Félix-Émile Taunay. The director immediately accepted Meirelles, then only aged fourteen, as a student at the institution. Moving to Rio de Janeiro in 1847, Meirelles started to attend a drawing course, having the initial expenses financed by a group of patrons and being a student of Manuel Joaquim de Melo Corte Real, Joaquim Inácio da Costa Miranda and José Correia de Lima, who had studied with the classicist Debret. The following year he won a gold medal and a little later he returned to his hometown to visit his parents. The first of his known works date from this period. In 1849 he was back in Rio de Janeiro, studying at the Academy, among others, the discipline of historical painting, a genre in which he had his greatest successes. It is said that Meirelles was a brilliant student, excelling in all subjects. In 1852 he won the Travel to Europe Prize with his painting Saint John the Baptist in Prison.

=== Studies in Europe ===
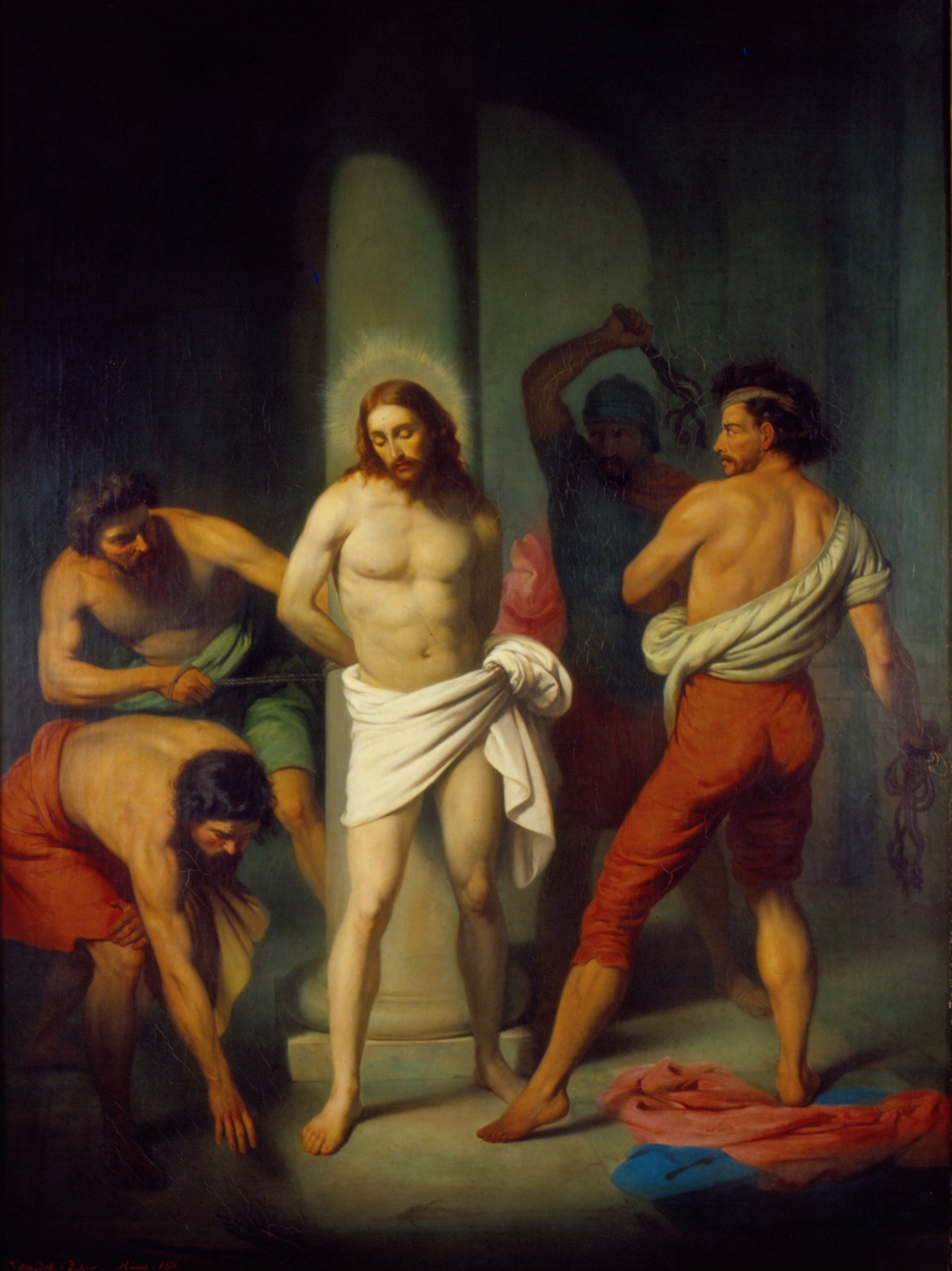
The Flagellation of Christ, 1856. A canvas made during his period as a fellow at the Academy in Europe, which earned him an extension of his scholarship. National Museum of Fine Arts

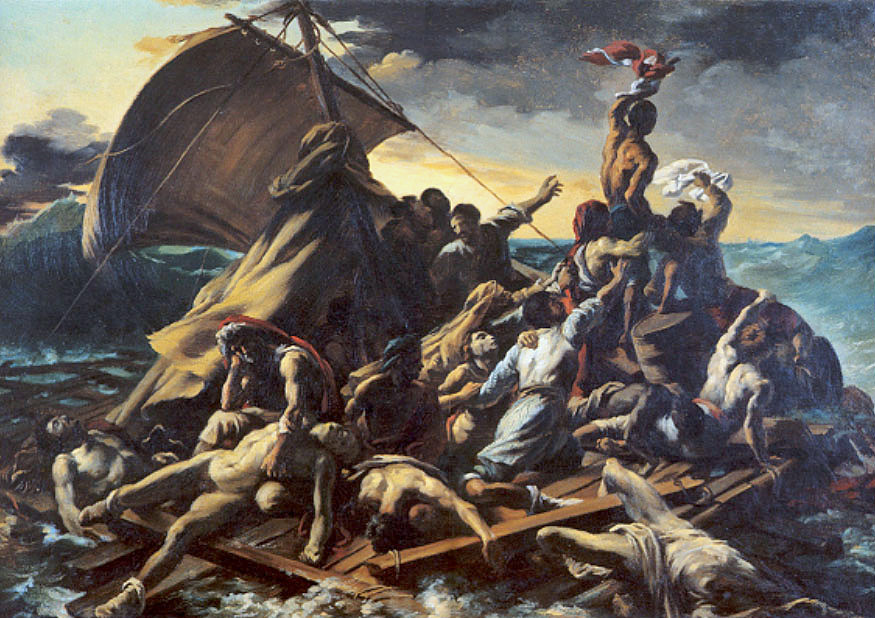
The Shipwreck of Medusa, c. 1857-1858, copy of original by Théodore Géricault. Victor Meirelles Museum

In June 1853, at the age of 21, Meirelles landed in Le Havre, France. He passed briefly through Paris and then settled in Rome, his original destination. There he met two other students from the Academy who were also improving, Agostinho da Mota and Jean Leon Pallière, who introduced Meirelles to the artistic environment of the city and guided him on which masters he should look for. At first he entered the class of Tommaso Minardi, who, despite his fame, followed an excessively austere method, where the students remained excessively subordinated to the precepts, without the opportunity to develop their own ideas. Then he dropped out of class and enrolled in the atelier of Nicola Consoni, a member of the Accademia di San Luca. Consoni was also rigorous, but Meirelles made good use of the live model sessions, essential for the refinement of anatomical drawing, an essential element in the genre of historical painting, the most prestigious in the academic system. At the same time, he practiced in watercolor and came into contact with the vast collection of ancient art in the Italian capital. In a second stage, he moved to Florence, getting to know the local museums and being strongly impressed by the art of Veronese. As a study, he copied works by the master, as well as other outstanding figures, such as Titian, Tintoretto and Lorenzo Lotto. As required by the Academy, he regularly sent his works and copies to Brazil as proof of his progress. His performance was so good that the Brazilian government decided to renew his scholarship for another three years in 1856, in addition to indicating to the artist a list of new specific studies that he should complete.

Thus, in 1856 he went to Milan and soon after to Paris. He tried, on the recommendation of Araújo Porto-Alegre, at the time director of the Academy and his main mentor, to be admitted as a student of Paul Delaroche, but the master suddenly died, so he had to look for another direction, finding it in Léon Cogniet, an equally celebrated romantic painter, member of the École des Beaux-Arts and a reference for foreigners who were going to study in Europe. He then studied with André Gastaldi, who was almost the same age as Meirelles, but who had a more advanced view of art and gave him important instruction in colors. His routine, according to reports, was almost monastic, devoting himself entirely to art, and again his studies were considered so good that his scholarship was extended again for another two years. At that time, his production was numerous, standing out among all his works A Primeira Missa no Brasil, executed between 1858 and 1861, which earned him space and praise at the prestigious Paris Salon of 1861, an unprecedented feat for Brazilian artists that had a very positive impact in his homeland.

=== Return to Brazil and fame ===
In the same year his scholarship ended and he had to return, already feted like a genius. He exhibited A Primeira Missa no Brasil and, among many honors, received from emperor Pedro II the Imperial Order of the Rose in the rank of knight. Soon after, he traveled to Santa Catarina to visit his mother — his father had died while he was in Europe. He stayed there for some time and returned to Rio de Janeiro, where he was appointed Honorary Professor of the Academy, being promoted shortly after to Interim Professor, and later assuming the chair of historical painting. Testimonies from students declare their respect for Meirelles, attesting to his impeccable character and his dedication to teaching, being considered an attentive, patient teacher and truly interested in the progress of his disciples. His fame was consolidated and from this time dates the work Moema, one of the best known works of Brazilian indianism, but in its first exhibition it did not attract interest. Nevertheless, Meirelles received commissions from the imperial family, painting the Wedding of Princess Isabel and a portrait of the emperor in 1864, as well as portraits of members of the nobility and politicians. In 1864 he received the habit of the Order of Christ. He also became known for his devotion to national causes, which is why he was hired in 1868 by the imperial government to paint about the Paraguayan War, which was in full swing, in a contract that both honored him and gave him good remuneration.

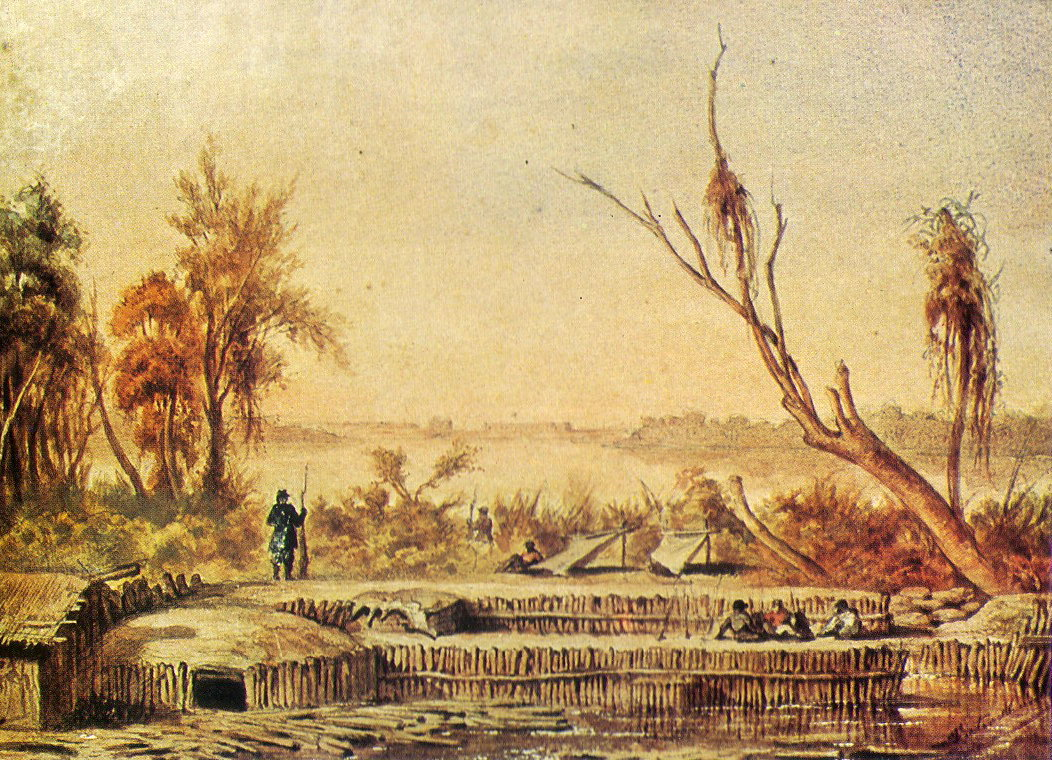
Aspect of the Paraguayan War, watercolor, c. 1868-1870. São Paulo Picture Gallery

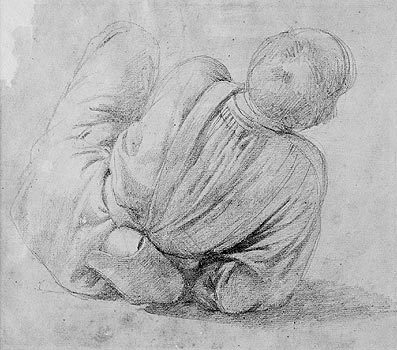
Study for the Naval Battle of Riachuelo, Victor Meirelles Museum

Immediately Meirelles moved to the conflict region to gather impressions of the landscape and the military environment. He set up a workshop aboard the ship Brasil, the flagship of the Brazilian fleet, and spent months there drawing up sketches for his works. Returning to Rio de Janeiro, he took up a space at the Santo Antônio Convent, which he turned into a studio, and put himself to work diligently, isolating himself from the world. This effort resulted in two of his most important works, both of great dimensions: Passagem de Humaitá and Combate Naval de Riachuelo. While he was working on these paintings, he received a visit from the imperial family, with whom he had contact, which resulted in new paintings and the sending of Combate Naval de Riachuelo to represent Brazil at an international fair held in the United States. Upon returning from the exhibition, the work was damaged.

In 1871 he painted Juramento da Princesa Regente, the following year he was appointed commander of the Order of the Rose, and in 1875 he began the sketches for another great historical work, Batalha dos Guararapes, accepting a project that had been refused by Pedro Américo, who preferred work on his Batalha de Avaí. As he had done before, Meirelles went to the region where the conflict had taken place to conceive the composition with greater historical accuracy. The two battle paintings were exhibited at the Salon of 1879 and both artists received the Grand Prix and the title of dignitaries of the Order of the Rose, but it triggered the greatest aesthetic controversy that had hitherto taken place in Brazil. While some recognized their superlative abilities, hailing them as geniuses and heroes, others accused them of plagiarism and passé. At the same time, two parties were formed, one supporting Meirelles and the other Américo, in the dispute over which of the battle painting was more perfect. The lay public also got involved and the discussion took over the newspapers and magazines for months. Despite receiving much applause, the also numerous criticisms struck Meirelles deeply, throwing him into a state of melancholy tha apparently accompanied him until the end of his life.

In 1883 Meirelles was back in Europe, where he made a new version of Combate Naval de Riachuelo, which had been lost, and in Belgium he began, in 1885, to paint the Panorama do Rio de Janeiro, a view taken from the Santo Antônio hill. For this, he had the help of Henri Langerock, founding with him a panorama company, a genre that was quickly becoming popular in various techniques and could mean a good profit for artists through the collection of tickets for visitation. In 1887 the painting was exhibited in Brussels, making use of a rotating cylinder that allowed spectators to contemplate the views in 360 degrees. The work was inaugurated in the presence of the Belgian royal family and a large body of nobles and authorities, being visited by about 50 thousand people, with great repercussion in the press. By this time his partnership with Langerock was broken, who sued him for alleged financial losses, but the case was decided in Meirelles's favor. In 1889 the panorama was exhibited at the 1889 Exposition Universelle, where it received a gold medal and more praise from the press and the public, but due to a failure in the event's programming and the competition of many other attractions, including panoramas by other artists, its visitation was little expressive.

=== Last years ===
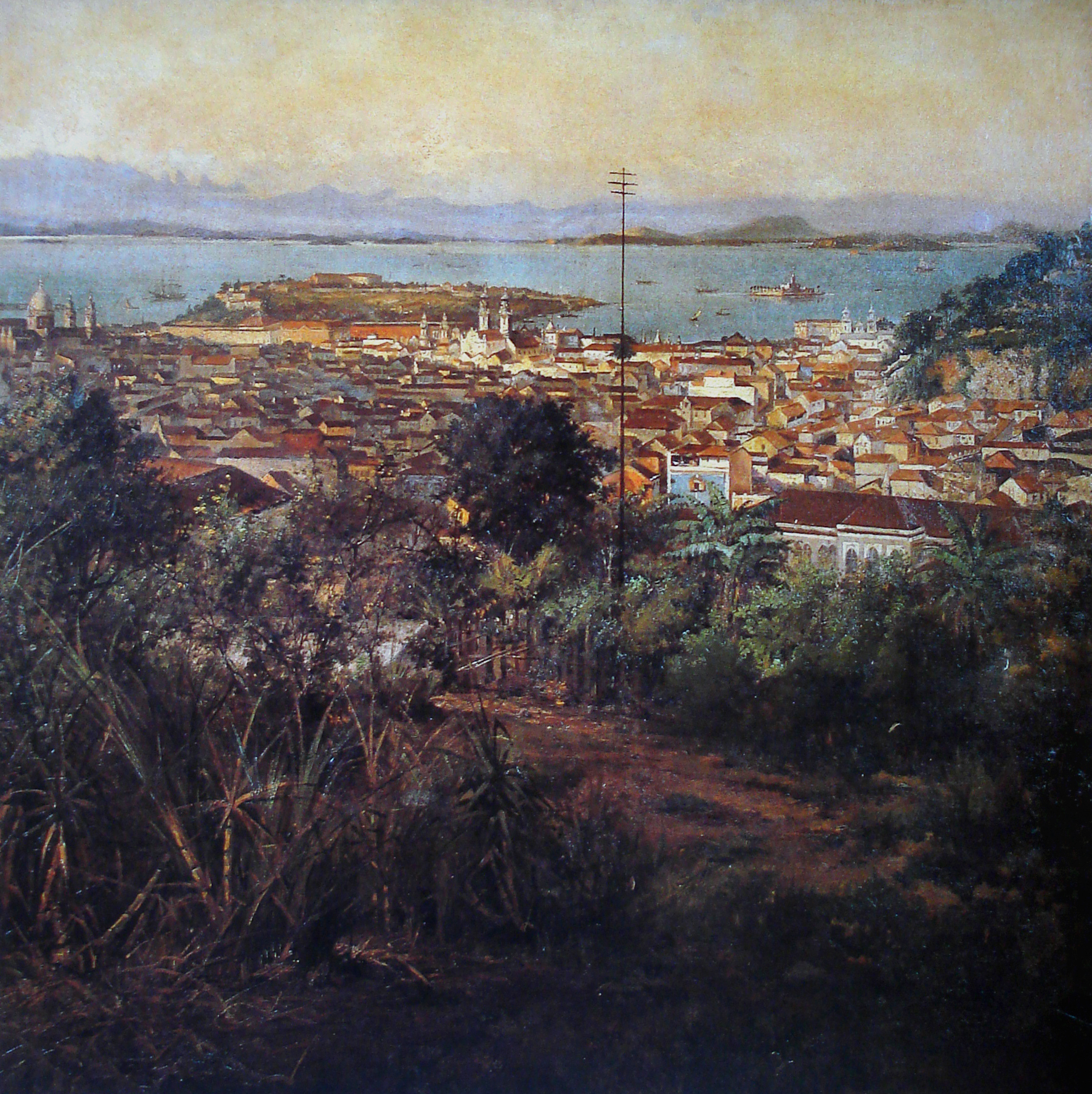
Study for the Panorama of Rio de Janeiro - Ilha das Cobras and Morro de Santo Antônio, c. 1885. National Museum of Fine Arts

In 1889, with the Proclamation of the Republic in Brazil, the official artists of the monarchy were politically persecuted and in 1890 Meirelles was early dismissed from the Imperial Academy, now transformed into the National School of Fine Arts. At just 57 years old, it was claimed he was too old. For a year he managed to get a position as a teacher at the Lyceum of Arts and Crafts, but from 1891, once again unemployed, he installed his Panorama do Rio in a rotunda specially built for him in the square of the Imperial Palace, where he charged a thousand réis per visitor. According to reports of the time, in its first year of exhibition, the work was visited by about 70,000 people, but this may be advertising exaggeration. A little later, Meirelles gave free access to schoolchildren and offered detailed teaching materials to complement the work. In 1893 the government sent a representation to the World's Columbian Exposition, where Primeira Missa no Brasil and the Panorama of Rio were exhibited with great success. In the same year he founded a painting school with Décio Villares and Eduardo de Sá, but classes ended after a few months.

His second panoramic composition appeared in 1896, a vast landscape measuring 115 meters wide by 14.5 meters high, depicting the entrance of the loyalist fleet in Guanabara Bay, an episode of the Armada Revolt of 1894, which he carried out practically without any assistance both in the painting and in the administrative tasks of the exposition, contacts and sponsorship searches. Without a steady job, tired and living basically on the income from visits to his panoramas, Meirelles got into serious financial difficulties when the government demanded, in 1898, that he dismantle the rotunda, after which he survived on the help of friends. In 1900, his Panorama do Descobrimento do Brasil, still unfinished, was shown in the exhibition of the Fourth Centenary of Brazil's Discovery, as the last attempt to revive his career, as mentioned by Mário Coelho. The exhibition was inaugurated in the presence of president Campos Sales, who described the work as extraordinary. He set up another exhibition pavilion on a farm in the former São José Seminary, at the back of the Carmo Convent, but the panoramas were no longer new and attracted fewer and fewer people. Meirelles still had the idea of exhibiting them in Europe again, trying to gain the government's interest, but the plan came to nothing. The artist ended up donating the paintings to the National Museum, as well as many drawings and studies, but they were damaged and lost years later through the institution's negligence.

Disappointed, poor and abandoned, on the morning of a Carnival Sunday, on 22 February 1903, Victor Meirelles died at the age of 71, in the simple house where he lived. The artist was married to Rosália Fraga, who already had a son from a previous marriage, whom Meirelles adopted, but he left no direct descendants and nothing is known about his private life. His widow donated her estate to the National School of Fine Arts, which held a posthumous exhibition in Meirelles honor. The widow died shortly afterwards, in the same year.

According to Carlos Rubens, his biographer, shortly before Meirelles death he would have told a friend and former disciple that if he had another chance he would make his life take other paths, to which the friend replied: "And what other paths would take you to the First Mass?" As history shows, Meirelles current fame rests mainly on this composition.

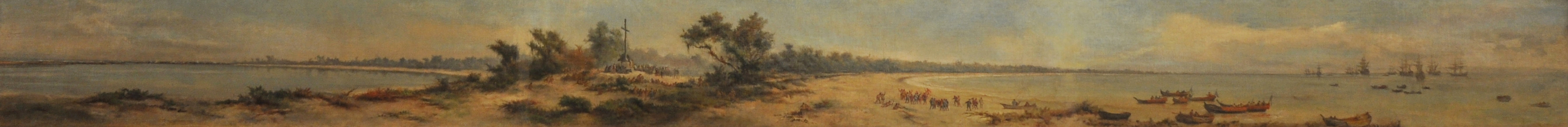
Estudo para o Panorama do Descobrimento do Brasil, 1893. National Museum of Fine Arts

== Works ==
=== Context and style ===
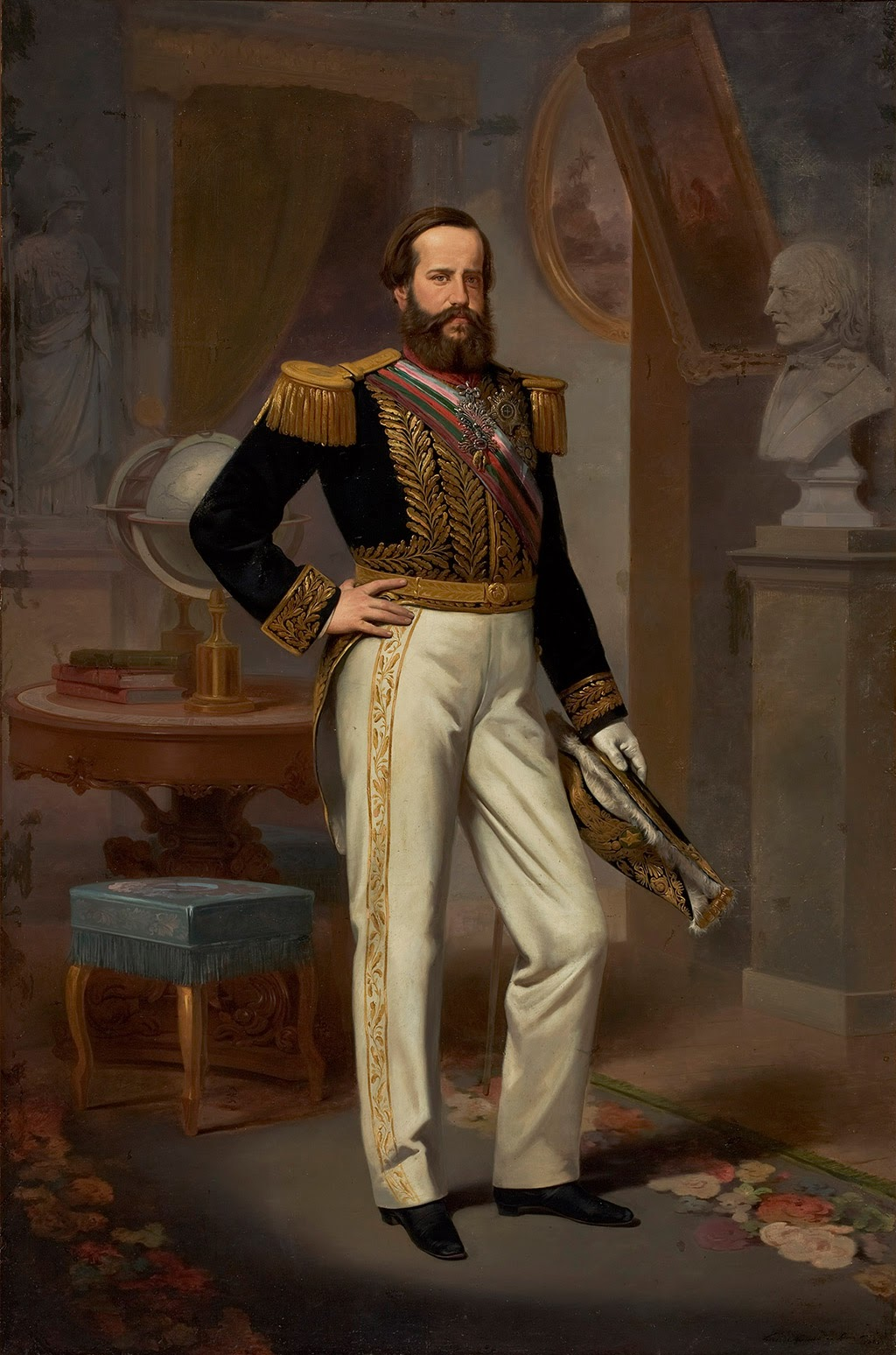
Portrait of Dom Pedro II, 1864. São Paulo Museum of Art

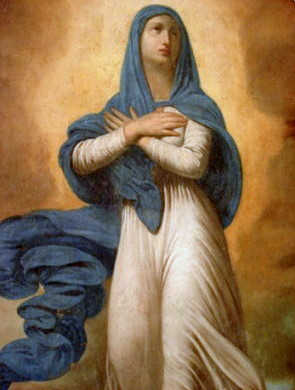
Nossa Senhora da Conceição, 1856. Santo Antônio dos Anjos Church, Laguna

Victor Meirelles flourished at a critical moment in Brazilian history. Independent for few years, the country sought to consolidate its position among the great nations through a modernization program, in which a nationalist motivation was obvious and where support for the arts was indispensable as a proof and propaganda of the progress achieved as a cultured civilization and as a regional military power. But at the time, a symbolic imagery capable of bringing together the forces of the people and the elites around a sense of national identity had not yet been formed. In this construction, which was orchestrated by the government, the role of painters such as Victor Meirelles was essential.

The Imperial Academy, where Meirelles was educated, was one of the executive arms of this civilizing program, which also sought to move away from the memory of colonial times under Portuguese rule through affiliation to other models of culture, such as France and Italy, where many painters were sent to improve their skills. At the same time that, in cultural terms, dependence on foreign inspiration remained inescapable, typically Brazilian elements that had previously been disowned, such as the indigenous peoples, began to be reintegrated, praised and merged with European references as part of the local roots necessary for the legitimation of national culture, in a synthesis not devoid of contradictions. Teresa Franz wrote that:

"There was no clear awareness of the difficulties of transposing to Brazil, a country in formation, models imported from countries like France. Brazil was made up of a society little culturally and artistically complex, whose intellectual elite, seduced by European culture, could not see at which point it became problematic for this culture to take root and develop freely in a still growing society."

Symptomatic of the intentionality and, in a certain way, artificiality of this nationalism invented by the elites, were the circumstances of the elaboration of the first masterpiece by Victor Meirelles, Primeira Missa no Brasil. During its creation Meirelles kept in contact by correspondence with the then director of the Academy, Manuel de Araújo Porto-Alegre, who served as spokesperson for the official ideology and led the painter's work in various aspects, which happened throughout his entire student period. It was in the Sainte-Geneviève Library, in Paris, that Meirelles found material for studying Brazilian amerindians, and not in Brazil, where the indigenous peoples had long been driven to remote regions, decimated or acculturated. There he studied the documentation and ethnographic records about the natives left by naturalists, and it was there that he came into contact with the letter of Pero Vaz de Caminha, which would inspire the backdrop for his creation.

Victor Meirelles developed an eclectic style, and it has been difficult for recent critics to agree on his exact characterization. During his period of study, he came into contact with the entire tradition of Western painting, absorbing references from the Renaissance, which included, for example, Raphael and Giuseppe Cesari, from the Baroque of Titian and Tintoretto and from neoclassicals and romantics such as Cogniet, Vernet, Delaroche and Delacroix. From all these schools Meirelles collected subsidies for the formation of his personal style. An especially significant influence in the idealist sense, in his formative period, was the contact with the production of the Nazarene group, through Johann Friedrich Overbeck and his teachers Tommaso Minardi and Nicola Consoni. The Nazarenes advocated an attitude of purity expressed in an exemplary life and in painting focused on noble themes, where religion played a central role. Meirelles did not become famous for his religious works, which are few, conservative and of secondary importance, and even though he was personally a devout Catholic, he was artistically committed to the proposal of a secular and progressive society, where art had an important civic and pedagogical role to fulfill, but the group's ideals of purity, unblemished life and hard and honest work left their marks on Meirelles personality and work.

His classicism can be seen in the general harmony of the compositions, in its placid character, in its interpretation of nature loaded with poetry, and even when it comes to battles, the impression of movement and violence, which would be expected for such a theme, is in the background, and what stands out is the balanced organization of the set, as the author himself recognized, largely canceling the effect of drama. It is significant that Meirelles used very few of his numerous sketches depicting the most violent and desolate aspects of the battles when he produced the definitive works, but a piece like Passagem de Humaitá could hardly fit into the classic profile, with a drama aspect marked by several authors, such as Carlos Rubens, who considered it a true vision of hell. Even Combate Naval do Riachuelo, which differs greatly from the other in the dramatic aspect, was called a "phantasmagorical allegory" by Mário César Coelho.

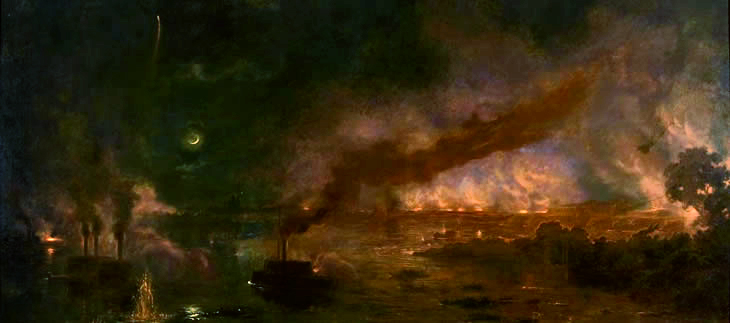
Detail of Passagem de Humaitá, 1868-72, depicting the Passage of Humaitá. National Historical Museum

In Meirelles time, Brazil was just emerging from the Baroque tradition, which was still alive in several places, but which since the beginning of the 19th century, under the influence of the neoclassical avant-garde sponsored by the Portuguese court and the French Mission, was already considered outdated by the elite. Even giving great importance to classical principles, the way he organized his compositions, with groups forming dynamic opposites, and the basically pictorial and non-graphic treatment of the painting, his taste for light effects, sfumato and "atmosphere", bring him closer to the Baroque and romantic style. The works he copied during his studies were basically by masters of these schools. This dialectic was very old, it was present within the European academies since the 17th century, when the dispute between the followers of Peter Paul Rubens and Nicolas Poussin arose, who defended the supremacy, respectively, of color over drawing, and of drawing over color. This dispute implied the primacy of reason, orthodoxy and purity of spirit, symbolized by drawing, or that of emotion, irrational intuition and sensualism, symbolized by color, which brought important moral associations in the context of the time. The controversy, in fact, was never resolved. For specialists such as Mario Barata and Lilia Schwarcz, Meirelles production fits more correctly into the eclectic romanticism typical of the second half of the 19th century, with its patriotic and idealistic associations and a certain sentimentality, a tendency that predominated in the period of Pedro II's maturity, and which coincided with the heyday of Brazilian academism. But Jorge Coli, speaking at the same time of Meirelles and Pedro Américo, observed that:

"It is better, therefore, to put aside the notions and question the works. This is evidently more difficult. If I say 'Victor Meirelles is romantic' or 'Pedro Américo is academic', I project on them knowledge, criteria and prejudices that give security to my spirit. If I go directly to the canvases, honestly and carefully, I find that they continually escape what I supposed to be their very nature and, what is worse, flee to unknown regions, not subject to the control of my knowledge. Thus, instead of discussing whether Meirelles or Américo are or are not classics, are or are not romantics, are or are not pre-modernists – which puts me in safe and comfortable parameters, but profoundly limited – it is preferable to take these paintings as complex projects, with specific requirements often unexpected".

In any case, the academic system had the classical reference as central in its ideological body and in its teaching methodology, and represented an attempt to formulate a theory in which art was an incarnation of the ideal principles of beauty, truth and good, destined to be a powerful instrument of public education and social reform. The academic program was systematically supported and decisively conducted by all the States in which it operated, as was the case in Brazil.

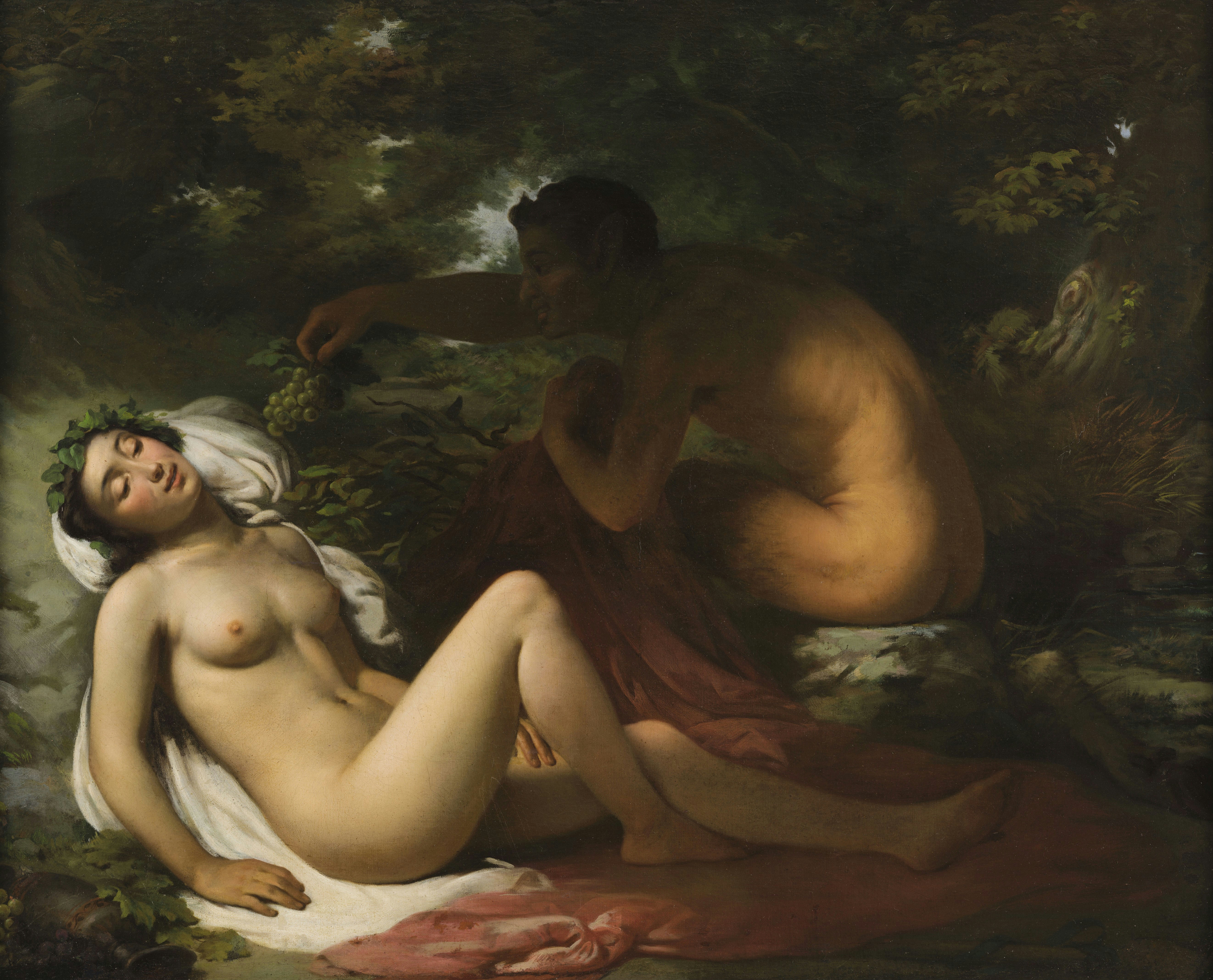
Bacante, 1857-58. National Museum of Fine Arts

Gonzaga Duque and other intellectuals of his time, who advocated an art more focused on realism and bourgeois themes disconnected from an association with the interests of the State, and who were harsh critics of various aspects of Meirelles's production and academic art in general, reflected the great changes that Brazil was going through. Society and culture were accelerating their updating in many other aspects, the entertainment industry was emerging, technology, science and freedom of thought were on the rise, the bourgeoisie became an increasingly important market and abandoned the role of passive recipient of lessons from aesthetic authorities, making their tastes prevail in an environment increasingly dominated by personal preferences. Social change would have repercussions on the arts such as the modernist movement, whose principles were very opposed to academics. The accusations of plagiarism raised against Batalha dos Guararapes and Primeira Missa are further evidence that the academic tradition in the country was already beginning to wear out as soon as it was consolidated. Among academics, the citation and paraphrase of other people's works and the use of traditional typological and compositional conventions were not only acceptable but even expected elements in the constitution of a work of art that deserved such a name, attesting to the artist's erudite training and his recognition. of the authority of the masters. Indeed, in the academic system, copying works by established masters of the past and present was an essential part of training, and Meirelles left many in this category. Overall he did not create a new language, and his success as a creator of valid symbols to this day is the mark of his originality using traditional resources.

Brazilian academicism did not shy away from absorbing elements of realism in its love of precise detail. Meirelles's works, especially in his final phase, reveal a strong influence of this current in this aspect. In this phase he composed his panoramas, the most important works of the period, and those that bring him closer to the modern universe, both in terms of genre and in the techniques of creation and exhibition, and in their commercial, advertising and educational purposes.

== Critical reception and legacy ==
Victor Meirelles was one of the most brilliant graduates of the Imperial Academy and one of the first Brazilian painters to receive recognition abroad. During his heyday he was one of the most respected artists of the Empire of Brazil and one of the most esteemed by the officialdom. For critics aligned with Pedro II’s civilizing program, Meirelles’s generation, with him and Pedro Américo as its leading figures, helped establish a national school of modern painting and was seen as an early avant-garde of its time. Meirelles was the teacher of many painters who would later make a name for themselves, among them Antônio Parreiras, Belmiro de Almeida, Décio Villares, Eliseu Visconti, Oscar Pereira da Silva, João Zeferino da Costa, Modesto Brocos y Gómez, Rafael Frederico, Rodolfo Amoedo, Pedro Peres and Almeida Júnior.

His most important production, recognized during his lifetime, is the one he left in historical painting, and although his portraits and landscapes were also praised in his time, today they are largely forgotten by critics. Among his historical paintings, the most important work is undoubtedly A Primeira Missa no Brasil, for which he became best known and celebrated to this day. In 1861, just completed, the painting was accepted with praise by the Paris Salon jury, an unprecedented achievement for a Brazilian artist. The richness of the painting's details, representing multiple expressions and situations, its evocative, technical and aesthetic qualities, immortalized the official narrative of the Discovery of Brazil as a heroic and peaceful act, celebrated in ecumenism by colonizers and indigenous people. Jorge Coli, reflecting on the critical consensus, wrote that: "Meirelles has reached the rare convergence of forms, intentions and meanings that make a painting powerfully enter a culture. This image of discovery can hardly be erased, or replaced. It is the first mass in Brazil. It is the powers of art making history." His panoramas, in turn, were received with great enthusiasm, but today, with only preparatory sketches remaining, one can only conjecture about their real appearance and quality.

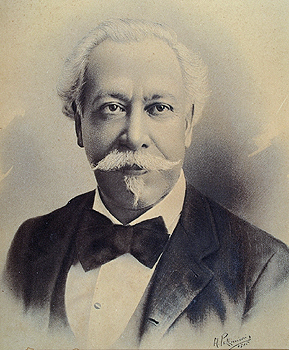
Posthumous portrait of Meirelles by A. Pelliciari, 1915

Meirelles also made many opponents, who considered him outdated and saw in academic conventions nothing but artificiality and empty rhetoric of meaning for the changing times. If, on the one hand, the Primeira Missa no Brasil got him homages and decorations such as the Order of the Rose, it also gave rise to the first criticisms, precisely because of what would be "excessive imagination" and infidelity to reality. The exhibition of another of his great compositions, Batalha dos Guararapes, alongside the Batalha do Avaí by Pedro Américo, at the Salon of 1879, gave rise to an unprecedented public debate in the Brazilian art scene. It is estimated that around 80 articles have been published on the event, inaugurating a fertile period for the formation of a body of criticism on aesthetics and ideology in Brazil, addressing controversial topics at the time such as nationalism, the role of criticism and the opposition between the avant-gardes and academic tradition. This exhibition also became memorable because it managed to mobilize virtually the entire population of Rio de Janeiro, with 292,286 visits being recorded over a period of 62 days, demonstrating the enormous interest of the general population in the artistic agitation of those days and in nationalist themes. At the time Meirelles heard it all, being called a genius and a master to a fake and incompetent, signaling the moment in which his career begins to decline. It was reflected in him, and with special poignancy due to his personal prominence and his position as a great symbol of academicism, the irresistible advance of the modernist aesthetic, which opposed everything he represented. The criticisms of Gonzaga Duque were mild compared to those of Angelo Agostini, who excelled in sarcasm. Speaking of Batalha dos Guararapes, and responding to the painter's declaration of intent, he said that everything was false, everything was montage, fantasy and convention, in no way corresponding to the events and feelings that should have taken place in the real conflagration:

"Mr. Meirelles 'who only wants to get it right', confesses that he changed the fact, went against history, did not paint the battle of Guararapes, but a happy and friendly meeting, in which Barreto de Meneses hugged Van Schoppe, Fernandes Vieira and Filipe Camarão, and Henrique Dias greeted Vidal de Negreiros in his own language: - Bença, meu sá moço! The Battle of Guararapes is therefore not a historical painting, as the title indicates and the catalog states, [...] but a caricature to laugh at, a playful combat, like those of the Moors and Christians, which the São Pedro de Alcântara theater gave us, old edition! [...] The Battle of Guararapes is not the Battle of Guararapes, it is a happy encounter in which the heroes of that time found themselves all gathered... and danced the minuet".

Meirelles also had a personal concern with the educational function of art, in addition to seeing it as a great means of disseminating Brazil abroad, which was in line with the government's official program. According to Sandra Makowiecky, Carlos Coelho and others, this was especially clear about his panoramas. With these works Meirelles took a big step towards modern sensibility. At the same time, Panorama do Rio must have been, from what can be seen in the studies that have survived, a testimony to the physiognomy of the city in a phase of great urban and architectural changes.

So identified with the Empire, the negative criticisms were accentuated with the advent of the Republic, and finally, Meirelles was ostracized. But he was never entirely forgotten. His students retained many of his teachings and relayed them, and when his panoramas were rediscovered in 1910 his memory was remembered as that of a distinguished artist — which makes the fate that the panels received all the more paradoxical — and in 1924 the modernist Ronald de Carvalho described him as one of the leading artists of the 19th century, praising his sensitivity to nature, light and "atmosphere", his correct design, his technique and his skills as a landscaper and panoramicist.

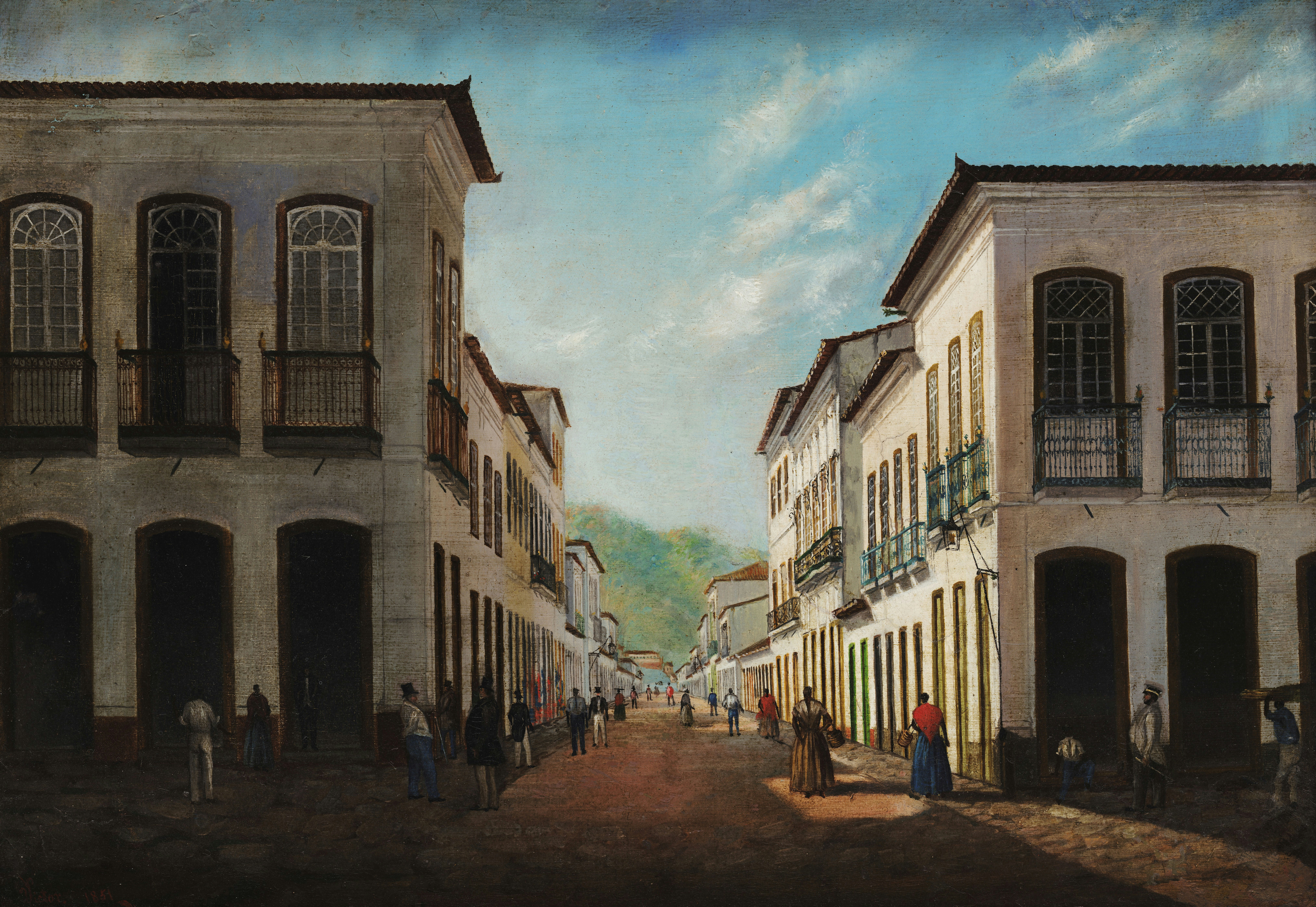
Victor Meirelles: Uma rua da cidade do Desterro, 1851. National Museum of Fine Arts

Meirelles figure was revived with more force after the centenary celebrations of his birth, in 1932, when he was hailed as a humanist, a martyr and a painter of the Brazilian soul. Today, his works are displayed in the largest Brazilian museums, art critics and academics are incessantly interested, and he lends his name to several streets and schools. He was biographed by Carlos Rubens, Argeu Guimarães, Angelo de Proença Rosa and others, and the Victor Meirelles Museum, located in his hometown, is dedicated to preserving his memory, in addition to the Santa Catarina Art Museum maintaining a National Salon that bears his name. In 2006 the Victor Meirelles Museum began a project that aims to systematically survey and catalog his complete work. His very significant production places him in a very prominent position in the history of Brazilian art. According to Sandra Makowiecky, for many he is the greatest Brazilian painter of the 19th century. Meirelles, together with his biggest rival, Pedro Américo, managed to produce images of great evocative power, which to this day remain alive in Brazil's collective memory as the canonical visualization of some of its main founding myths. Mário Coelho stated that:

"Meirelles knew the glory of the decorated, the criticism of the feuilletons, he was traditional, produced solid works, images that were 'eternal', and [was] innovative, adhering to the ephemeral and the fashion of panoramas. He participated in this concept of modernity situated between the eternal and the fleeting, in the conviviality of Paris, 'capital of the 19th century'. He left a small village - Nossa Senhora do Desterro, where with basic notions of geometric design he managed to register his city. He was a student and teacher at the Imperial Academy of Fine Arts, participated in the formation of a generation of painters, wrote about his own work, justifying it, explaining it, argued critically several times, placed advertisements in newspapers, but above all, he painted his entire life, in Europe and Brazil. He traveled a lot, [he] knew a lot about the art of his time. He wasn't afraid to innovate and use technologies that were despised by many, including photography. He knew how to take advantage of the construction of the landscape, in the detailing of the portraits. He glimpsed in the panoramas the possibility of showing his great art, scandalously monumental even in today's eyes. [...] Perhaps going against the grain, he ventured into a history of painting as few would have the courage to do".

== Selected paintings ==
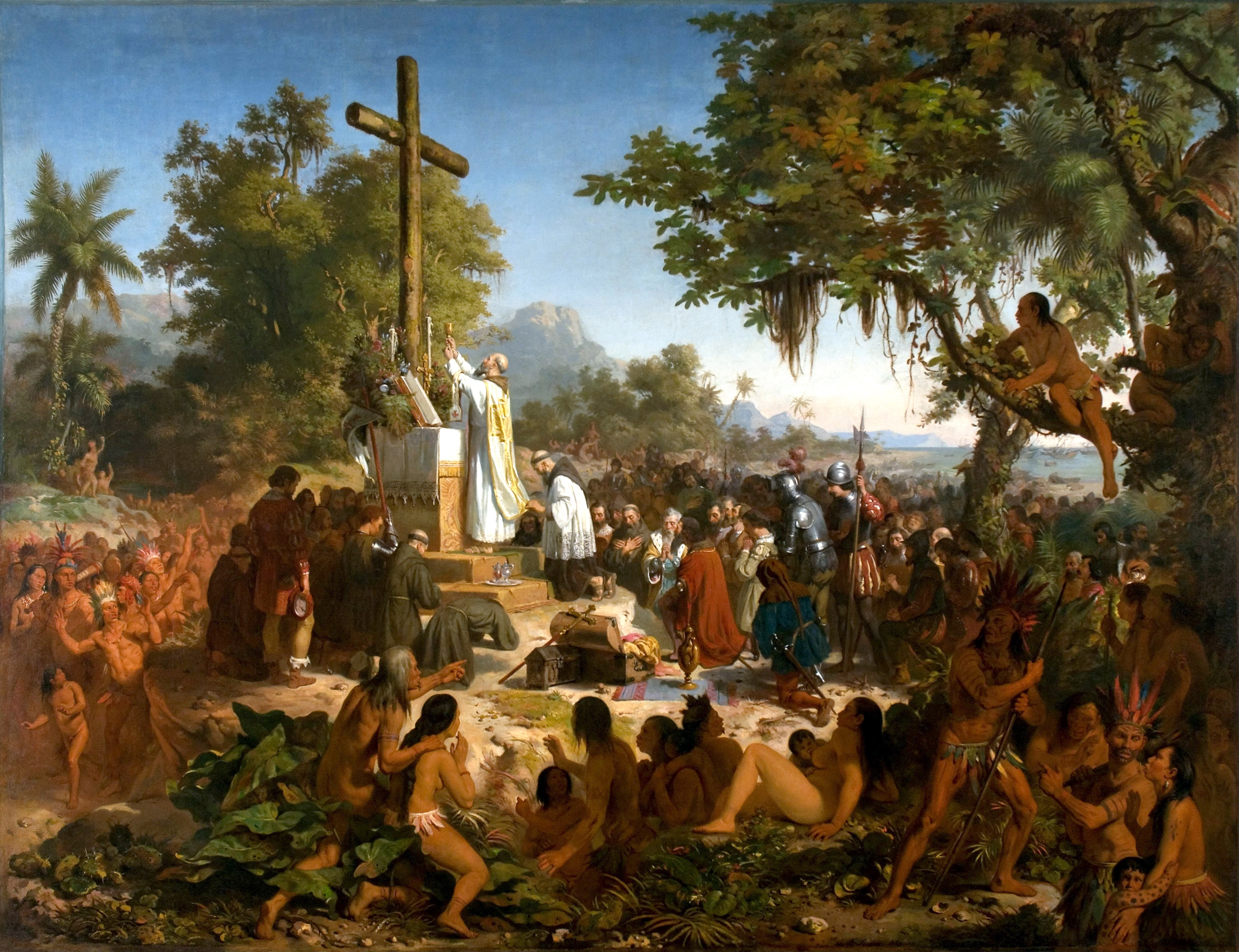
Primeira Missa no Brasil, 1861

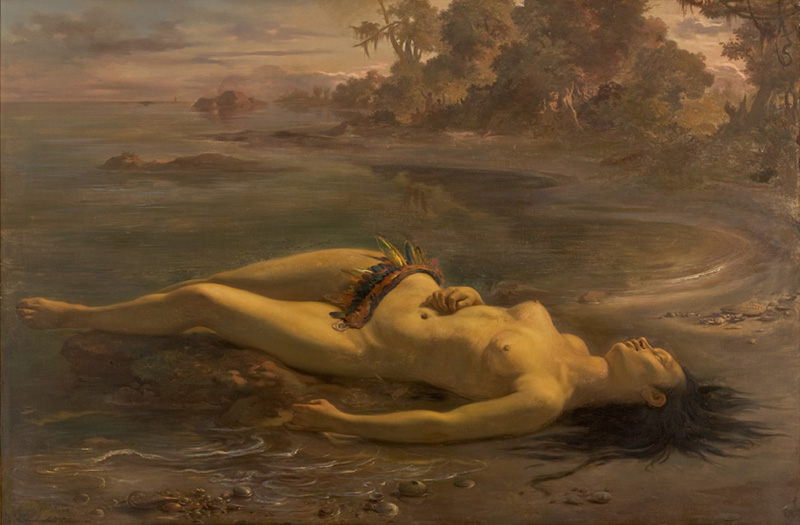
Moema, 1866. An example of indianism

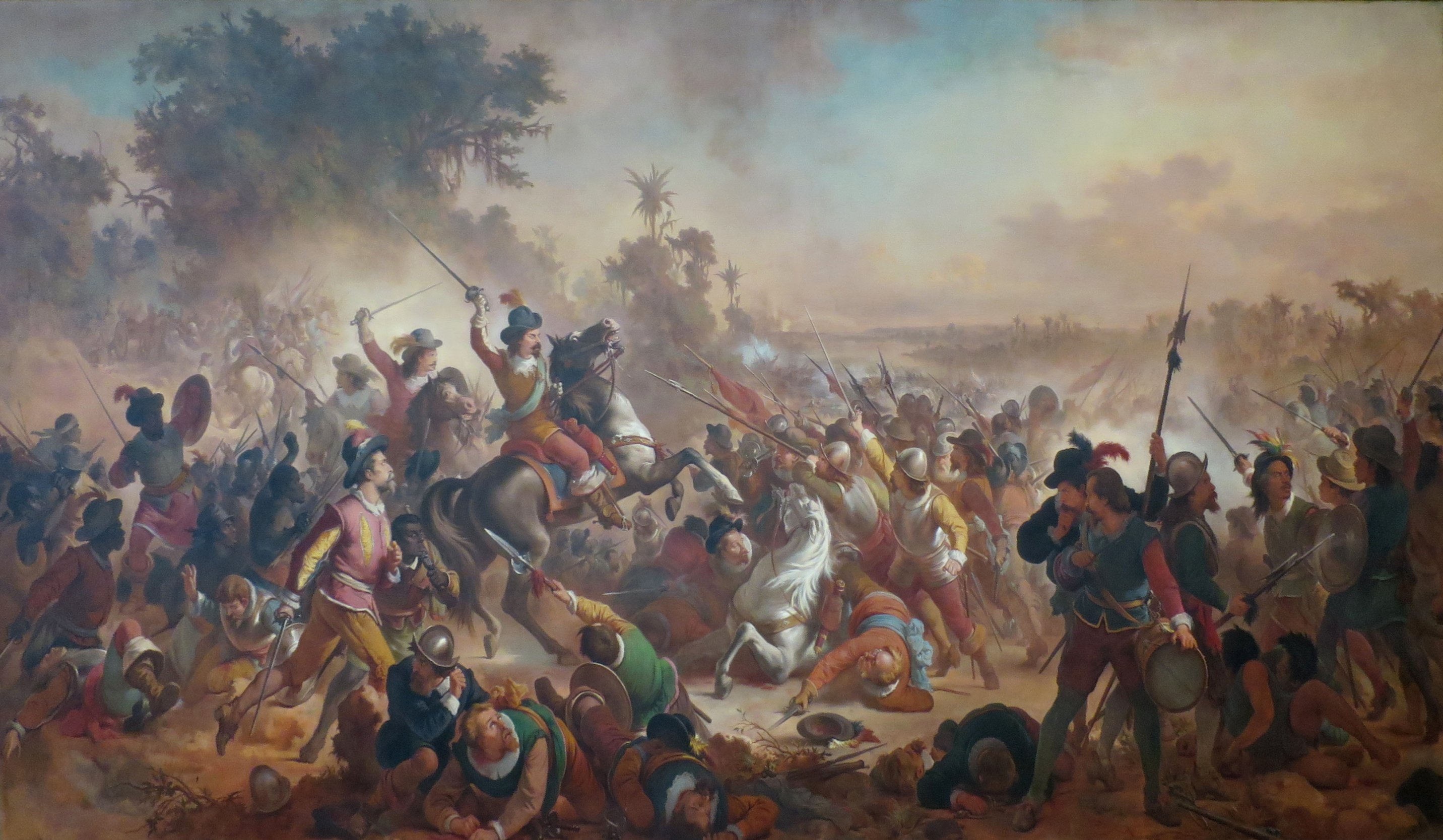
Batalha dos Guararapes, 1879, depicting the battle that took place in 1649 against the Dutch in Brazil

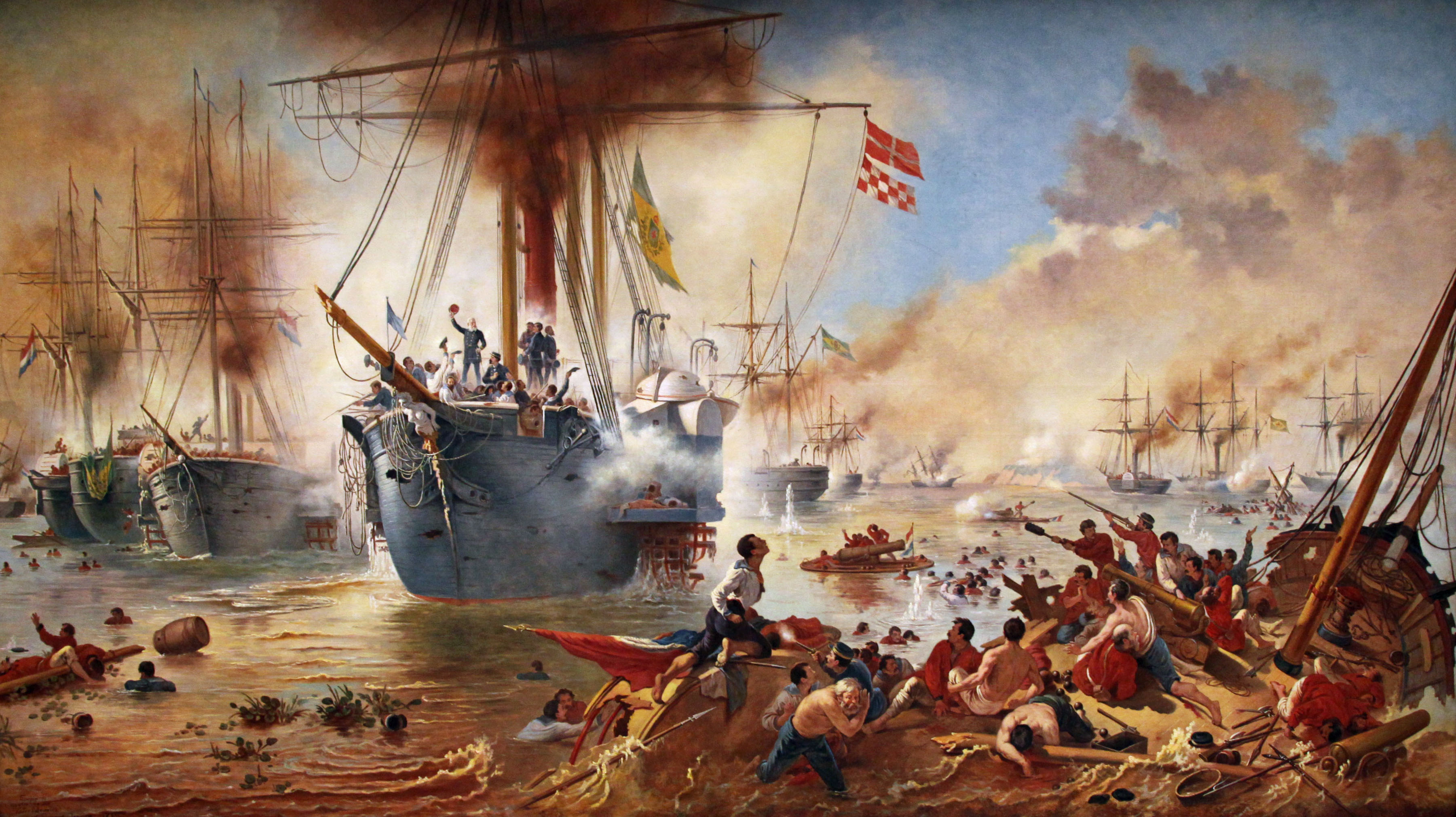
Batalha do Riachuelo, depicting the Battle of Riachuelo during the Paraguayan War (copy by Oscar Pereira da Silva)
