= Apogee of Pedro II of Brazil =

The apogee of Pedro II of Brazil refers to the decade from 1870 to 1881 during which he, and Brazil itself, reached the height of their prestige and activity. The nation experienced rapid development and the emperor was intimately involved in pushing for further progress on a variety of economic and cultural fronts. It was during this period that serious efforts toward the end of slavery began to be implemented.

== Apogee ==
The end of the Paraguayan War ushered in what is considered the "golden age" and apogee of the Brazilian Empire. In a "general way, the 1870s were prosperous for the nation and its monarch. It was a period of social and political progress where the distribution of national wealth began to benefit a greater part of the population." Brazil's international reputation skyrocketed and, with the exception of the United States, was unequalled by any other American nation. Indeed, the "start of the 1870s brought prosperous times for Brazil. Its economy was booming, and schemes for internal development—railroads, shipping lines, and immigrant colonies—proliferated. With slavery destined for extinction and other reforms projected, the prospects for 'moral and material advances' seemed vast."

== Racial thoughts and abolitionism ==
Few Brazilians opposed slavery around 1870, and even fewer were openly against it. But among its opponents was Pedro. He "repudiated the enslaved manpower and he considered it a national shame." The emperor never bought slaves. The only ones he owned (around forty) came from an inheritance he received when declared of age in 1840—at which point he immediately set them all free. Around this time he began looking for ways to abolish slavery, even if gradually. He affirmed in a letter: "Nobody desires the abolition more strongly than I do." In a private conversation with Louis Agassiz he said: "Slavery is a terrible curse on any nation, and it must, and will, disappear among us [Brazilians]." He was supported by few, among them his sister Dona Francisca and his wife, Teresa Cristina. But "the emperor, who declared several times his intention to assume direction of the abolitionist movement, as expected, took too long to overcome the political obstacles."

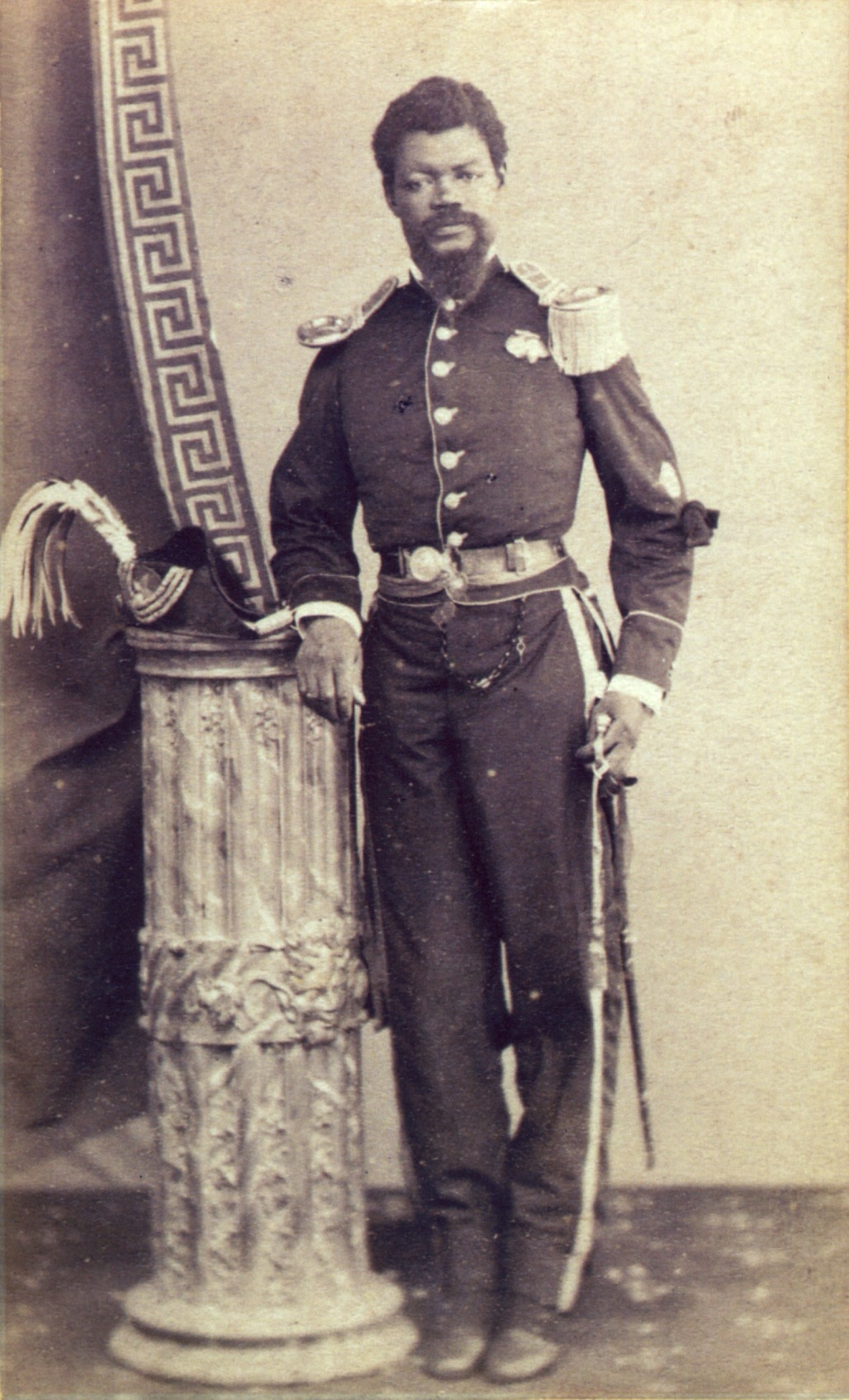
The Afro-Brazilian Cândido da Fonseca Galvão, friend of Emperor Pedro II.

Pedro was not a racist and manifested "great tolerance towards all his subjects, without exception, no matter their color or faith." He also exhibited tolerance towards both Jews (when asked why there were no laws against them in the country, he answered: "I will not attack the Jews, as the God of my religion came from their people") and Muslims (affirming that a sincere reconciliation between the West and the East was necessary). The emperor never adopted ideas, common during the era, espousing racial inequality. According to historian Roderick J. Barman:

"During one of his visits to a night school in Rio, the Liceu de Artes e Ofícios, the emperor learned that a freed slave was enrolled, learning how to read, write and do arithmetic. 'When he entered the classroom, he went up to him, clapping him on the shoulder, as a demonstration of his immense satisfaction in seeing the way in which a man of the people was striving to learn how to be useful to the country and his family.' Pedro’s commendable freedom from racial prejudice meant that he did not perceive skin color as a bar to civilization or citizenship."

The abolition of slavery was a delicate subject in Brazil. Slaves were used by everyone, from the richest to the poorest. They worked as house servants, farmers, miners, prostitutes, and gardeners. Slavery was so widespread in the country that many former slaves owned slaves, and cases of slaves who had their own slaves were common. So strongly entrenched was this institution, that none of the rebellions which occurred during the regency in the 1830s advocated ending it. Even the Malê Revolt had as a goal only the release of enslaved Muslims. To oppose slavery was seen as being counter to the national interest. Even so, the emperor did not give up. Pedro despised slave dealers and refused to grant titles of nobility to any of them, including powerful and influential figures at court. He threatened to abdicate if the General Assembly (parliament) did not declare the traffic illegal, which was done in 1850. This was his first open move against slavery.

As one source supplying new slaves had been eliminated, at the beginning of 1860s Pedro turned his attention to eliminating the remaining source: the enslavement of children born to slaves. On his initiative, legislation was drafted by the Marquis of São Vicente. The Paraguayan War, however, delayed discussion of the proposal by the General Assembly. Pedro openly asked for the gradual eradication of slavery in the Speech from the Throne of 1867. He was heavily criticized (including by the republicans), and his move condemned as "national suicide." The accusation was aired "that abolition was his personal desire and not that of the nation." Eventually, the nomination of the abolitionist and conservative Viscount of Rio Branco as President of the Council of Ministers made possible the passage of the bill, which was enacted as the Law of Free Birth on 28 September 1871, under which all children born of slave women after that date would be considered free.
