= Moema (Victor Meirelles) =

Painting by Victor Meirelles

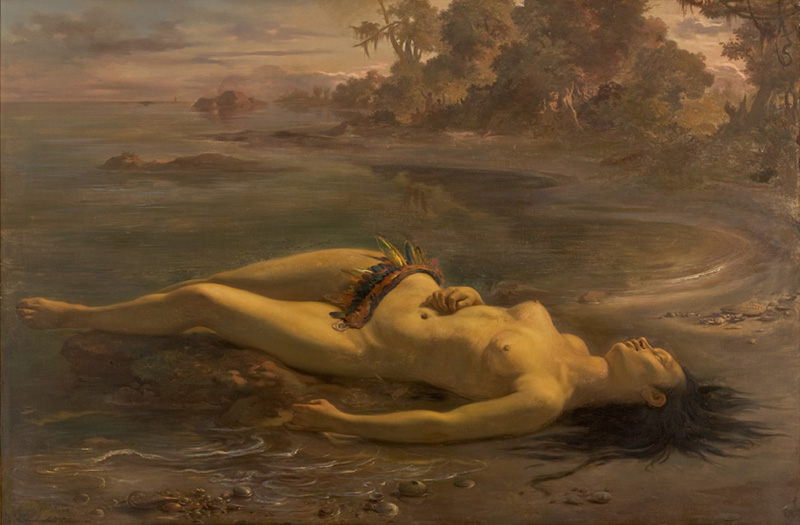
- Artist: Victor Meirelles
- Year: 1866
- Medium: oil paint, canvas
- Dimensions: 129 cm (51 in) × 190 cm (75 in) × 3 cm (1.2 in)
- Location: São Paulo Museum of Art

Moema is an oil painting on canvas created in 1866 by Brazilian artist Victor Meirelles. It depicts the homonym character from the epic poem Caramuru (1781), by Santa Rita Durão. The work does not depict a scene from the poem, but instead Meirelles's personal interpretation of the character's fate, submerging into the water after being rejected by Caramuru.

The painting was shown for the first time in 1866, in the Imperial Academy of Fine Arts. It is a part of the collection of the São Paulo Museum of Art since 1947. Under Beatriz Pimenta Camargo's presidency, the museum obtained funds for the restoration of the painting, considered to be one of the most important ones in its collection.

A preparatory sketch created before the actual painting shows Moema in a different position, as well as a group of natives in the background which are more prominent than the group in the finished painting's background.

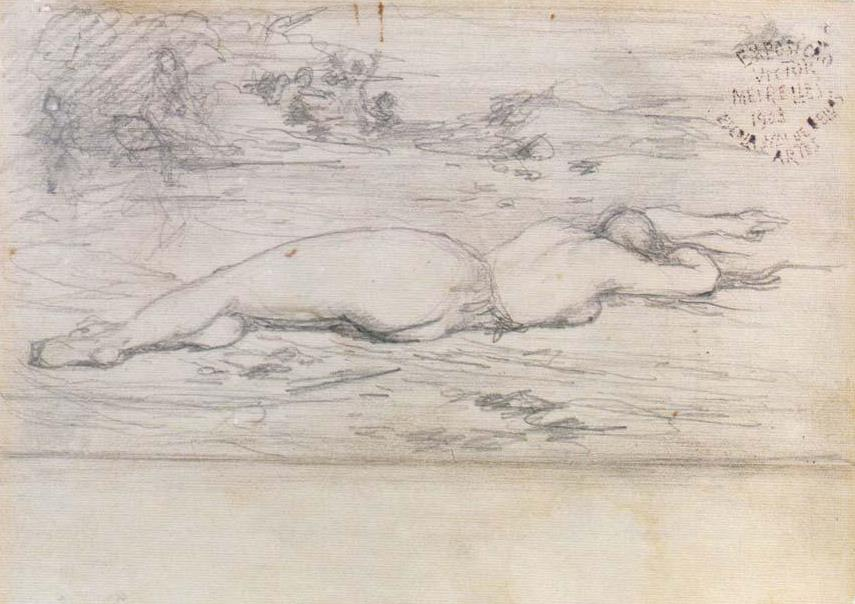
Preparatory sketch

== Reception ==
Counselor Tomaz Gomes dos Santos, director of the Imperial Academy of Fine Arts, stated:

A work of elevated value, for it gathers in large quantity all of the qualities of grand painting, is Moema by Mr. Vitor Meireles de Lima. The drawing, the colours, the aerial transparency, the lighting effects, the perspective, the exact depiction of nature in its most beautiful aspects, these elevate this masterful composition to the category of an original work of great value. The subject, entirely national, is one of our most touching legends [...]. Moema seals the master's reputation, which emerged brilliantly upon his debut [...].

The painting and Meirelles himself also received praise from the Baron Homem de Melo:

Mr. Vitor Meireles is a realized artist, who settled his style definitely, in its ultimate manner. His drawing is of an irreproachable purity, without the sculptural hardness which removes all action and mobility from the figures of a history painting. Its colours are brilliant, but accentuated with perfect tonal gradation and with this fortunate sobriety which is the secret of true artistic superiority.
