= Museu Nacional de Belas Artes =

Fine art museum in Rio de Janeiro, Brazil

National Museum of Fine Arts
- Museu Nacional de Belas Artes
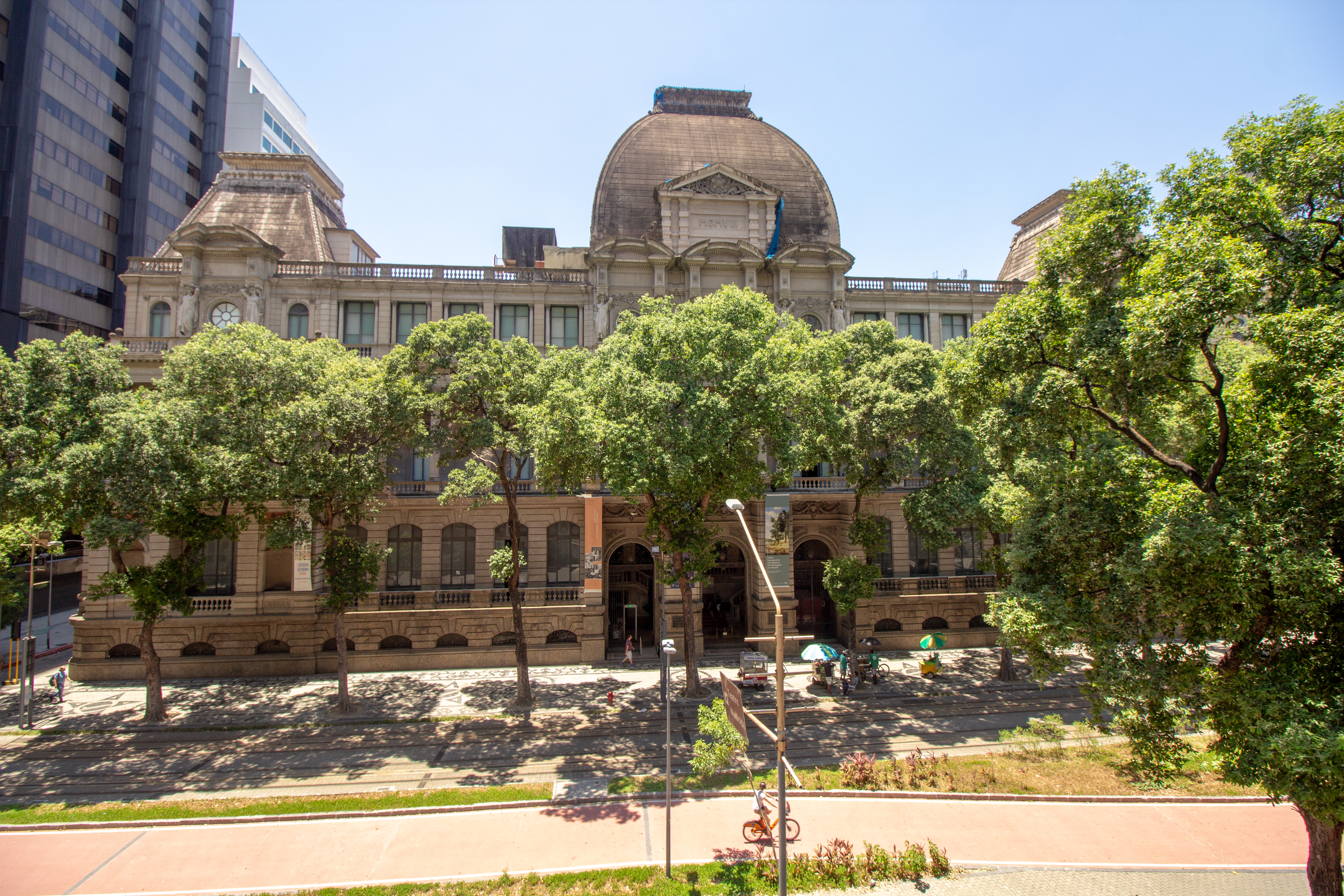
- Interactive fullscreen map
- Established: 1937
- Location: Rio de Janeiro, Brazil
- Coordinates: 22°54′32″S 43°10′33″W
- Visitors: 135.726 (2012)
- Director: Mônica Xexéo
- Website: gov.br/museus/pt-br/museus-ibram/mnba

The Museu Nacional de Belas Artes (MNBA; Portuguese for National Museum of Fine Arts) is a national art museum located in the city of Rio de Janeiro, Brazil. The museum, officially established in 1937 by the initiative of education minister Gustavo Capanema, was inaugurated in 1938 by President Getúlio Vargas. The museum collection, on the other hand, takes its rise in the transfer of the Portuguese Court to Brazil in the early 19th century, when King John VI brought along with him part of the Portuguese Royal Collection. This art collection stayed in Brazil after the King's return to Europe and became the core collection of the National School of Fine Arts. When the museum was created in 1937, it became the heir not only the National School collection, but also of its headquarters, a 1908 eclectic style building projected by Spanish architect Adolfo Morales de los Ríos.

The Museu Nacional de Belas Artes is one of the most important cultural institutions of the country, as well as the most important museum of Brazilian art, particularly rich in 19th-century paintings and sculptures. The collection includes more than 20,000 pieces, among paintings, sculptures, drawings and prints, of Brazilian and international artists, ranging from High Middle Ages to contemporary art. It also includes smaller assemblages of decorative arts, folk and African art. The museum library has a collection of about 19,000 titles. The building was listed as Brazilian national heritage in 1973.

== History ==
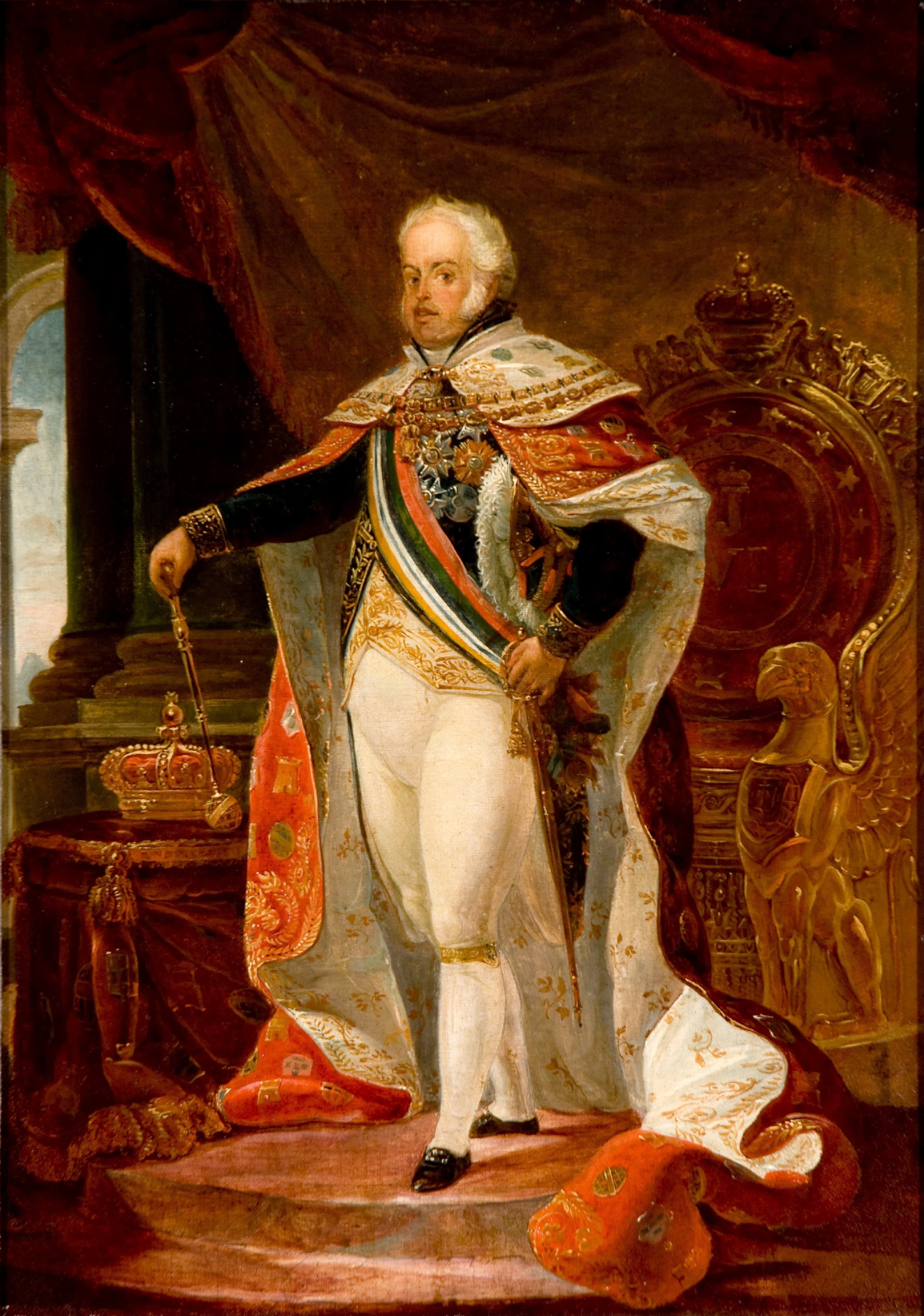
Jean-Baptiste Debret, John VI of Portugal (w/d). Museu Nacional de Belas Artes collection.

Although the museum was officially established on 13 January 1937 and inaugurated on 19 August 1938, its history is much older, ranging back to the transfer of the Portuguese Court to Brazil in 1808. Fleeing the invasion of Portugal by French troops, King John VI established himself in Rio de Janeiro, bringing with him an assemblage of works of art which originally belonged to the Portuguese Royal Collection. After the king's return to Europe, a major part of this collection stayed in Brazil and is identified as the main core of European art in the museum. The collection was later enlarged by Joachim Lebreton, a French artist who led the French Artistic Mission that came to Brazil in 1816 to help organise the arts in the country.

The French Artistic Mission was charged by John VI to organise the Royal School of Sciences, Arts and Crafts in Rio de Janeiro. Its first building – designed by French Neoclassical architect Grandjean de Montigny — was inaugurated in 1826, by Brazilian Emperor Peter I. On the occasion of the building's inauguration, the Royal School was renamed Imperial Academy of Fine Arts. In the following decades, the Imperial Academy, heir of John VI's holdings, was able to expand this collection, gathering an important assemblage of paintings and forming a glyptotheque.

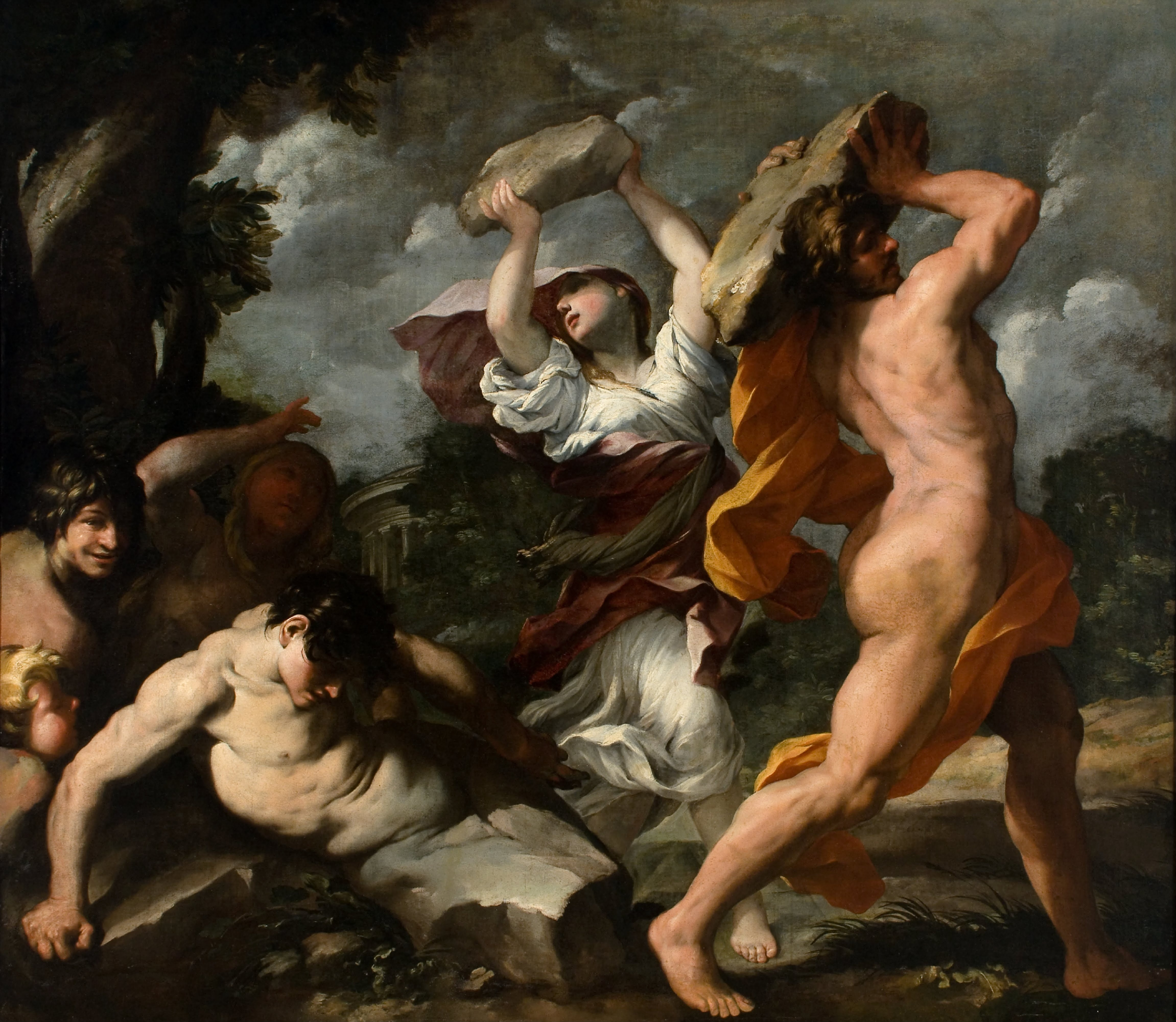
Giovanni Maria Bottalla, Deucalion and Pyrrha (c. 1635). One of the paintings brought from Portugal by John VI.

After the proclamation of the Republic in 1889, the Imperial Academy was renamed Escola Nacional de Belas Artes (National School of Fine Arts). The school remained in its original building in the following years. But in the 1900s (decade), the center of Rio de Janeiro was extensively remodeled following the models of Parisian urbanisation. Between 1906 and 1908, a new building was constructed for the National School of Fine Arts in the Central Avenue (now Avenida Rio Branco), very close to the new main square of the city (the Cinelândia).

The style of the new building, designed by Spanish architect Adolfo Morales de los Ríos, is clearly inspired by the Louvre Museum in Paris. But during the construction the project was modified, possibly by Rodolfo Bernardelli and, later, by Archimedes Memoria. As a result, the building presents an eclectic design, with facades modeled after different styles. The main façade toward Avenida Rio Branco is inspired by French Renaissance, with pediment, colonnade and terracotta reliefs representing Ancient civilizations, as well as medallions painted by Henrique Bernardelli, portraying members of the French Artistic Mission and renowned Brazilian artists. The side façades are plainer and make reference to Italian Renaissance. They are adorned with Parisian mosaics with figures of architects, painters and art theorists, such as Vasari, Vitruvius and da Vinci. The back façade is strictly Neoclassical, decorated with reliefs executed by Edward Cadwell Spruce. The interior decoration is based in the use of noble materials, such as marble, mosaics, stucco, crystal, French ceramic and statuary. The building was listed as a national heritage work on 24 May 1973.

The construction was finished in 1908. This same year, the school and its art collection started being transferred to the new headquarters. The painting collection was installed on the third floor. The collection of plaster copies of ancient statues, used in art classes, was installed on the second floor, with a museographic project specially developed for them. The fourth floor was conceived to house the administrative offices and studios for practical classes. In 1931, the school was incorporated by the University of Rio de Janeiro.

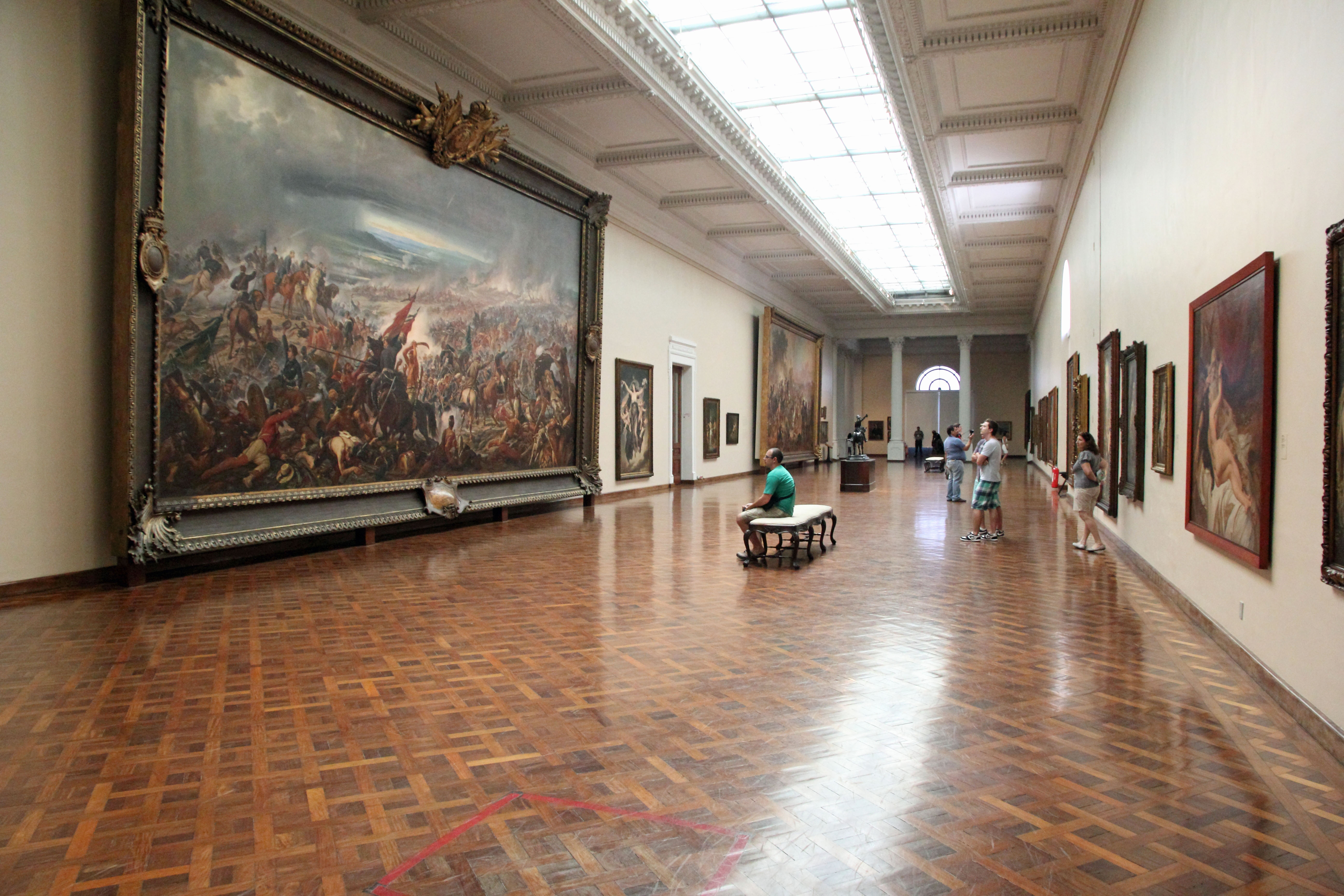
Exhibition room with Brazilian paintings of the permanent collection.

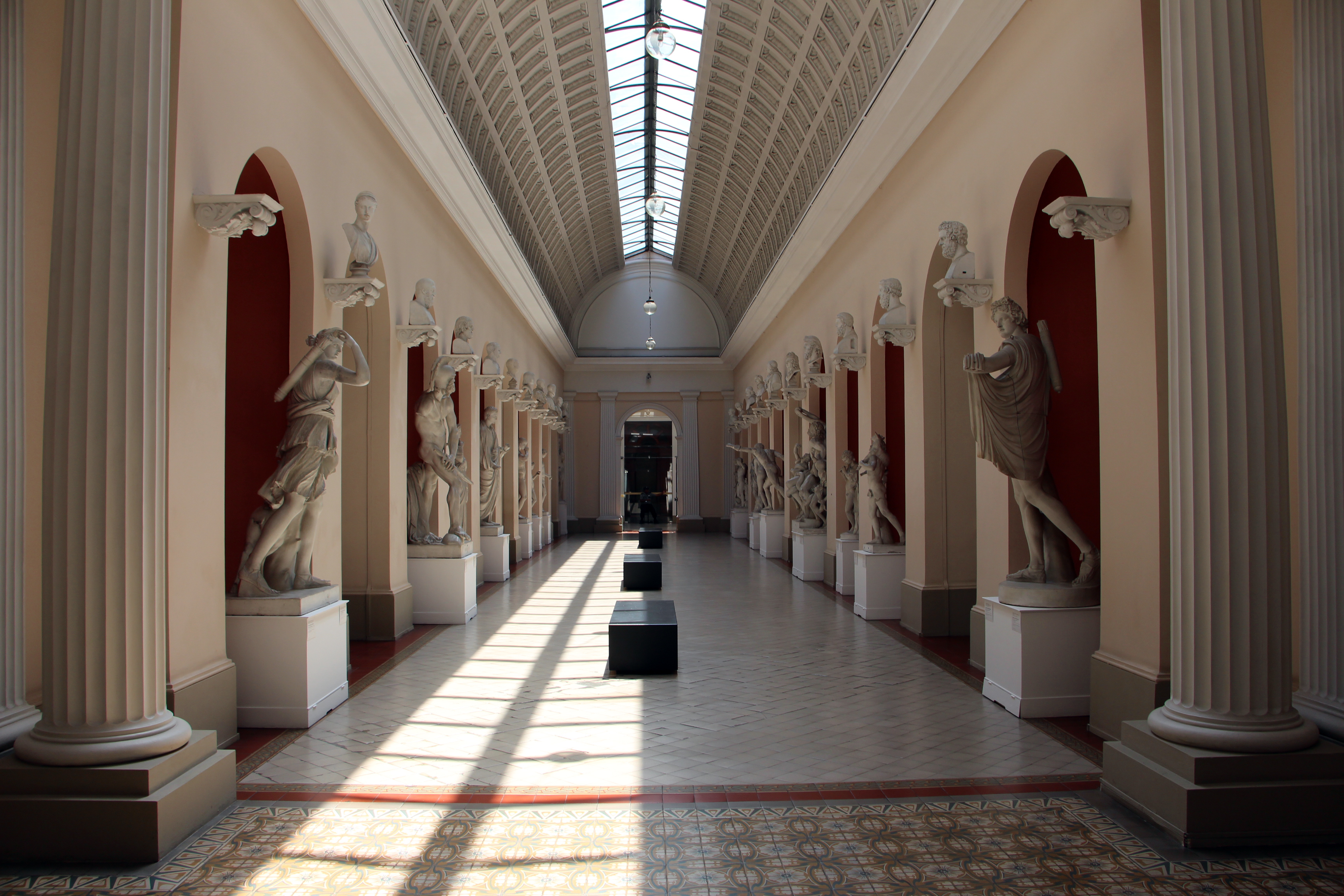
The collection of plaster copies of ancient statues of the Museu Nacional de Belas Artes (National Museum of Fine Arts).

When the museum was created in 1937 by the education minister Gustavo Capanema, it inherited the Escola Nacional de Belas Artes' holdings and was installed in its headquarters; the school's administrative offices, studios and most of the courses stayed in the building. During the 1940s and 1950s, some courses were transferred to other locations. In 1975, the remaining courses were transferred to a modern building on the university main campus (Ilha do Fundão), projected by Jorge Moreira. On the occasion of this transfer, the collection, until then shared by both the museum and the school, was dismembered. Most of the art collection stayed with the museum, and an assemblage of documents, "didactic" works of art or artworks produced in pedagogic activities, as well as the Jeronymo Ferreira das Neves collection (donated to the art school in 1947) was transferred to the Ilha do Fundão campus, serving as core collection of the university's Museu Dom João VI. After the transfer, the Fundação Nacional de Artes (National Arts Foundation) was installed in the school's former rooms.

In the 1980s some serious structural problems were detected in the building. Since they represented a major threat to the preservation of the collection, the museum passed through a series of reforms, with the aim of modernizing the exhibition areas and reformulating the museographic project and, at the same time, preserving the building original style and decoration. In the mid-1990s, the Fundação Nacional de Artes was transferred to another location and the museum was finally able to occupy the whole building. Currently, the museum counts with 6,733.84 square meters of exhibition area and a deposit of 1,797.32 square meters. In addition to the exhibition areas and technical/administrative rooms, the museum possesses laboratories of conservation and restoration and studios for plaster molding.

The museum library specializes in 19th- and 20th-century art. Besides the collection of about 19,000 titles, it comprises more than 12,000 audiovisual items, iconographic and textual documents, rare books, newspapers, magazines, catalogues, and other materials related to the institution's history, from the Imperial Academy to nowadays. In addition to permanent and temporary exhibitions, the museum organises educational activities for the general public and art education programs for teachers, with the aim of diffusing and granting a better understanding of the Brazilian cultural heritage.

== Collections ==
Since its beginning in 1808, the collection of works of art has been enormously expanded and now has around 20,000 items. The collections include painting, sculpture, drawing as well as decorative arts, furniture, folk art and African art.

=== Brazilian art ===
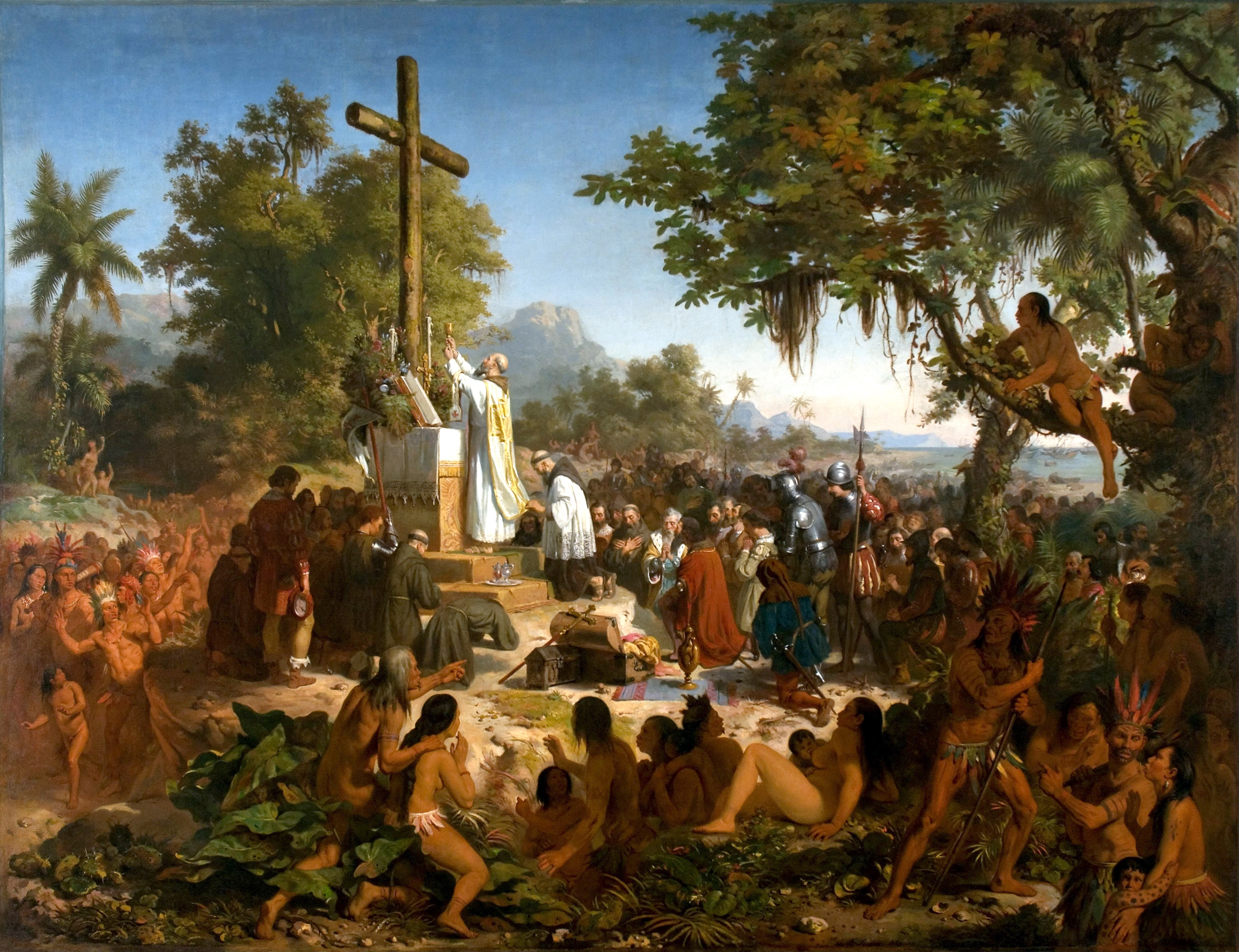
Victor Meirelles – The First Mass in Brazil (1861)

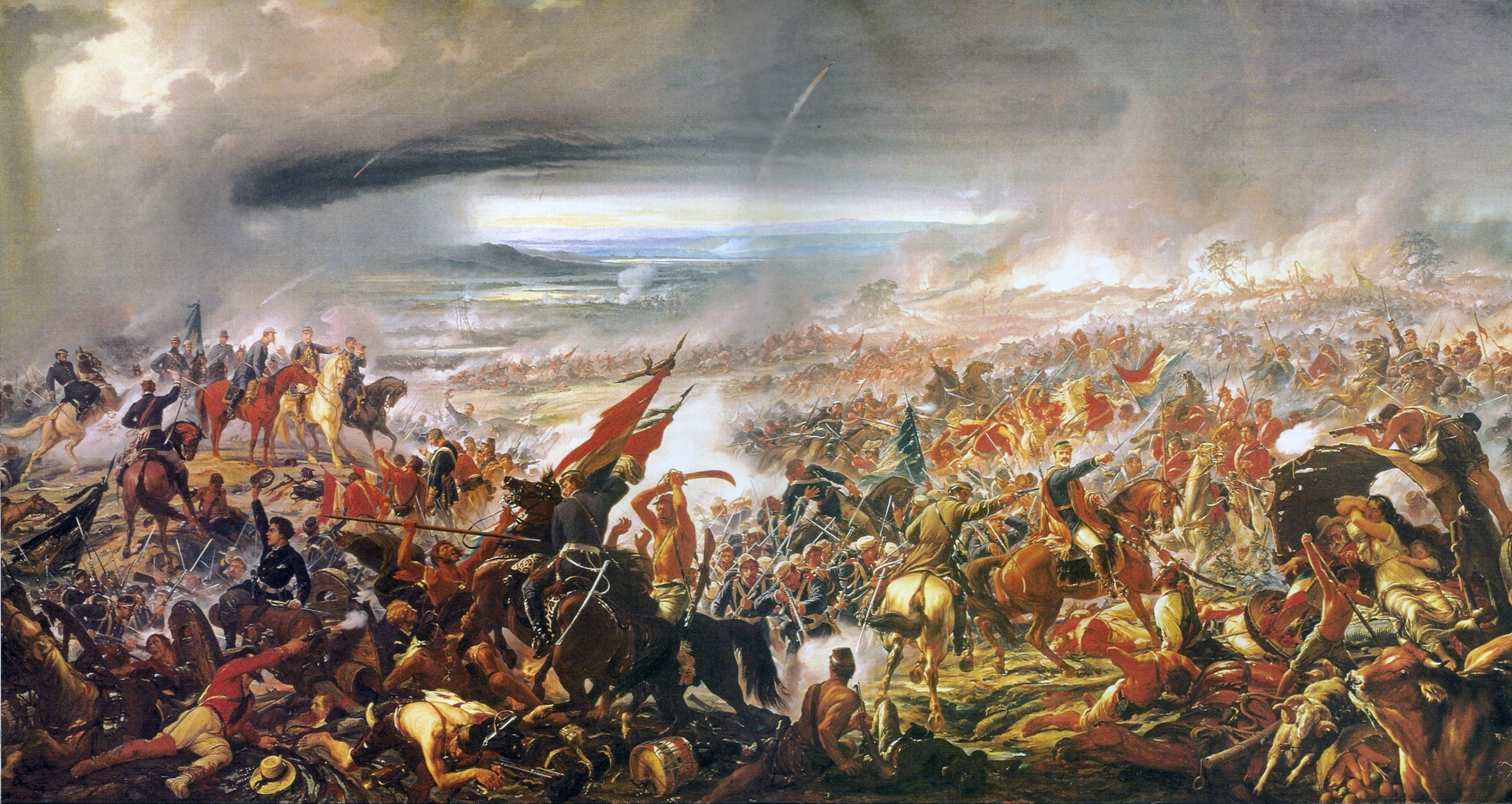
Pedro Américo – Battle of Avaí (1872–1877).

==== Paintings ====
The Museu Nacional de Belas Artes is the heir of the collections gathered since the early 19th century by the Royal School of Sciences, Arts and Crafts and its successors (the Imperial Academy of Fine Arts and the National School of Fine Arts), i.e., the national institution responsible for the register of Brazilian pictorial output. Therefore, it is widely accepted that no other collection, public or private, is able to present such a wide and comprehensive panorama of Brazilian painting concerning to the French Artistic Mission, 19th and early 20th centuries painting, even in analogous conditions. The collection includes several works by Nicolas-Antoine Taunay, Jean-Baptiste Debret, Félix Taunay, Victor Meirelles (more than 150 works, including The First Mass in Brazil and Battle of Guararapes), Pedro Américo (Battle of Avaí, Moses and Jochebed, etc.), Almeida Júnior (Countrymen stalking, The Brazilian lumberjack, etc.), Manuel de Araújo Porto-alegre, Pedro Weingärtner, Rodolfo Amoedo, João Zeferino da Costa, Henrique Bernardelli, Eliseu Visconti, Castagneto, Hipólito Caron, Antônio Parreiras, and many others.

Although the painting collection is particularly strong concerning the 19th century, it also includes representative paintings of the Colonial period, such as works by Manuel da Cunha, Leandro Joaquim and Manuel Dias de Oliveira. The modern section includes a modest assemblage of paintings by artists closely related to the Modern Art Week (Anita Malfatti, Tarsila do Amaral, Di Cavalcanti, Lasar Segall, Vicente do Rego Monteiro, etc.) and a more representative collection of modernist painters active in the 1930s and on (Cândido Portinari, Djanira, Guignard, Cícero Dias, Alfredo Volpi, Maria Leontina, Ivan Serpa, Iberê Camargo, etc.). Among the contemporary names, the collection includes Hélio Oiticica, Paulo Pasta and Eduardo Sued.

==== Sculptures ====
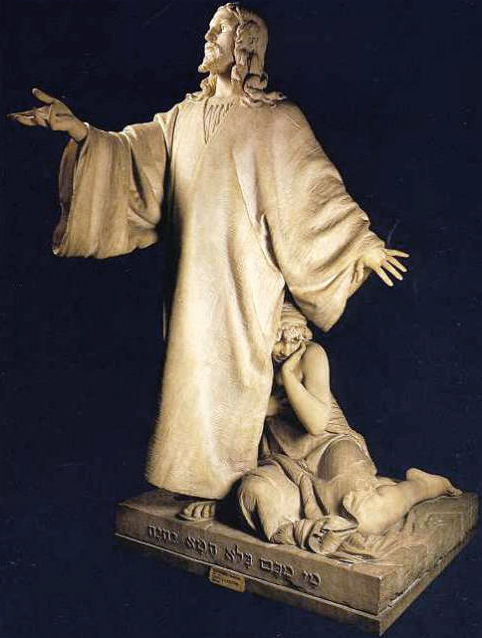
Rodolfo Bernardelli – Jesus and the woman taken in adultery (1881)

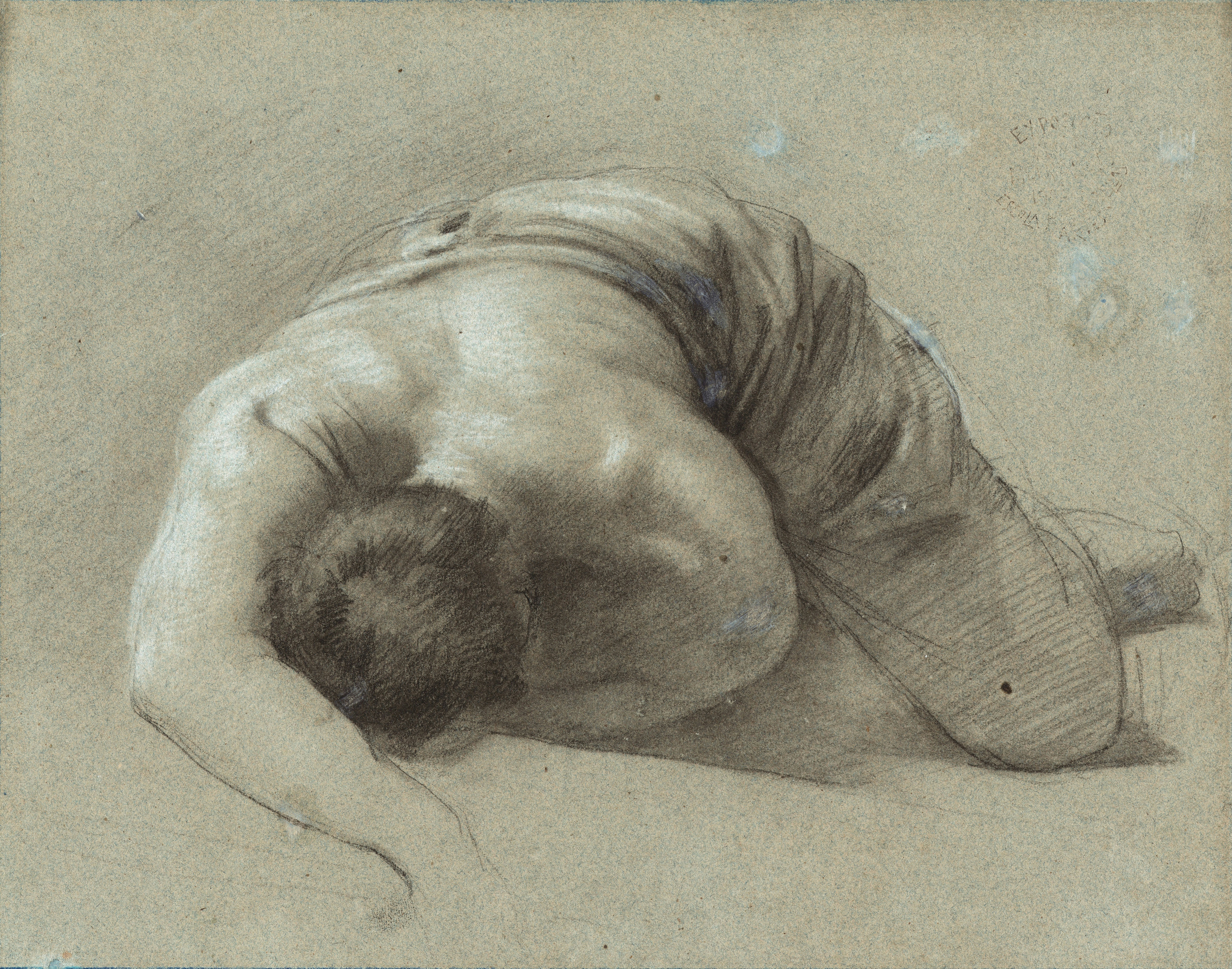
Victor Meirelles – Paraguayan soldier (study for the Naval Combat of Riachuelo). Crayon and pencil on paper.

The Brazilian sculpture section is the smallest among the museum's departments of Brazilian art and also has its origins in the holdings of the former National Academy. Several artworks in the collection were acquired through the transfer of works produced by artists who were granted a subvention by the government to study in Europe. The sculptor Rodolfo Bernardelli, who was appointed as director of the academy in the late 19th century, was the responsible for starting the systematic gathering of sculptures. He is also the best represented sculptor in the collection, with more than 250 works donated by his brother after his death. The Brazilian academic sculpture is also represented by Marc Ferrez, Chaves Pinheiro, Almeida Reis, and Correia Lima, among others.

The collection of modern and contemporary sculpture include names such as Celso Antônio de Menezes, Franz Weissmann, Amílcar de Castro, Rubem Valentim, Sergio de Camargo, Farnese de Andrade, etc. In recent years, the museum has expanded its collection of colonial sculpture of the 17th and 18th centuries, most of which are of unrecorded authorship.

==== Prints ====
The Museu Nacional de Belas Artes has one of the most important collections of engravings in the country, an assemblage of works which is able to provide a remarkable panorama of the historical development of print technique in Brazil. The collection comprises works by August Off, Emil Bauch, Carlos Oswald, Oswaldo Goeldi, Lívio Abramo, Lasar Segall, Maria Bonomi, Fayga Ostrower, Carlos Scliar, Poty Lazzarotto, Edith Behring, Anna Letycia Quadros, Dionísio del Santo, Anna Bella Geiger, Rubens Gerchman. In addition to the prints, the collection includes a group of 126 woodblocks by Goeldi, 62 copper plates by Carlos Oswald, and 27 plates by Djanira, etc. The collection of prints is permanently available to consult by researchers, artists and general public in the "Gabinete de Gravuras" (prints cabinet) and is presented in temporary exhibitions at the Carlos Oswald Room.

==== Drawings ====
The section of Brazilian drawings of the Museu Nacional de Belas Artes contains about 4,000 works, being one of the largest collections of the institution. It includes works on pencil, pen, ink, crayon, watercolor, chalk, and other techniques, either produced as sketches or as independent artworks. The main core is composed by the large assemblages of works by Victor Meirelles and the brothers Rodolfo and Henrique Bernardelli, as well as other 19th century masters, such as Rodolfo Amoedo, Grandjean de Montigny, Zeferino da Costa, Eliseu Visconti, Manuel de Araújo Porto-alegre, Lucílio de Albuquerque and Henrique Alvim Corrêa, but the collection also includes a number of modern and contemporary artists such as Anita Malfatti, Di Cavalcanti, Tarsila do Amaral, Flávio de Carvalho, Oswaldo Goeldi, Cândido Portinari, Anna Maria Maiolino, Gregório Gruber and Aldemir Martins. One of the highlights in the modern section is the assemblage of more than 600 drawings by Djanira.

=== International art ===
==== Paintings ====
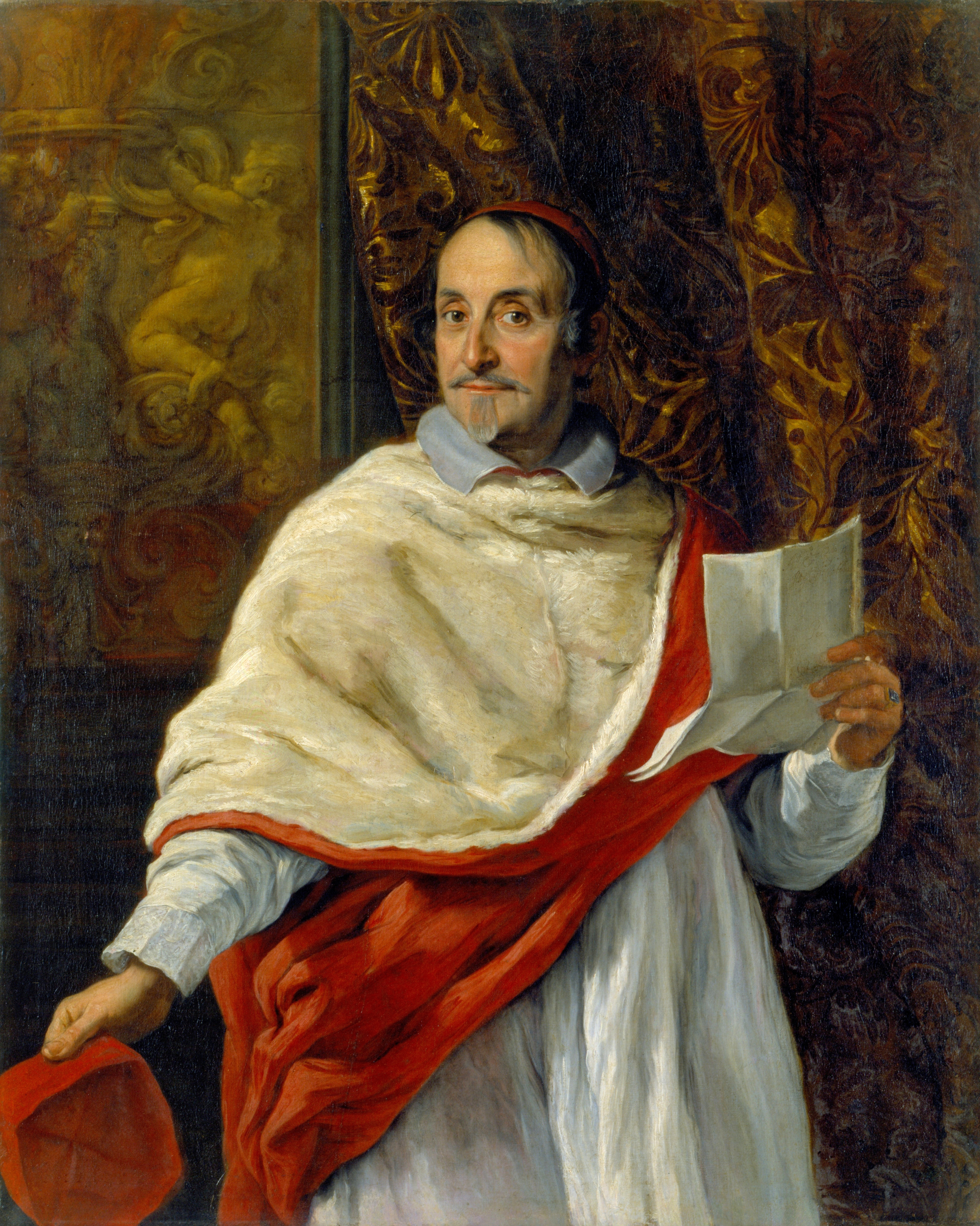
Giovanni Battista Gaulli – Portrait of the Cardinal Luigi Alessandro Omodei (c. 1670).

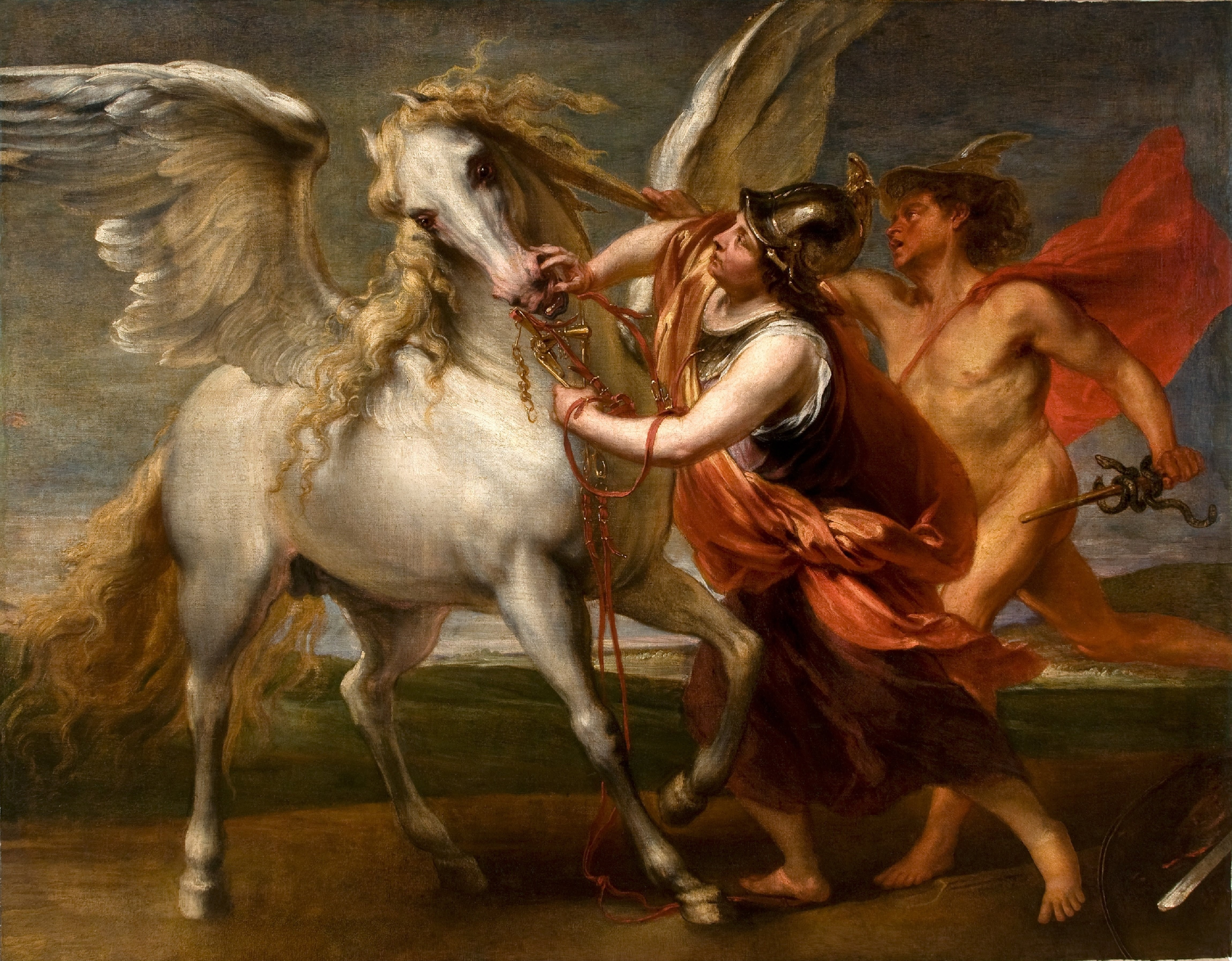
Jan Boeckhorst – Pegasus (1675–1680).

The section of international paintings of the Museu Nacional de Belas Artes represents the initial core of the museum holdings. It takes its rise from the collection of King John VI of Portugal, which was transferred to Brazil in 1808, together with the Portuguese Court. Later, the collection was expanded with the paintings brought by Joaquim Lebreton, who came to Brazil with the mission of organising the country's first art academy. Subsequent acquisitions and donations greatly enlarged the international art collection, which is today one of the most representative among South American museums. Major part of the collection is composed by European paintings, mainly French, followed by Italian, Portuguese, Spanish, Dutch and Flemish schools, and, to a lesser extent, by paintings of the Latin American countries, Canada and the United States. The earliest painting in the collection dates back to the 13th century, but most part concerns to the 19th century.

The collection of Italian paintings is notable for specific sections, such as Mannerist and Baroque artworks. Artists represented include Bartolomeo Passarotti, Luca Cambiaso, Gioacchino Assereto, Giovanni Lanfranco, Il Raffaellino, Francesco Albani, Antonio Maria Vassallo, Luciano Borzone, Simone Cantarini, Valerio Castello, Jacopo Vignali, Grechetto, Giambattista Langetti, Ciro Ferri, Francesco Cozza, Baciccio, Corrado Giaquinto, Francesco Guardi, Tiepolo and Alessandro Magnasco.

The nucleus of French paintings is mainly composed by 18th and 19th century artworks. It comprises, aside from the painters of the French Artistic Mission, names such as Jacques Courtois, Jean-Baptiste Marie Pierre, François Bonvin, Théodule Ribot, Jules Breton, Jean-Paul Laurens, Constant Troyon, Jean-Jacques Henner, Jules Dupré, Gustave Doré, Henri Harpignies, Alfred Sisley, Armand Guillaumin, Edmond Aman-Jean and Henri Martin. Among the highlights of the collections is the group of 20 paintings by Eugène Boudin, one of the largest such ensembles outside France.

The collection of Dutch, Flemish and German paintings is mainly composed by works ranging from 15th to 17th century. It includes an important group of eight Brazilian landscapes by Dutch artist Frans Post, the first landscapist of the New World. The collection also includes paintings by Joos van Cleve, Hans von Kulmbach, Jan Dirksz Both, Michiel Jansz. van Mierevelt, Jan Brueghel the Elder, Abraham Brueghel, David Teniers the Younger, Daniel Seghers, Gerard ter Borch, David Beck, Jan Steen.

Other European artists presented in the collection include Juan Pantoja de la Cruz, Bernardo Germán de Llórente and Federico de Madrazo (Spanish), Francisco de Holanda, Silva Porto, António Pedro, Columbano Bordalo Pinheiro and José Malhoa (Portuguese), Emile Claus (Belgian), Árpád Szenes (Hungarian) and Carlos Schwabe (Swiss). The Latin American painting is represented by a number of anonymous works of the Cuzco School and some modern artists, such as the Argentinians Benito Quinquela Martín and Cesáreo Bernaldo de Quirós. Also representing the art of the Americas are the Canadians Marc-Aurèle de Foy Suzor-Coté and Paul Duff.

==== Sculptures ====
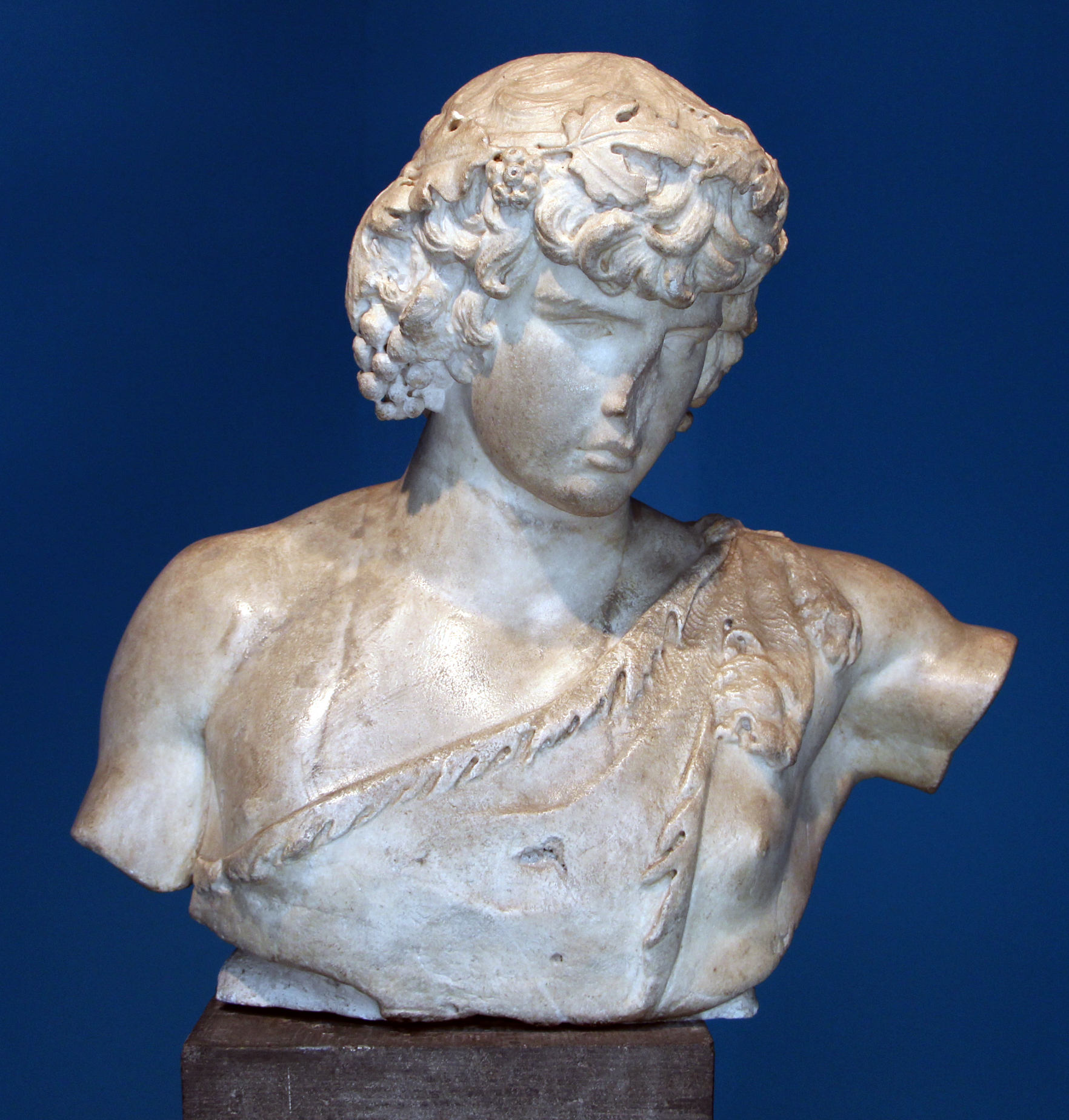
Roman sculptor. Bust of Antinous. Marble, 130-138 A.D.

The museum holds a small collection of international sculpture, most part of which dating of the 19th century. Unlike the collection of Brazilian sculpture, this group of works were not gathered through systematic acquisitions, but rather by sporadic donations and legacies. Among them, the Roman marble bust of Antinous, dating back to the 2nd century BC, as well as a Greek torso of a woman, stand out. The collection also include three bronze busts by François Rude, Constantin Meunier's The Harvester, Auguste Rodin's Meditation without Arms, and other works by Antoine-Louis Barye, António Teixeira Lopes, etc. Several works in the collection are by foreign artists active in Brazil during the 19th century, such as the French brothers Marc and Zéphyrin Ferrez and the Italian Augusto Girardet. The collection also includes a number of bronze reductions produced by artistic-industrial companies, such as Barbedienne, and a didactic collection of plaster copies of ancient Greek and Roman statues.

==== Prints ====
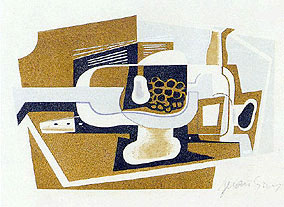
Juan Gris – Still life with guitar and bottle (1919–1922). Lithography.

The museum owns approximately 2,000 examples of international prints. Though not extensive in size, the collection is considerably diversified and eclectic, offering a brief panorama of the history of engraving in distinct civilizations. The group of Flemish, Dutch and German prints is of particular importance. Authors in the collection include Pieter de Jode I, Albrecht Dürer, Hans Sebald Beham, Cornelis Visscher, Anthony van Dyck and Rembrandt's famous Hundred Guilder Print. The French school is also well represented. In addition to works by artists such as Jacques Callot and Claude Lorrain, the museum has two albums by Gustave Doré, with woodcuts produced to illustrate newspapers, as well as 80 lithographies by Honoré Daumier, imbued with political and social criticism, published in the 1830s by the historical magazine Le Charivari.

Italian print in the collection is represented by the works of Agostino Carracci, Piranesi, Bartolozzi, Tiepolo and reproduction prints by Giovanni Folo and Raffaello Morghen. Other important engravers represented are Francisco de Goya (Los disparates), William Hogarth and Joseph Mallord William Turner. Modern prints include several works by Pablo Picasso, Joan Miró, Jacques Lipchitz, Marc Chagall, Wassily Kandinsky and Jacques Villon. Another highlight of the collection is the ensemble of more than one hundred 17th- and 18th-century Japanese woodcuts (ukiyo-e) by artists such as Utamaro and Hiroshige.

==== Drawings ====
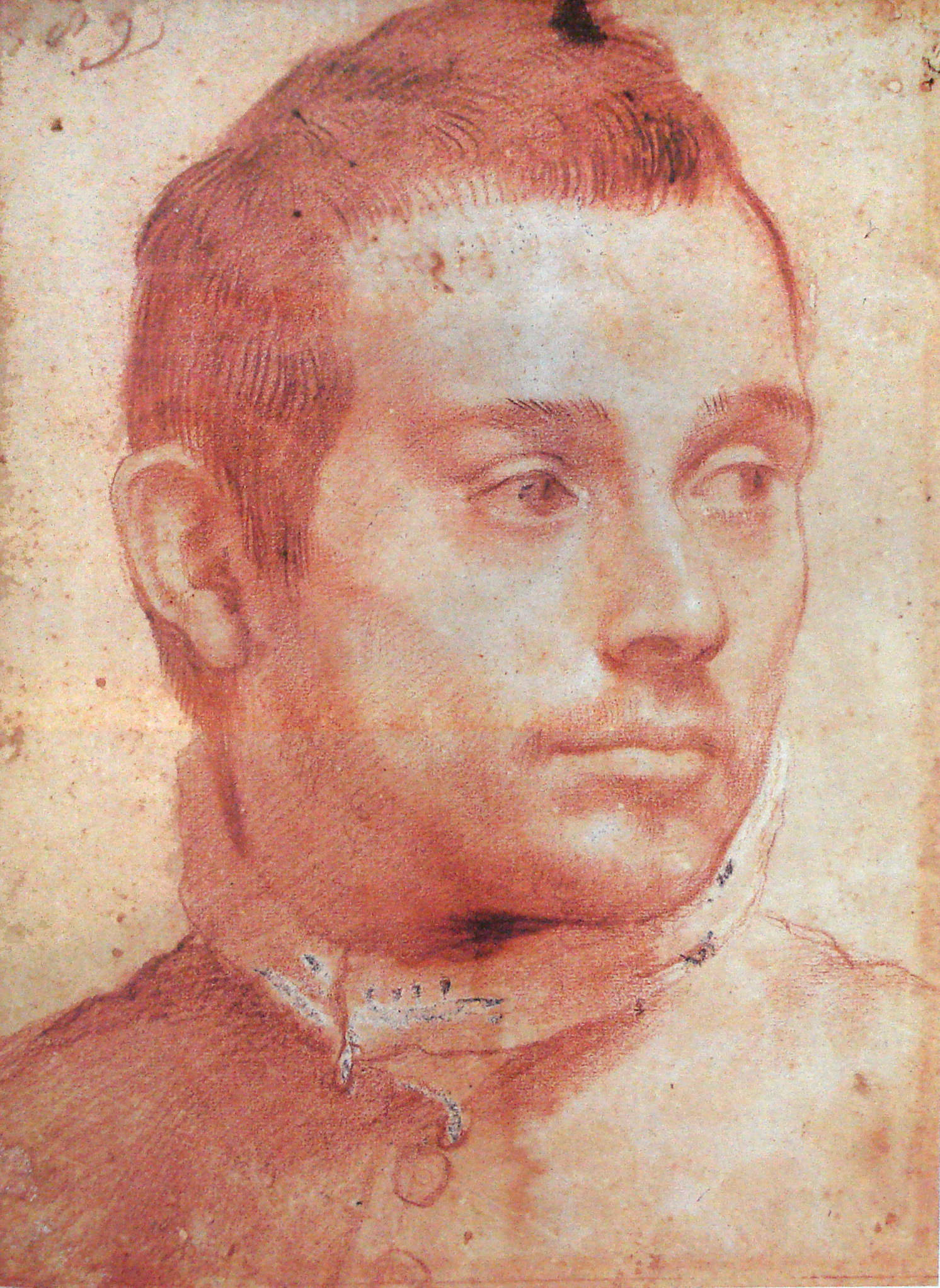
Annibale Carracci – Portrait of a man (1580–1590). Sanguine on paper.

The Museu Nacional de Belas Artes has a small but highly distinguished collection of international drawings. Most part of the pieces are of French origin, including 247 drawings by Grandjean de Montigny and other works by François Gérard, Honoré Daumier, Rosa Bonheur, Édouard Detaille, Henri-Edmond Cross and Jean-Louis Forain, etc. Other European schools well represented in the collection include Italy (Bartolomeo Cesi, Annibale Carracci, Guido Reni, Corrado Giaquinto, Giovanni Battista Tiepolo, Pompeo Batoni), Portugal (Francisco de Holanda, Domingos Sequeira, Vieira Portuense, José Malhoa), Netherlands and Germany (Paulus Potter, Johann Moritz Rugendas), among others.

=== Other collections ===
==== Brazilian folk art ====
The museum collection of folk art is composed by 442 works, attesting several ethnological aspects of the regional societies of Brazil. The collection includes works of both functional and artistic nature and its value lies in its capacity of revealing the life conditions, traditions, religiosity, recreation, aesthetic ideals, creativity and the human-nature relationship of the peoples of Brazil, as well as the regional differences concerning these issues. Popular piety and other aspects of Religion in Brazil are well documented in the collection, which includes many examples of ex-votos, clay and wood statuary, etc. Manuel Eudócio, Zé Caboclo and Mestre Cândido are some of the artisans represented in the collection.

==== African art ====
The museum collection of African art is composed by wood carvings, masks, ceremonial objects, functional objects, ivory and bronze sculptures, textiles, body ornaments, and other items related to several ethnic groups, most part of which indigenous to Western Africa, more specifically, to the Bight of Benin. The collection is of particular importance for its coherent geographical unity, which allows the identification of interethnic flows among groups such as the Ashanti, Bassa, Baoulé, Dan, Bambara, Fon, Fulani, Senufo, Yoruba, and unidentified groups of Benin. It is, therefore, an important register of the common symbols of political, social and economic power, concerning the Pan-African theories. Other important aspect of the collection is the fact that several artworks, mainly of devotional nature, are closely related to Afro-Brazilian culture.

== Selections from the permanent collection ==
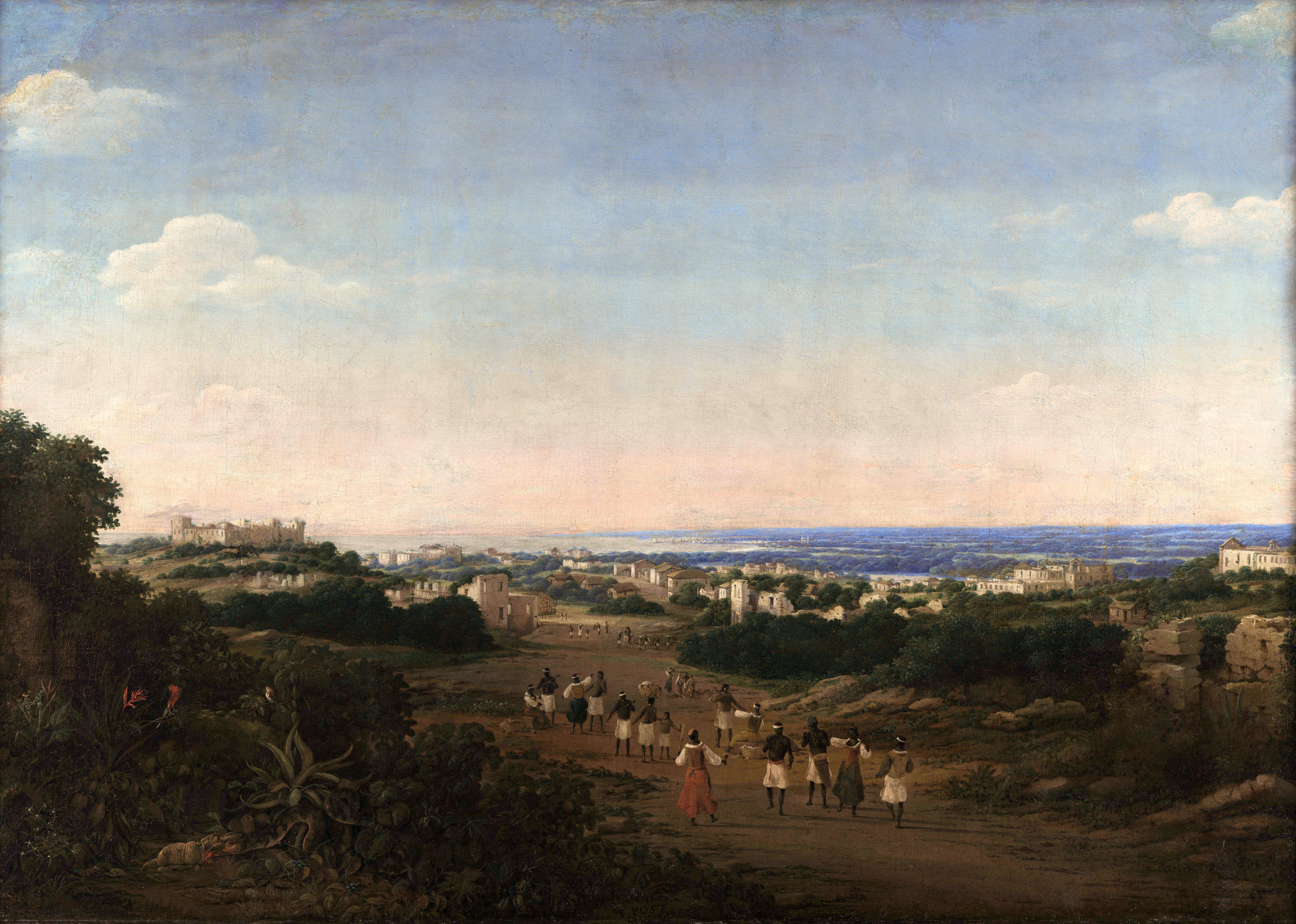
Frans Post, Olinda, 17th century

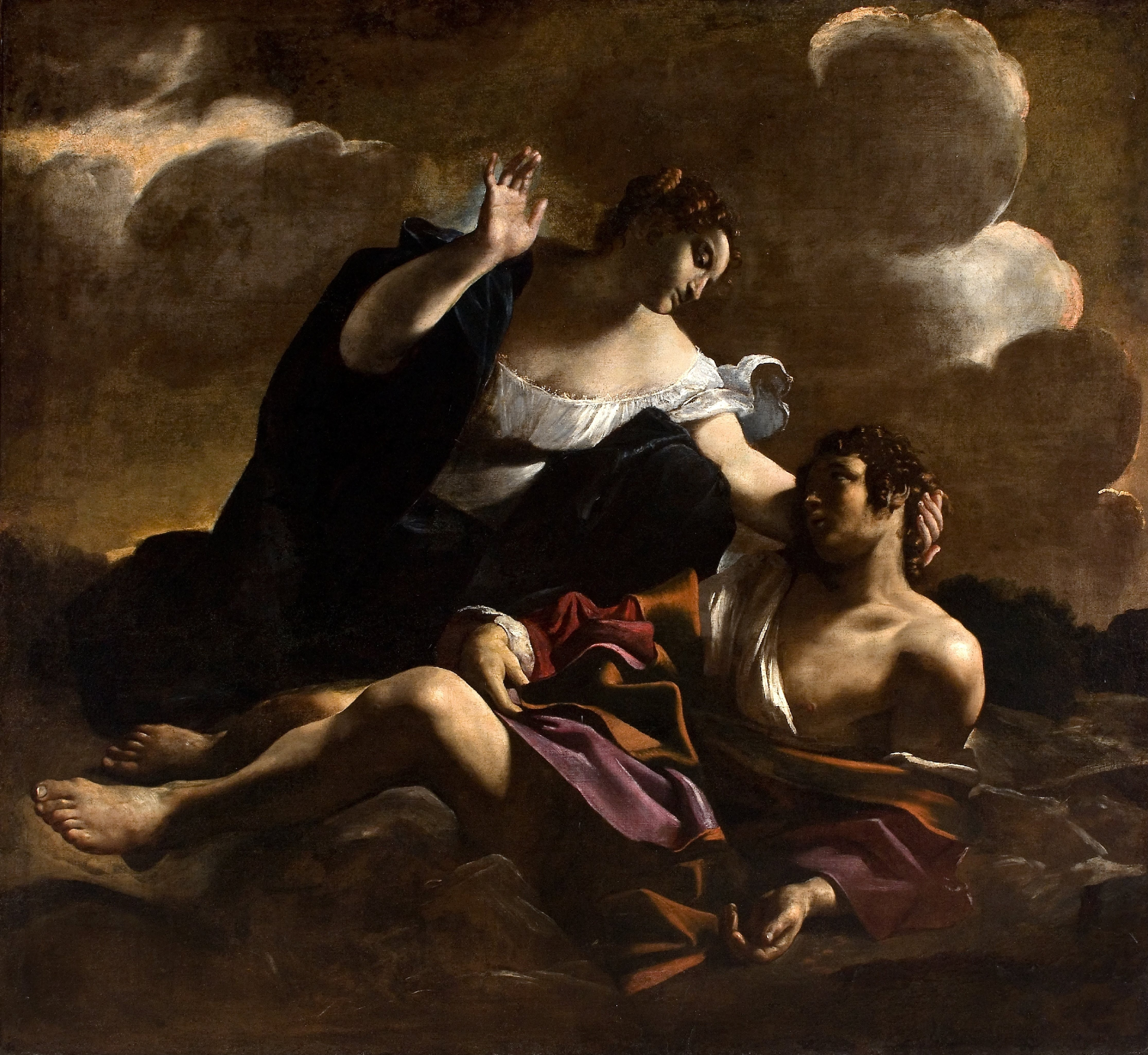
Giovanni Lanfranco, Angelica and Medoro, 1633–1634

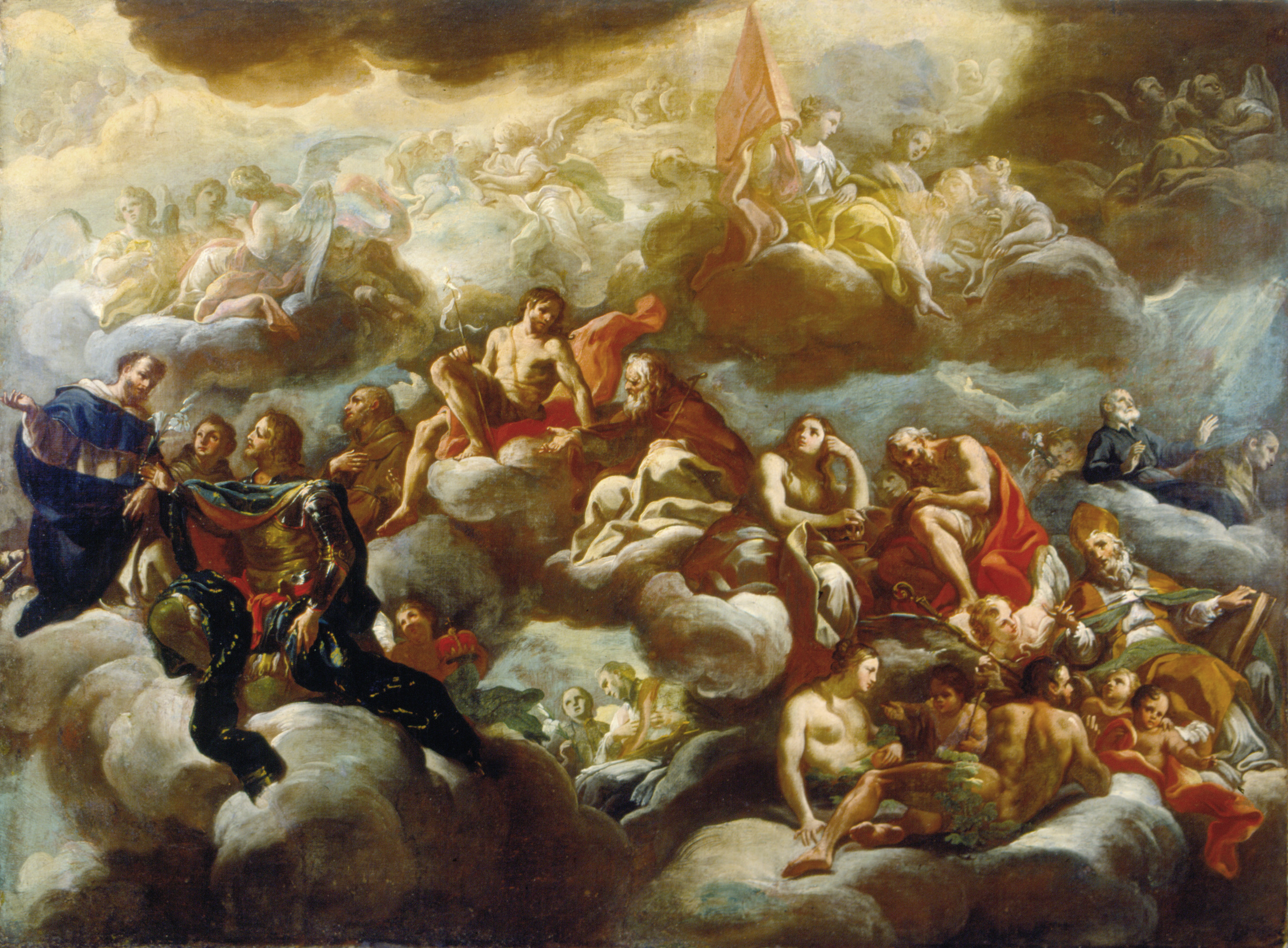
Corrado Giaquinto, Apotheosis of St. Nicholas, 1733

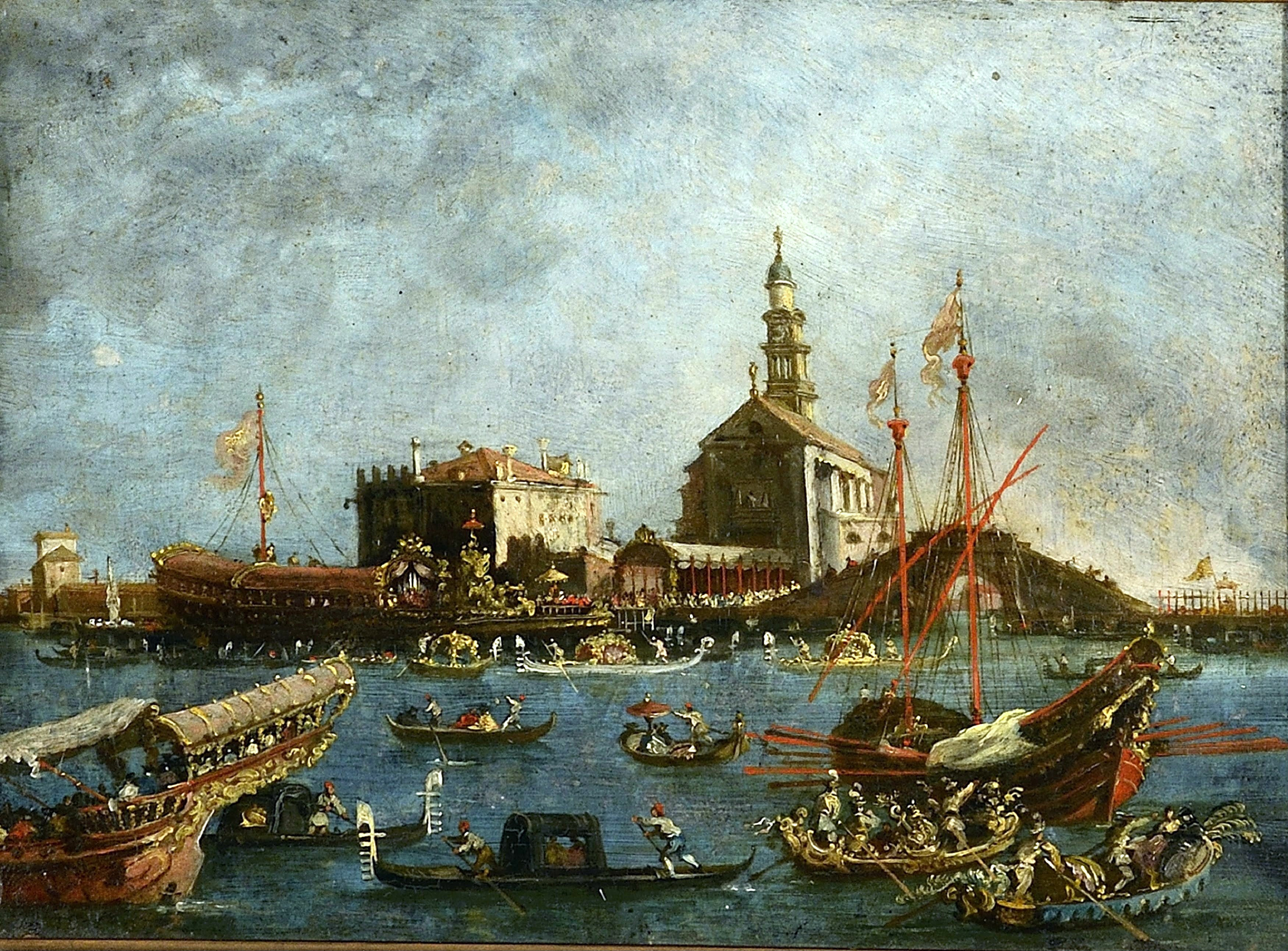
Francesco Guardi, Venice, 1760–1773

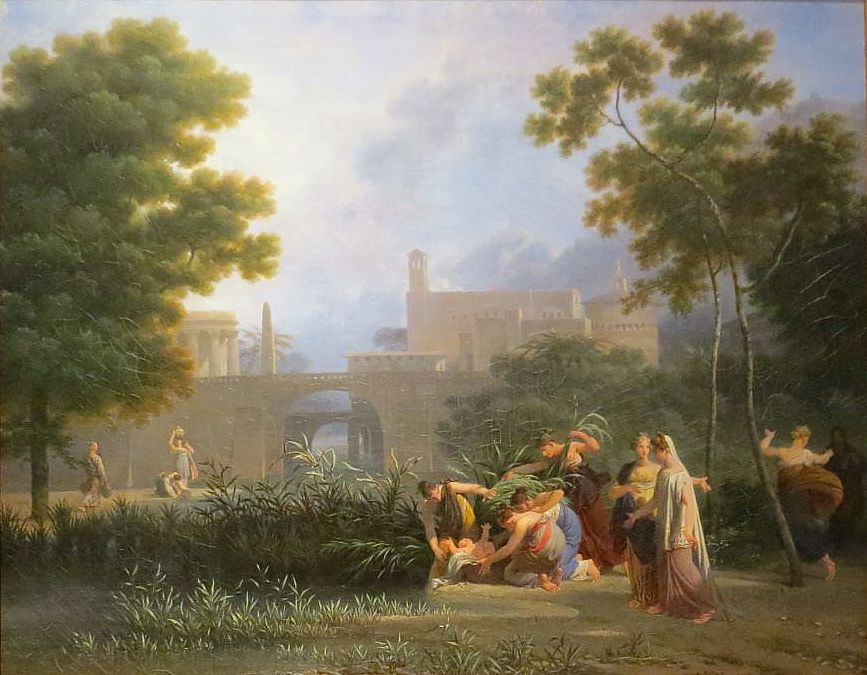
Nicolas-Antoine Taunay, Moses Rescued from the Water, c. 1827

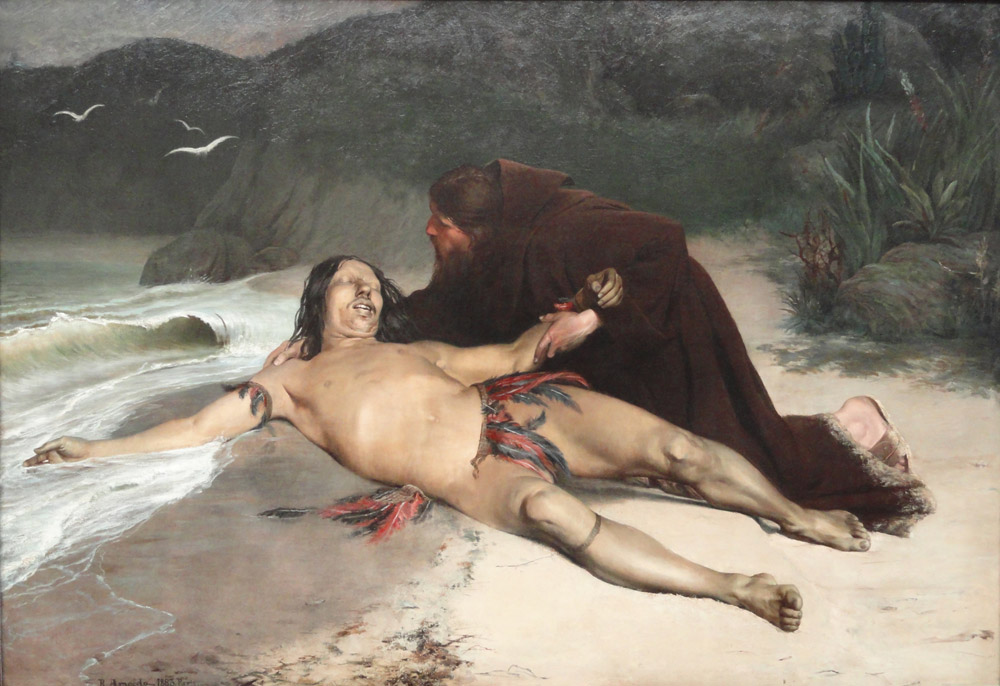
Rodolfo Amoedo, The Last Tamoyo, 1883

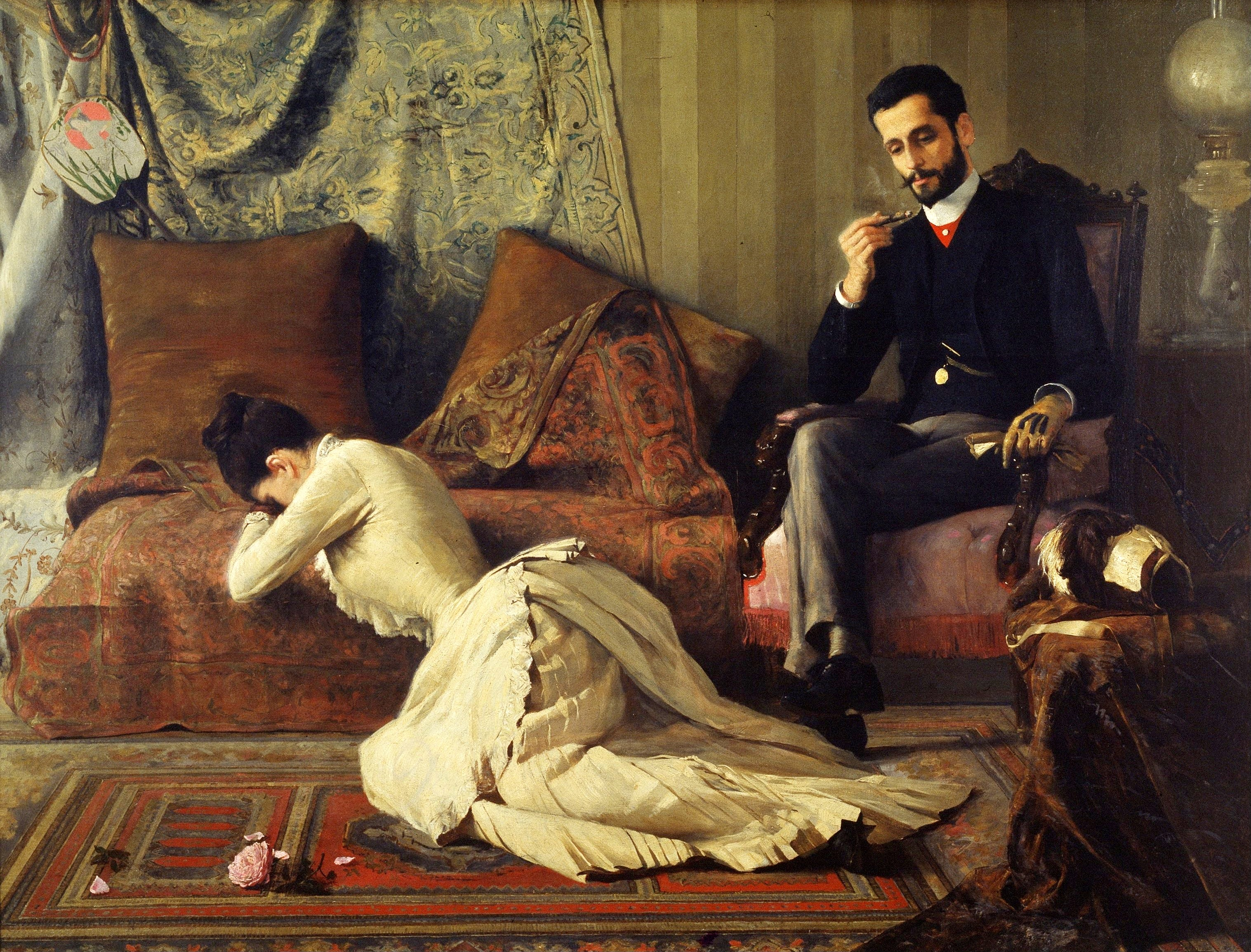
Belmiro de Almeida, The Spat, 1887

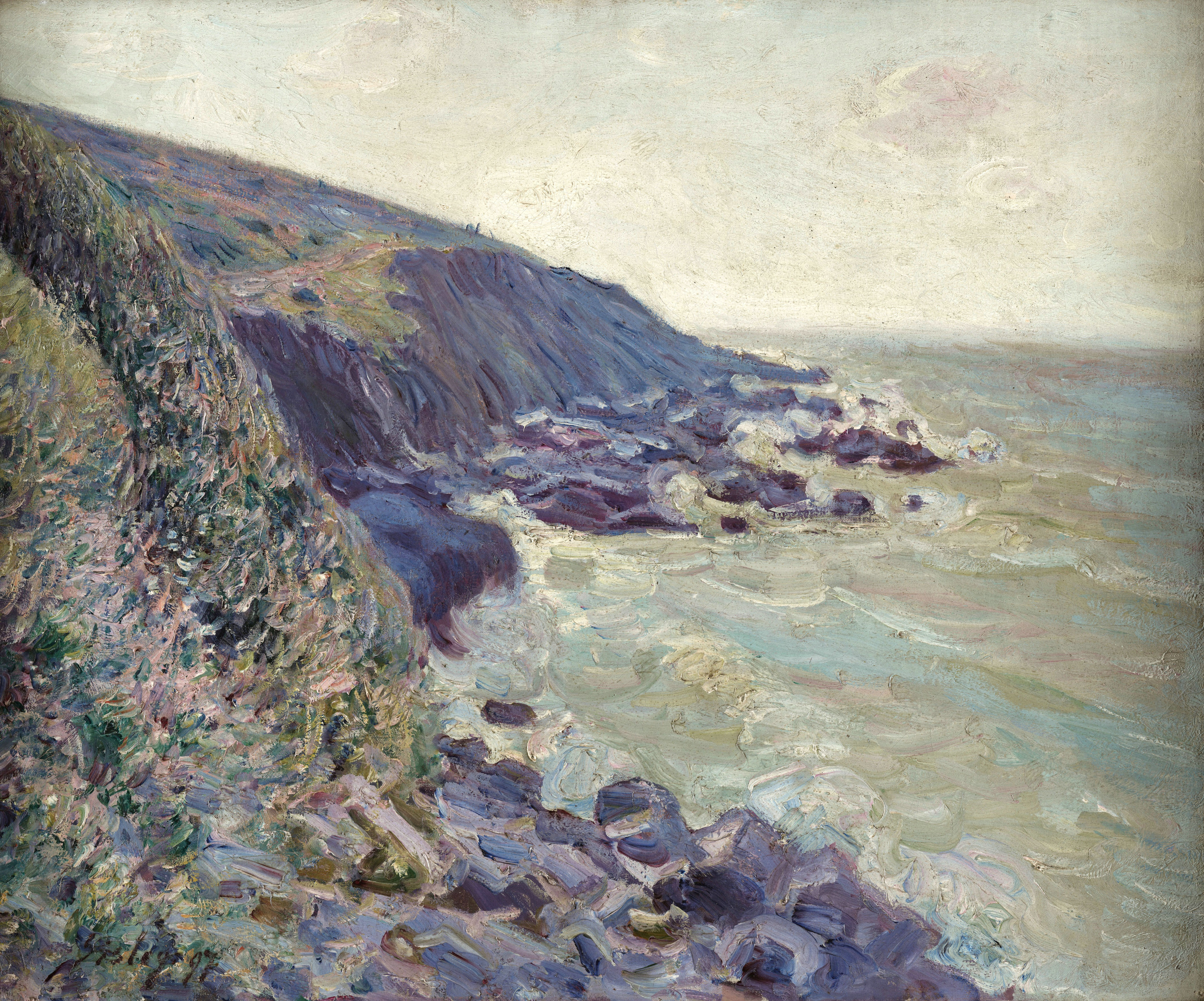
Alfred Sisley, Windstorm, 1897

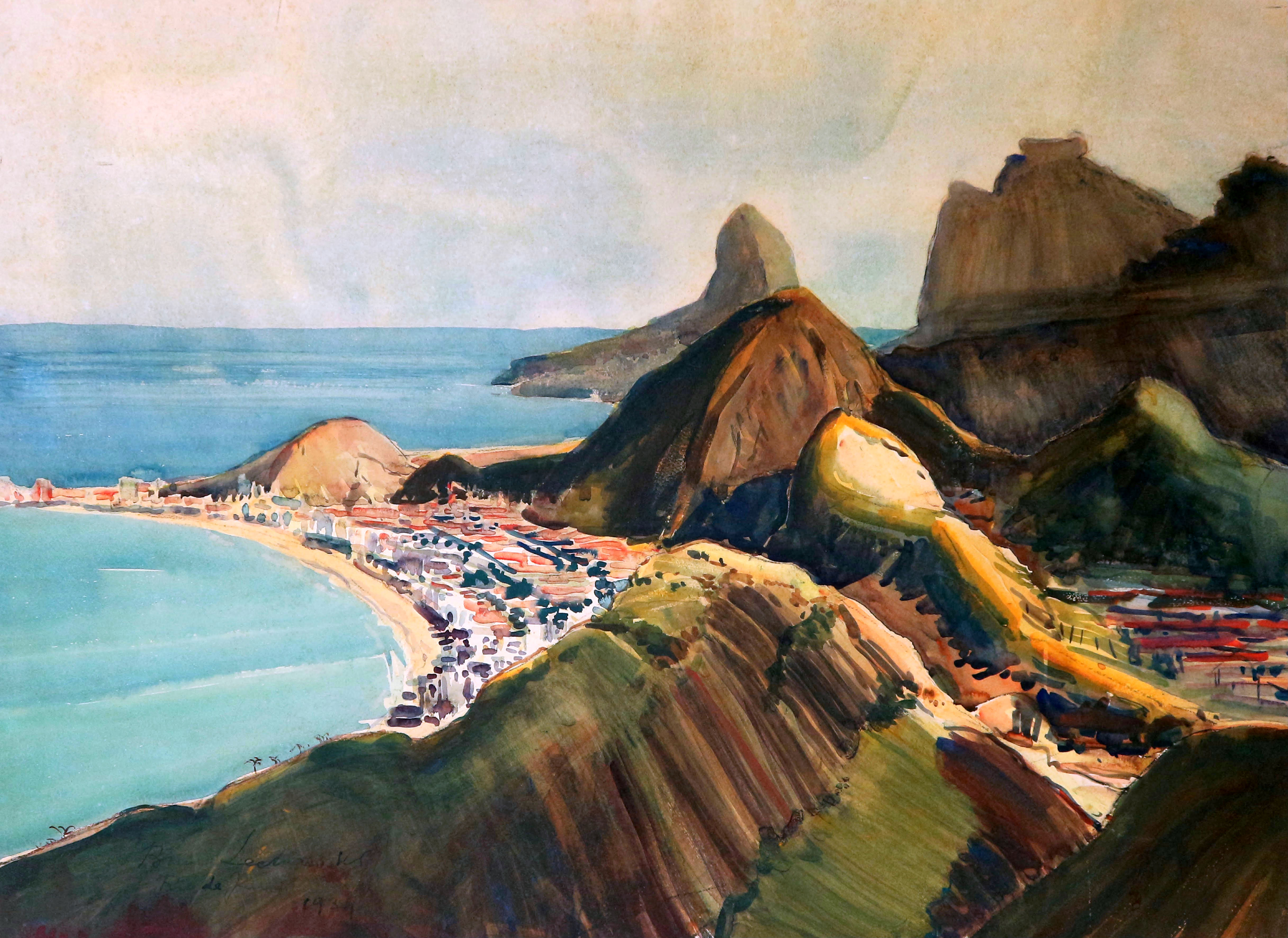
Bruno Lechowski – Rio de Janeiro, Capital of Beauty, 1939
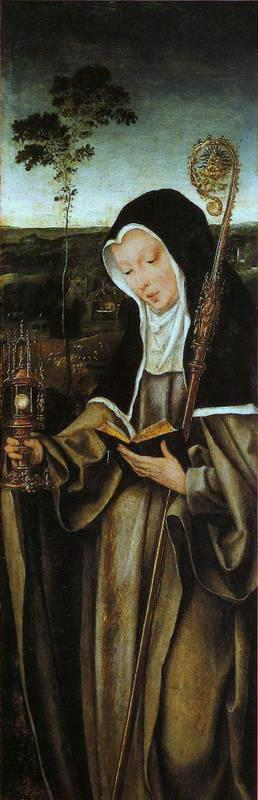
Joos van Cleve (attrib.), Saint Clare, 15th century.

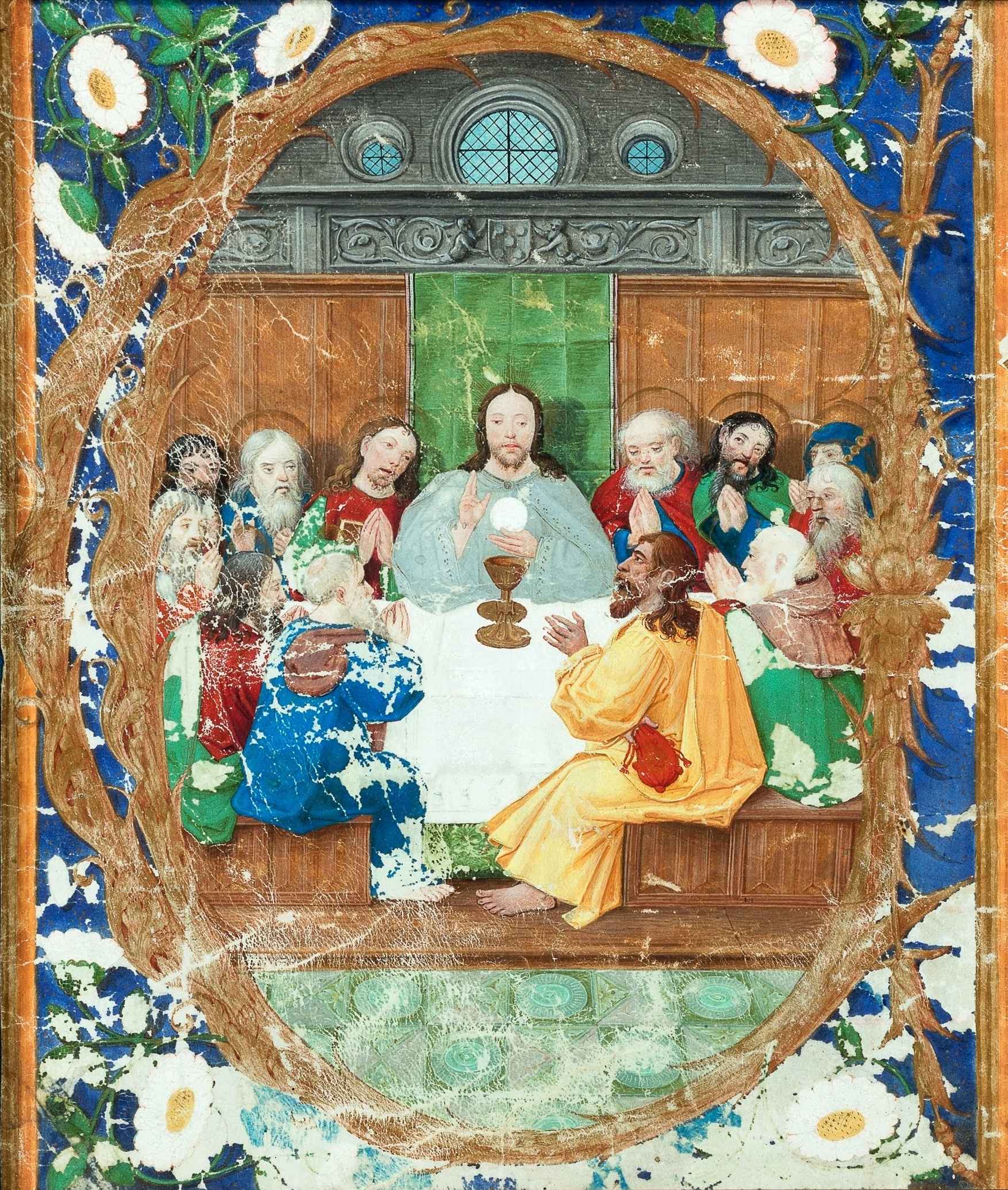
Francisco de Holanda (attrib.), The Lord's Supper, 16th century.

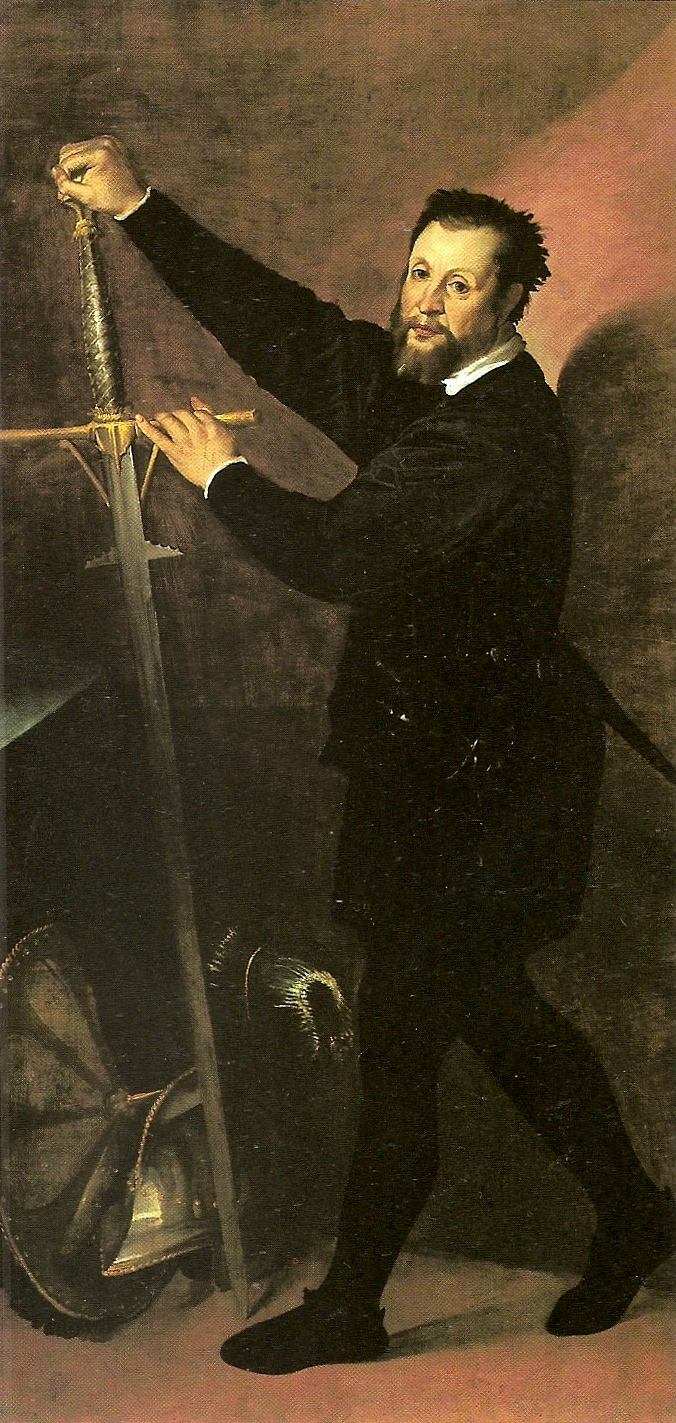
Bartolomeo Passarotti, Portrait of a man with a sword, 1565–1570

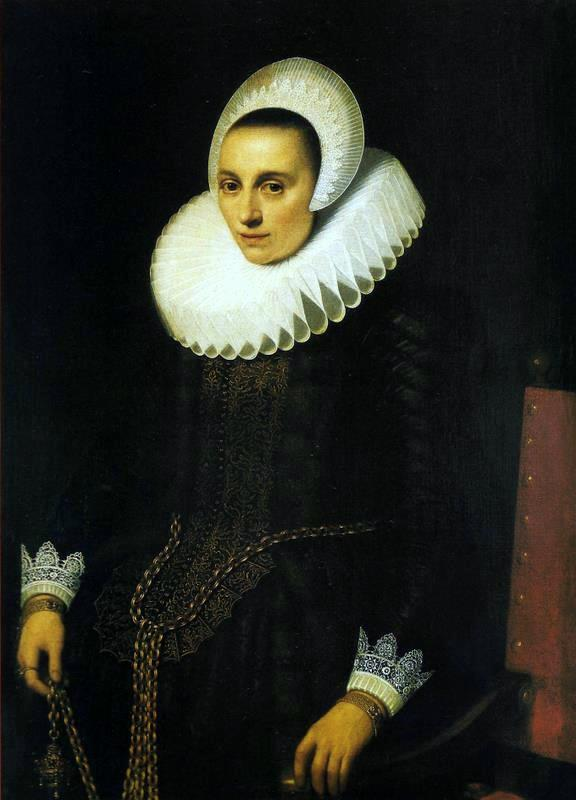
Michiel Jansz. van Mierevelt, Portrait of a Dutch noblewoman, 17th century

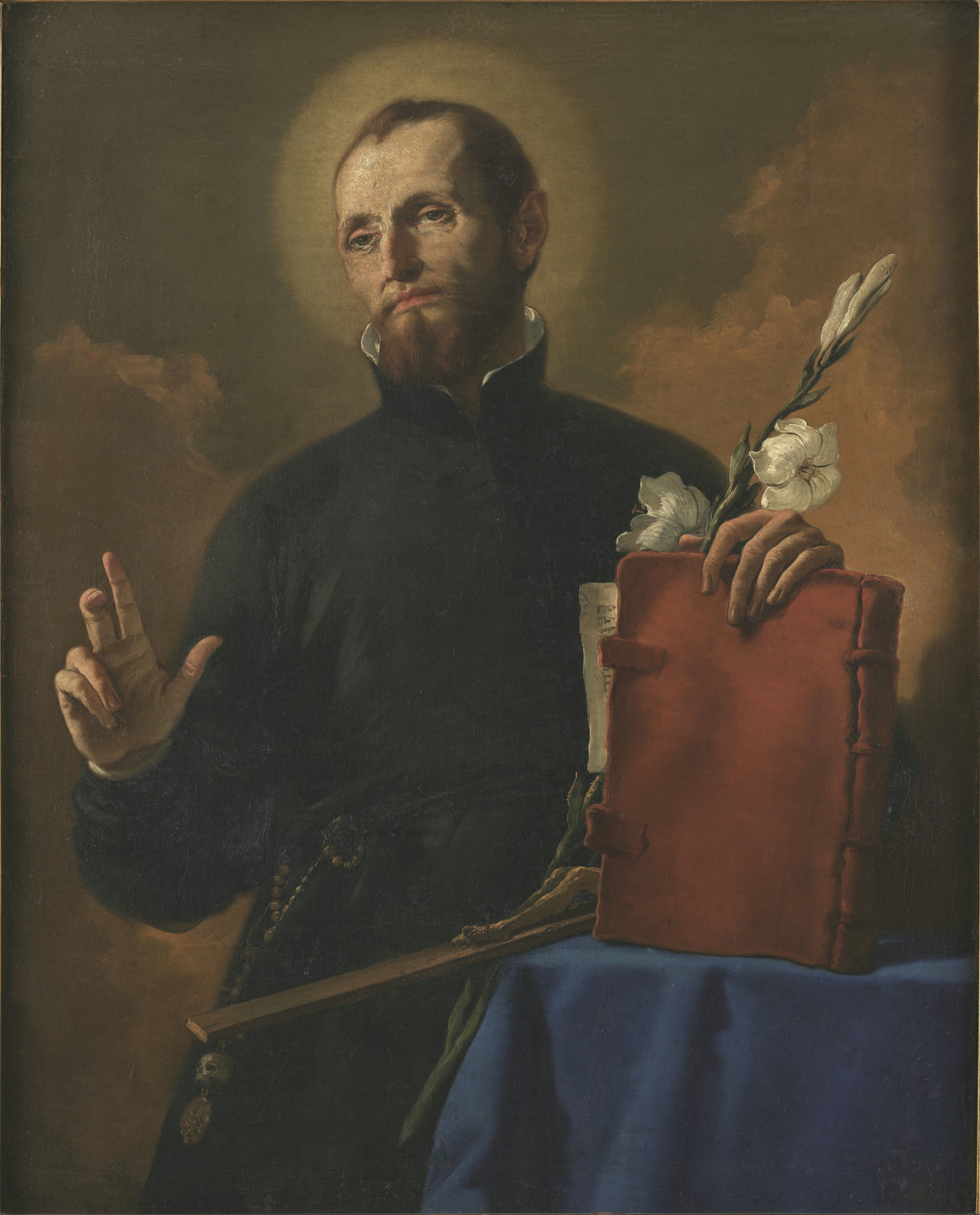
Giovanni Battista Tiepolo, Saint Cajetan, 1710–1736

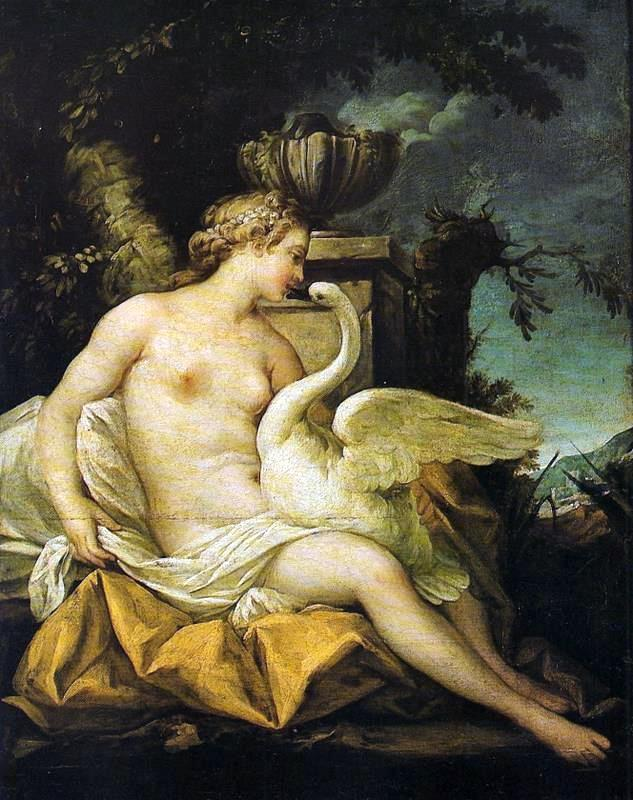
Jean-Baptiste Marie Pierre, Leda and the Swan, 18th century

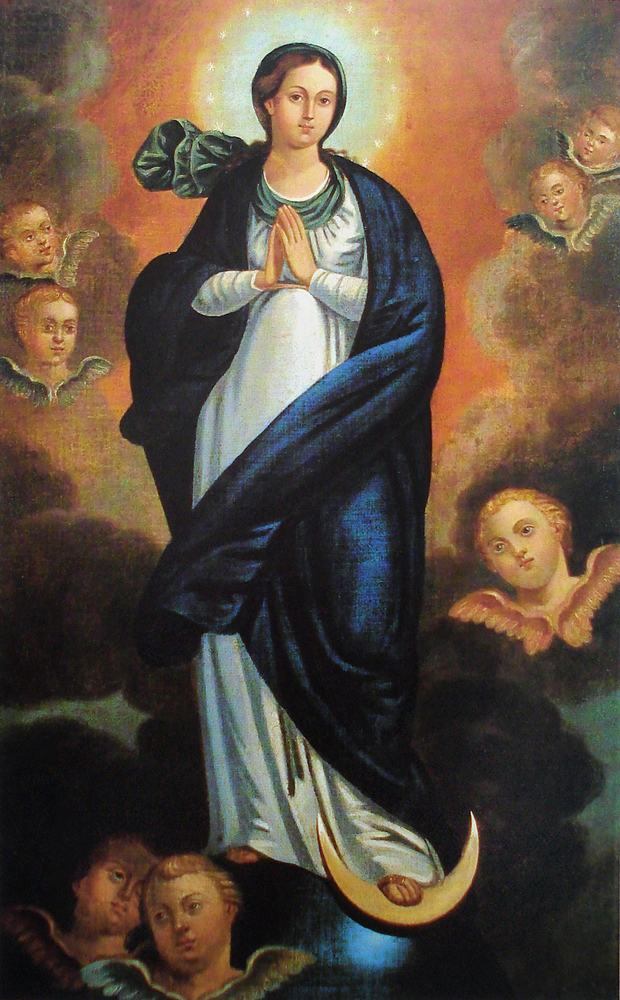
Manuel da Cunha, Our Lady of Conception, 1780–1800

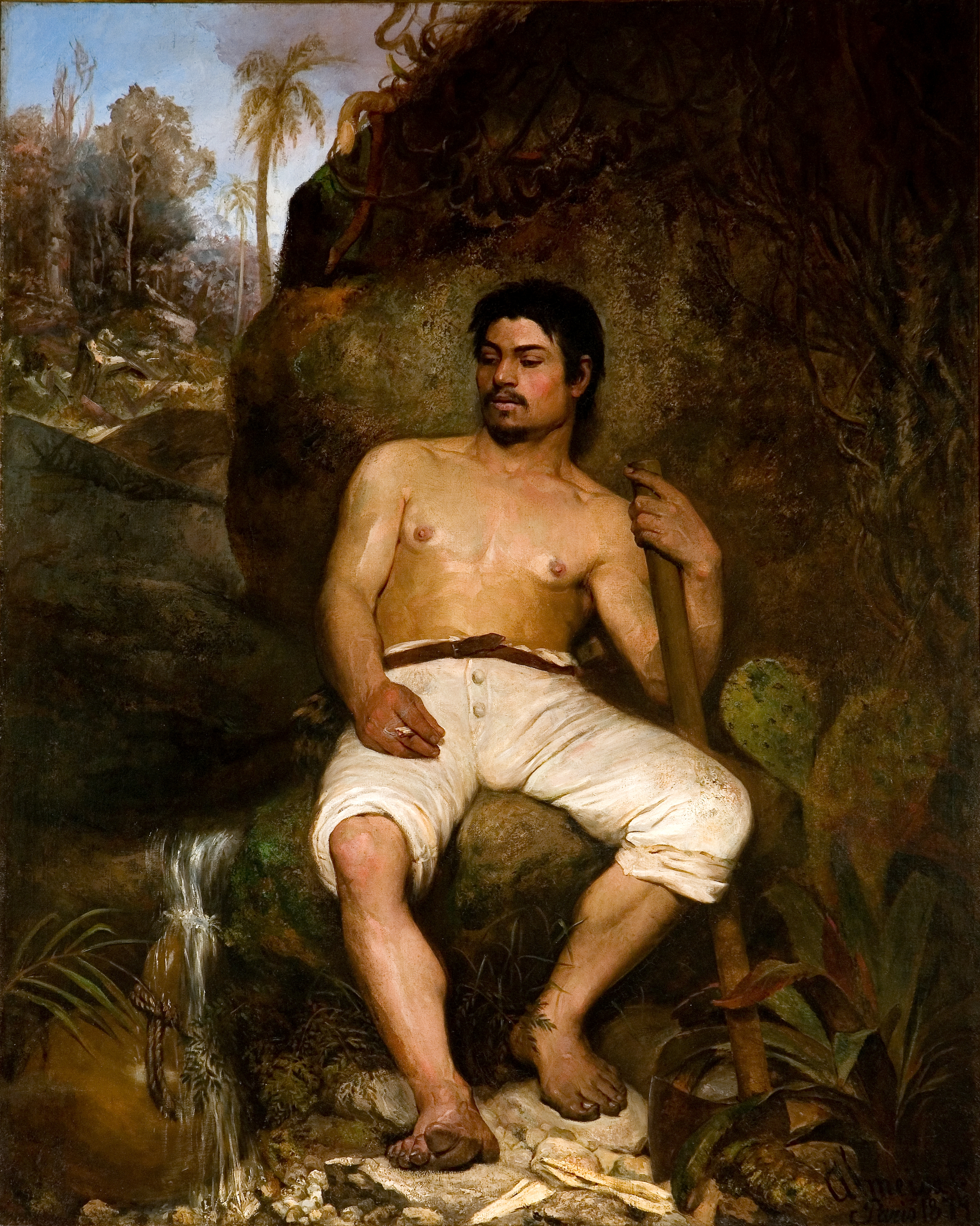
José Ferraz de Almeida Júnior, The Brazilian Lumberjack, 1875

== See also ==
- São Paulo Museum of Art
- Pinacoteca do Estado de São Paulo
- Rio Grande do Sul Museum of Art
