= Djanira =

Brazilian artist and engraver (1914–1979)

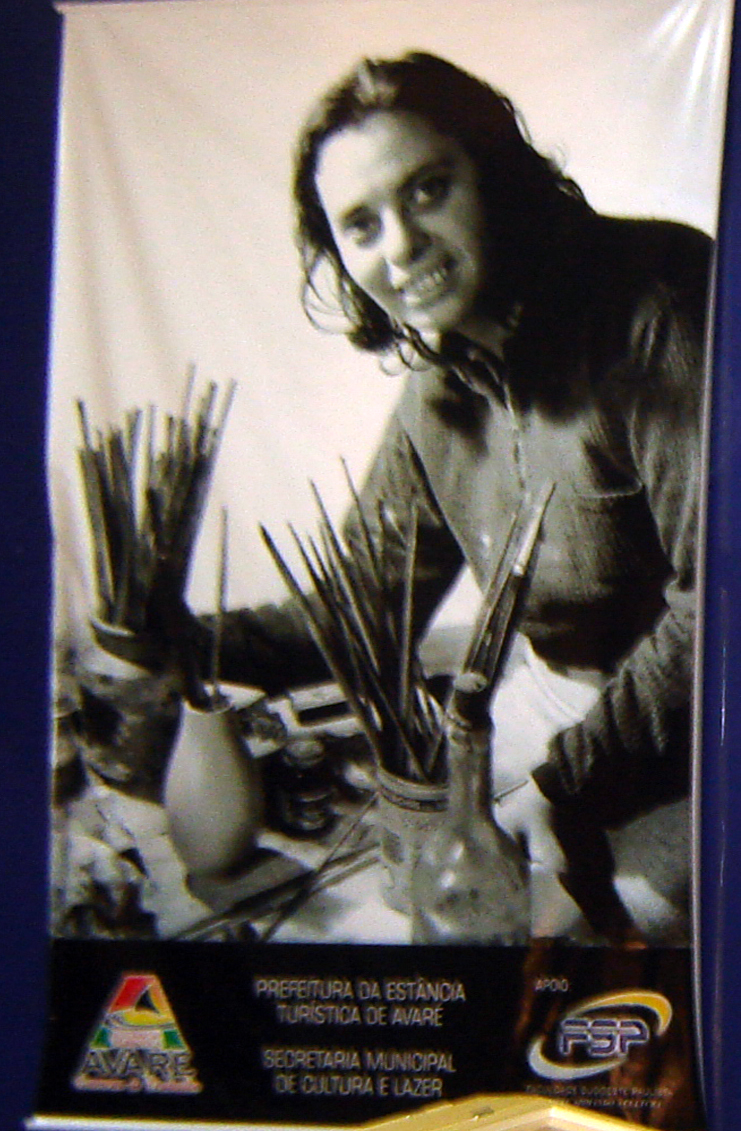
- Born: Djanira da Motta e Silva; 20 June 1914; Avaré, São Paulo
- Died: 31 May 1979 (aged 64); Rio de Janeiro, Rio de Janeiro
- Known for: Painting, drawing, engraving
- Spouse(s): Bartolomeu Gomes Pereira; José Shaw da Motta e Silva

Djanira da Motta e Silva (20 June 1914, in Avaré – 31 May 1979, in Rio de Janeiro), known artistically as just Djanira, was a Brazilian painter, illustrator and engraver. She was known for her naïve art paintings, depicting Brazilian common people, religious themes and landscapes.

== Biography ==
Djanira was born in Avaré, daughter of a Guaraní descent father, Oscar [de] Paiva, and an Austrian-born mother. She was registered at her birth under the name Pia Job Paiva.

At 23, she was hospitalized with tuberculosis in São José dos Campos where she made her first drawing: Christ on Golgotha. As her health improved, she continued treatment in Rio de Janeiro, residing in Santa Teresa, because of its clean air. In 1930, she rented a small house in the neighborhood and installed a family pension. One of her guests, the painter Emeric Mercier, encouraged her and gave her painting lessons. Djanira also attended a night drawing course at the Liceu de Artes e Ofícios. In this period she kept in touch with the couple Arpad Szenes and Maria Helena Vieira da Silva, with Milton Dacosta, Carlos Scliar, and others living in Santa Teresa and attending the art world.

In the late 1930s, in the state capital, she had her first evening drawing classes in art instruction in the School of Arts and Crafts and the painter Emeric Mercier, a tenant Djanira hosts in Santa Teresa. She had contact with the artists Carlos Scliar, Milton Dacosta, Árpád Szenes, Maria Helena Vieira da Silva and Jean-Pierre Chabloz, regulars of the pension, which provided a stimulating environment and eventually led to her exhibition at the 48th National Salon of Fine Arts in 1942. In the following year, she held her first solo show in the Brazilian Press Association (ABI). In 1945, she traveled to New York where she saw the work of Pieter Bruegel and came into contact with Fernand Léger, Joan Miró and Marc Chagall. Back in Brazil, she created the Candomblé mural for the residence of the writer Jorge Amado, in Salvador, and a panel for the Liceu Municipal de Petropolis. Between 1953 and 1954, she traveled to study in the Soviet Union.

Her paintings of the 40s are usually dark, using subdued tones, such as gray, brown and black, but with a proclivity for geometric forms of discipline. In the following decade, her palette diversified with vibrant colors, and some works deal with tonal gradations ranging from white to light gray. She presents in her human types an expression of solemn dignity.

At the end of the 1950s, she painted Canela Indians of Maranhão. In 1950 during her stay in Salvador she met José Shaw da Motta e Silva, the Motinha, civil servant, born in Salvador on 29 January 1920. She got married in Rio de Janeiro on 15 May 1952, and changed her name to Djanira da Motta e Silva.

Back to Rio de Janeiro, she was one of the leaders of the Salão Preto e Branco movement, an artists' protest against the high prices of the painting material. In 1963, she created the tile panel Santa Barbara for the tunnel in the Santa Barbara chapel, Orange, Rio de Janeiro. In the year 1966, the Cultrix company published an album of poems and silkscreen prints from Djanira. In 1977, the National Museum of Fine Arts held a major retrospective of her work.

In the 1970s, she went to the Santa Catarina coal mines to experience closely the miners' lives, and traveled to Itabira, Minas Gerais to see the iron extraction service. In 1972, she became a nun of the Carmelite Order.

Djanira still worked with woodcuts, engraving, and made drawings for tapestries and tiles. In production, there is the monumental tile panel for tunnel Santa Barbara chapel (1958) in Rio de Janeiro. Initially called "primitive", her work has gradually achieved greater critical acclaim. As pointed out by the art critic Mário Pedrosa (1900–1981), Djanira is an artist who does not improvise and, although they have a naive and instinctive appearance, her works are the result of careful preparation.
