= Giovanni Maria Bottala =

Italian painter (1613–1644)

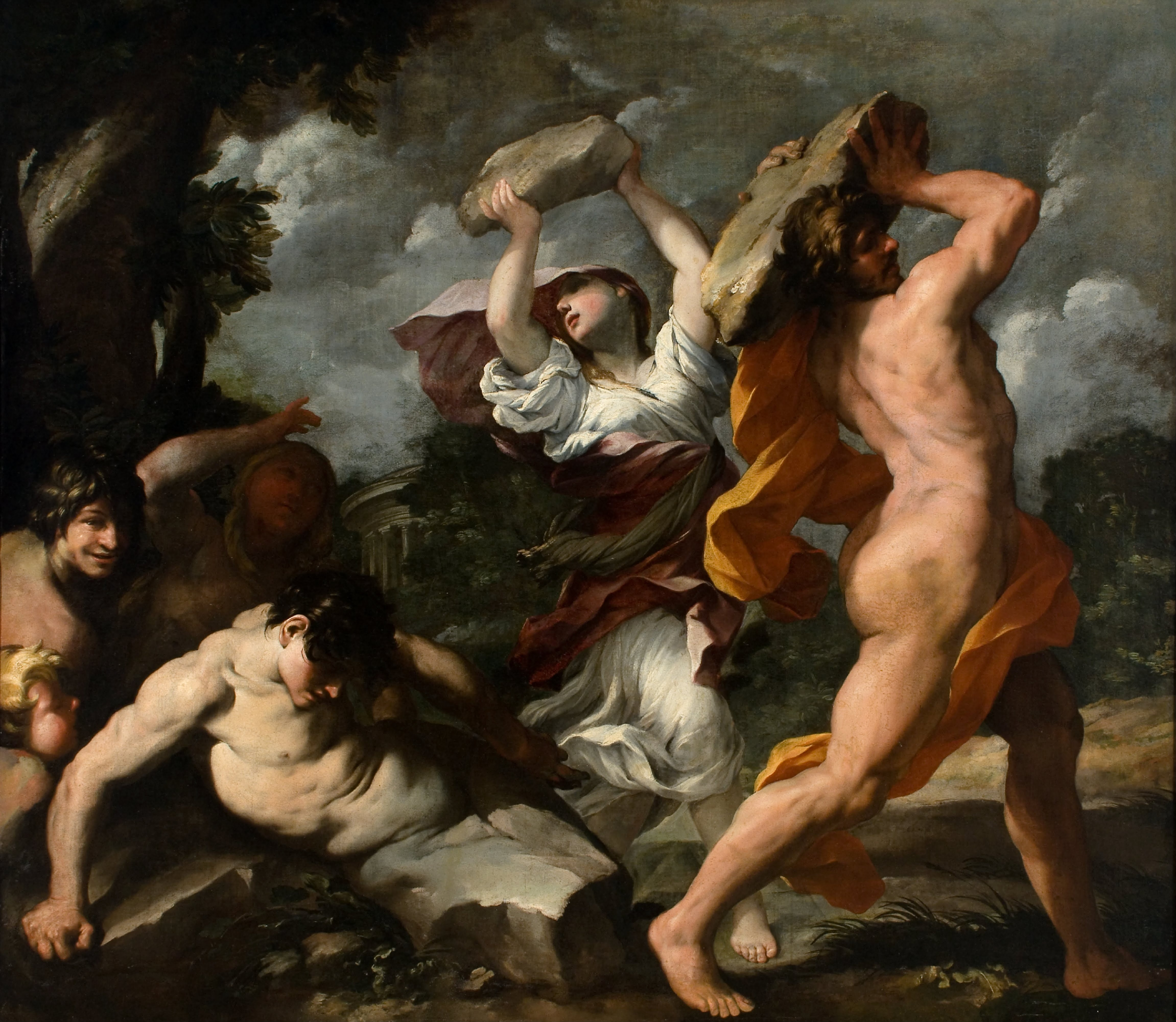
Deucalion and Pyrrha (c. 1635). Painting by Giovanni Maria Bottalla (Museu Nacional de Belas Artes, Rio de Janeiro)

Giovanni Maria Bottala (1613–1644) was an Italian painter active in the Baroque period.

He was born in Savona. He travelled to Rome as a young boy, and later became pupil of Pietro da Cortona in Rome. He painted in Rome, Naples, and Genoa. He was taken into the patronage of Cardinal Giulio Sacchetti, for whom he painted a Meeting of Jacob and Esau. Bottala acquired the name of 'Rafaellino,' from his great veneration for the works of Raphael. Other works are in the churches of Naples and Genoa. He died at Milan.
