= Gustavo Capanema =

Brazilian politician (1900–1985)

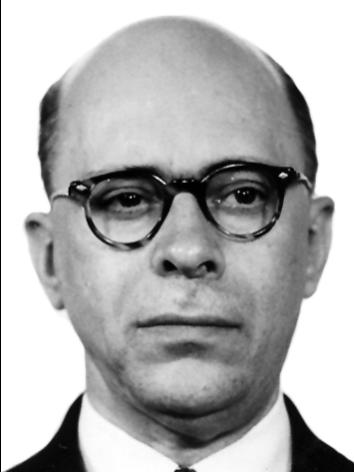

18th President of Minas Gerais
- In office 5 September 1933 – 15 December 1933
- Preceded by: Olegário Maciel
- Succeeded by: Benedito Valadares

Minister of Education and Health of Brazil
- In office 23 July 1934 – 30 October 1945
- Preceded by: Washington Ferreira Pires
- Succeeded by: Raul Leitão da Cunha

Senator for Minas Gerais
- In office 1 February 1971 – 31 January 1979

Federal Deputy for Minas Gerais
- In office 5 February 1946 – 1 February 1971

Personal details
- Born: Gustavo Capanema Filho; 10 August 1900 Pitangui, Minas Gerais, Brazil
- Died: 10 March 1985 (aged 84) Rio de Janeiro, Brazil
- Party: PP (1933–1937) PSD (1945–1966) ARENA (1966–1979)
- Occupation: Lawyer

Gustavo Capanema Filho (10 August 1900 – 10 March 1985) was a Brazilian politician. He served as Minister of Education and Health for 11 years (1933–1945) during the presidency of Getúlio Vargas, the longest-serving Minister of Education of the country. He also served as federal deputy for Minas Gerais (1946–1971) and senator (1971–1979) for the same state.
