= László Ney =

Hungarian graphic artist

- Born: László Ney; 26 July 1900; Budapest, Hungary
- Died: 1965; Paris, France

László Ney (also known as Lancelot Ney) (26 July 1900, Budapest - 1965, Paris) was a Hungarian graphic artist.

He was a successful caricaturist already in his early life. In the Hungarian College of Fine Arts his teacher was István Réti. At the age of 22 he went to Germany to study abroad. In Germany he got to know Moholy-Nagy and through him Kurt Schwitters. First he worked as a graphic artist then as a painter. Michel Seuphor was a friend of his and he introduced Mondrian to Ney.

In 1921 he married Rózsi Földy who then become Rózsi (Rosie) Ney.

In 1923 he settled in Paris. He worked first as a graphic artist and then as a painter. He met Mondrian through his friend Michel Seuphor. Featured in Salon des Réalités Nouvelles, Salon du Mai, etc. exhibitions, but also organized numerous individual exhibitions of his works in Paris and other large cities of Western Europe.

In 1956 an exhibition was held at MIT from his works. The following text was provided to media outlets to promote the exhibition:

"A painter of the School of Paris—Lancelot Ney—will have his first one-man show in the United States at Massachusetts Institute of Technology. The exhibition, consisting of thirty-four oils, will be held in the New Gallery of the Hayden Memorial Library May 23 through July 1. (...) Principally an abstract painter, Ney, however, champions the right of the artist to maintain flexibility of approach to this art; in fact, he believes it is the artist's duty to remain free and unencumbered by strict rules and formulas of expression. Of this work Ney says, 'My nonfigurative paintings are culmination, and accumulation of my experience, created (at least in the present stage of my development) with the backlog of figurative paintings. And, in living my plastic experience, I seek no doctrine which would eliminate any facet of my work, for the very imposition of theory seems to stultify experiment.'"

First he made objective cubist pictures then more abstract compositions. Beside figural pictures he made abstract painting, ink drawings, etchings. In his last years he studied more than 500 Chinese characters under the influence of them and Far Eastern art he made brush drawings.
