= Árpád Szenes =

Hungarian-Jewish abstract painter (1897–1985)

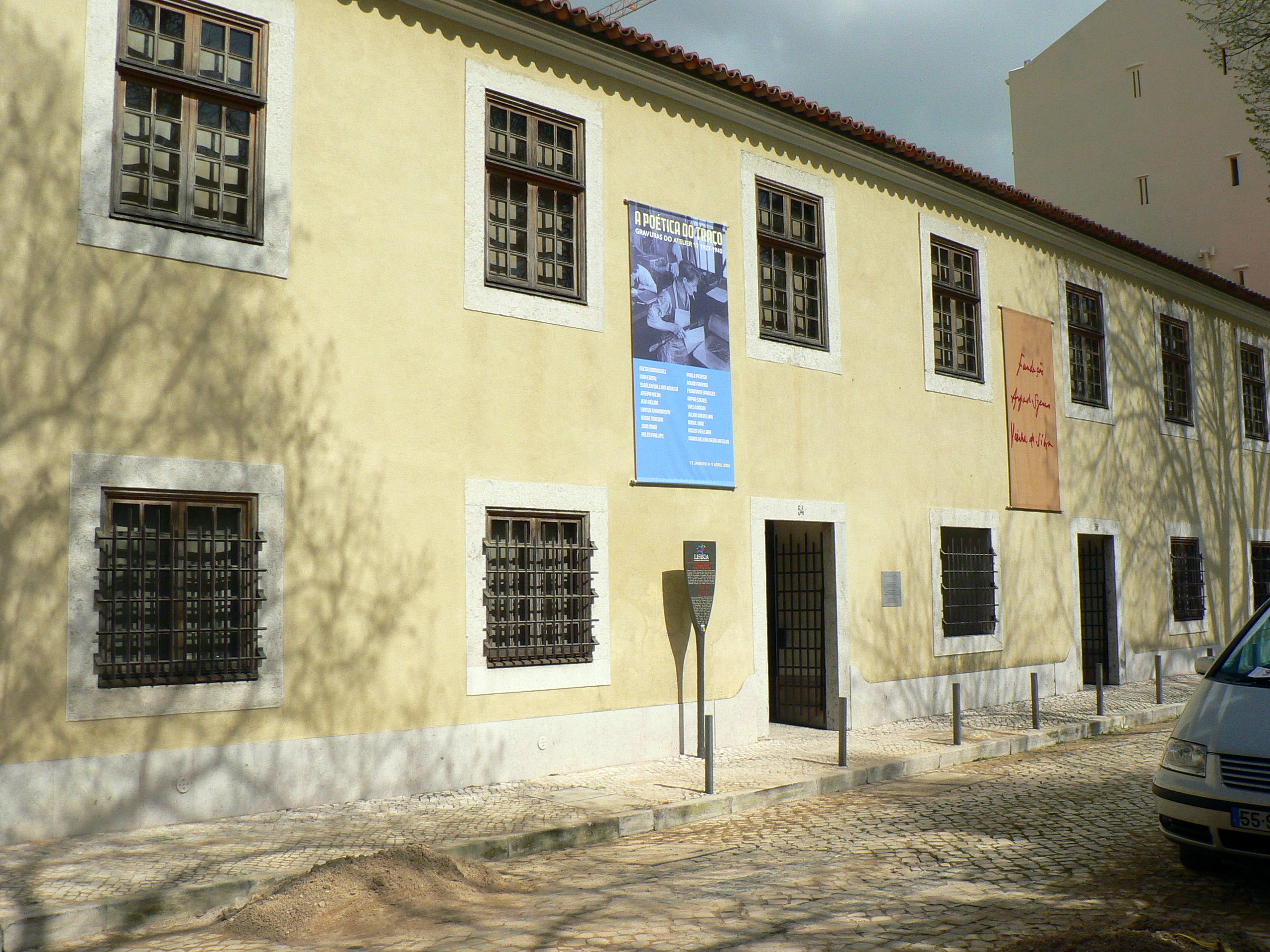
The museum and foundation building in Lisbon

Árpád Szenes (also French: Arpad Szenès; 6 May 1897 – 16 January 1985) was a Hungarian-Jewish abstract painter who worked in France.

== Biography ==
In 1897, Szenes was born into a petty bourgeois family in Budapest. Many artists including Arthur Bárdos, Ignotus, Lajos Hatvany were guests at the family's home. He went to the Munkácsy Mihály Street Secondary Grammar School and was taught among others by Milán Füst. He was passionate about drawing. He served in World War I, but he was not deployed to the front; he painted portraits on the graves of heroic fallen soldiers from photos. Here he was recognized by the sculptor Dezső Bokros Birman, who directed him towards modern art. He enrolled in the free school of József Rippl-Rónai, where Béla Iványi-Grünwald and Károly Kernstok had great influence on him.

In 1919 he worked with his fellow painters at the Artist Colony of Kecskemét. Since they did not receive money, they had to do agricultural work. He painted together among others with Gyula Derkovits, Béla Iványi-Grünwald, János Kmetty, Róbert Emil Novotny and Pál Pátzay. He was ill with hard physical work, and moved with two friends to a business premise in Városmajor Street in Budapest. At that time, he met István Beöthy, with whom they studied Buddhism and Oriental art. His style was not mature yet: in 1922 he exhibited abstract artwork at a group exhibition of young artists at Ernst Museum, but his other paintings of the same year reflect the traditions of the Hungarian painting of the turn of the century and the influence of his masters. He went on a European study trip; the first station was in Germany in 1924, where he met with the works of Kandinsky and Klee, and then studied the paintings of Giotto and Piero della Francesca in Italy. He first visited Paris in 1924, then only for three months, then again in the autumn of 1925 for staying. The money that he received from his uncle was gone, and for months he was in extreme poverty, and as advised by László Ney lived on cartoons made from guests at Montmartre cafés. Many Hungarians lived in Paris, in addition to his mother, György Marton, Zsigmond Kolozsvári and Gábor Peterdi helped Szenes artistically. At this time he already had exhibitions, and while he was having a bohemian lifestyle with many affairs, he was also attending the Académie de la Grande Chaumière. Here he met in 1929 the Portuguese artist Maria Helena Vieira da Silva and they married in 1930, his wife became a Hungarian citizen, and remained until 1956. After marriage, he lived a more restrained life.

In 1930, the couple visited the Nagybánya artists' colony. They lived and worked in a dead end called rue des Camelias in Paris, where many artists lived. They met Lajos Tihanyi's friend, Kokoschka and Varèse, but Jacques Lipchitz also visited them. Later they moved to boulevard Saint Jacques where their studio was above a cardboard factory. Through their patron and gallery owner, Jeanne Bucher, they were in close contact with Joan Miró and Max Ernst.

At that time Szenes visited the café gatherings of Les Amis du Monde, a group of young left-wing artists including Étienne Hajdú, Maurice Estève, Édouard Pignon, André Breton, Louis Aragon. Through his wife, he contacted the Stanley William Hayter-led Atelier 17 studio which inspired his surrealist works from the 1930s.

At the outbreak of World War II they left Paris, leaving Jeanne Bucher their studio and pictures. They spent a few months in Lisbon, where Szenes had an independent exhibition, and then went to Brazil in 1940. They lived in Rio de Janeiro for some time, then settled in nearby Santa Teresa. The art community in Rio was less inspirational than in Paris; although they met Dr. Atl and some other painters, they were more involved with poets and writers at this time. He painted nature, portraits of writers, poets and illustrated books. He founded a painting school called Sylvestre, taught amateurs and young Brazilian modernists.

In 1947 they returned to Paris, regained the boulevard Saint Jacques studio and Szenes continued to teach. At that time he started working on perhaps his most significant series of geometric and organic shapes, repetitive motifs called 'Bankett' made of various techniques (watercolor, gouache, oil, pastel and chalk). Meanwhile, he painted portraits of Vieira da Silva, making hundreds of paintings altogether. The French state bought from his paintings for the first time in 1949, followed by several state purchases. From the mid-1950s his expression became cleaner. On his landscapes the vertical-horizontal relationship is of great significance, his color scale has been reduced to a few pale colors. From then on, his wife Vieira da Silva became more and more renowned while his popularity diminished.

In 1979 he donated seven works made between 1942 and 1970 to the Museum of Fine Arts in Budapest and the Janus Pannonius Museum in Pécs. After his death and the end of communism in Hungary, Vieira da Silva established a foundation in 1990 in Lisbon with their names for the promotion of young artists. The museum building in Praça das Amoreiras 58 was previously a silk factory.

He died in Paris at age 87 from a pulmonary edema, in 1985.

== List of works ==
Works in books

Chapters Pierre Guéguen: La chasse au faon rose (ed. Cahiers d'Art, 1938) c. book of Illustrations for Murilo Mendes, Rainer-Maria Rilke, Jorge de Lima, 1944 Fifty gouaches René Char Le Temps épars c. manuscript, 1966 Gravures (ed. F. Mermod), Lausanne, 1968.

His works in public collections

Solomon R. Guggenheim Museum, New York Musée National d'Art Moderne, Paris Musée des Beaux-Arts, Dijon Musée des Beaux-Arts, Rennes Musée des Beaux-Arts, Rouen M. Figueira da Foz (POR) Musée canton des Beaux-Arts, Lausanne Musée Fabre, Montpellier M. Bezalel, Jerusalem Museum of Fine Arts, Budapest Janus Pannonius Museum, Pécs M. Nacional, Rio de Janeiro Kunsthalle, Zurich Center d'Art contemporain, Abbaye de Beaulieu. exhibitions Individual exhibitions

- 1933 - Galerie UP [engraving by Julian Trevelyan], Paris
- 1939, 1949, 1952, 1955, 1974 - Galerie Jeanne Bucher, Paris
- 1941 - Press House, Rio de Janeiro
- 1947 - Quelques français et des peintres, sculpteurs et graveurs hongrois de l'Ecole de Paris, Galerie de Bussy, Paris
- 1957 - Galerie Betty Thommen, Basel
- 1958 - Galerie Pierre, Paris
- 1960, 1965, 1969 - Galerie de Cahiers d'Art, Paris
- 1961 - Galerie du Grand Chene, Lausanne
- 1965 - Galerie Alice Pauli, Lausanne - Galerie 27, Oslo
- 1969, 1974, 1981, 1988 - Galerie Jacob, Paris
- 1968 - Paysages accordés, Galerie Alice Pauli, Lausanne
- 1970 - Galerie Régence, Brussels
- 1971-1973 - Retrospective - Musée des Beaux-Arts d'Orleans - Fundaçao Calouste Gulbekian, Lisbon - Rennes - Lille - Nantes - Rouen
- 1974 - Musée d'Art Moderne de la Ville de Paris, Paris (Retrospective)
- 1975 - Musée Fabre, Montpellier - Galerie Michel Vokaer, Brussels
- 1976 - Dessins d'Arpad Szenes and de Vieira da Silva, Center Georges Pompidou, Paris
- 1977 - Hungarian National Gallery, Budapest - Janus Pannonius Museum, Pécs - G. Information, Tunis
- 1982 - Hommage à Arpad Senes, M. Ingres, Montauban
- 1983-1984 - Musée des Beaux-Arts de Dijon - G. EMI, Lisbon
- 1985 - Fundaçao Calouste Gulbekian, Lisbon
- 1985 - Hommage à Arpad Senes, Galerie Jeanne Bucher and Galerie Jacob, Paris
- 1986 - Nasoni G., Porto - Fundaçao Calouste Gulbekian, Lisbon
- 1987 - Fundaçao Calouste Gulbekian, Lisbon - Bertrand G., Lisbon
- 1989 - Modern Art Museum, Porto
- 1994 - Budapest Historical Museum, [Vieira da Silva]
- 1995 - Hommage à Vieira da Silva et ~, Abbaye de Beaulieu, Ginals (FR)
- 1997 - Fundaçao Árpád Senes-Vieira da Silva, Lisbon (retrospective)
- 1999 - Portraits of [Vieira da Silva], Fine Arts Museum, Budapest
- 2000 - Salle St. Jean, Hôtel de Ville de Paris - Fundaçao Calouste Gulbekian, Lisbon

Most important group exhibitions

- 1931, 1933, 1934, 1936, 1937, 1956 - Salon des Surindépendants, Paris
- 1932 - Salon d'Automne, Salon des Tuileries, Paris
- 1936 - Atelier 17, Leicester Gallery, London - New painting from Europe, East River Gallery, New York
- 1938 - Hungarian Artists in Paris, Tamás Gallery, Budapest - École de Paris, Galerie Jeanne Bucher, Paris
- 1944 - Atelier 17, Modern Art Museum, New York
- 1948 - French, Spanish and Hungarian Artists, National Salon, Budapest
- 1948, 1953, 1960, 1961, 1966, 1967 - Salon de Mai, Paris
- 1952 - Rythme et couleurs, Musée Cantonal, Lausanne - Les peintres d'aujourd'hui in Paris, Kunsthaus, Zurich
- 1953 - Biennale de São Paulo
- 1955 - The Movement of Contemporary Art, Musée Cantonal, Lausanne
- 1957 - French art, Zagreb - Belgrade
- 1959 - from Manet to the present, Warsaw - Hommage à Monet, Galerie Art Vivant, Paris - 80 Maler der Ecole de Paris, 1900-1959 - Vienna - Linz
- 1959, 1960 - Documenta II. and III, Kassel
- 1960 - Hommage à Jeanne Bucher, Galerie Jeanne Bucher - La Peinture française d'aujourd'hui, Museum of Tel Aviv - M. Bezalel, Jerusalem
- 1961 - Stedelijk M., Amsterdam
- 1962 - "French Rysunki XVII-XX S", Warsaw
- 1962, 1968 - Salon des Réalités Nouvelles, Paris
- 1963 - Contemporary French Painting, National Gallery, Salisbury
- 1966 - Dix ans d'art living 1945–1955, Fondation Maeght, St. Paul de Vence (FR)
- 1967 - Dix ans d'art vivant 1955–1965, Fondation Maeght, St. Paul de Vence (FR) - Galerie Jacob, Paris - Les quatre éléments, Galerie Cimaise, Paris
- 1968 - Painting in France 1900-1967 (traveling exhibition), Washington, New York, Chicago, San Francisco, Montreal - L'uso de la peinture [with Bryn, Zack], Galerie La Roue, Paris
- 1969 - Hommage à René Char, Musée de Céret
- 1970 - Hungarians from Paris, Galerie Zunini, Paris - 20th Century Hungarian Artists Abroad, Műcsarnok, Budapest
- 1971 - Hommage à Christian et Yvonne Zervos, Grand Palais, Pari
- 1979 - Spring Exhibition, Hungarian House, Paris - Présence Paris-Budapest, Orangerie des Jardins du Luxembourg
- 1982 - Honor to your homeland. Artists living abroad with Hungarian descent II. exhibition, Műcsarnok.
