= Julie de Cistello =

Portuguese-Brazilian impressionist painter

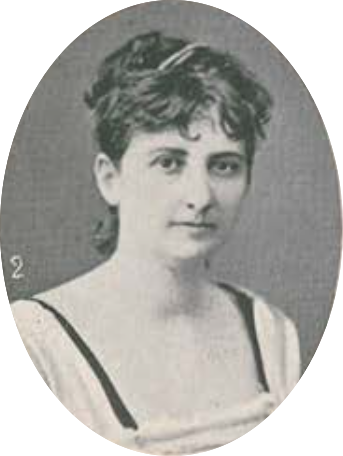
- Born: Julie de la Bourdonnay Cistello; 1853; Rio de Janeiro
- Died: 1932 (aged 78–79)
- Education: Académie Julian
- Notable work: Sous les Pommiers (1912)
- Movement: Impressionist
- Spouse: Manuel Antônio Gonçalves Roque

Signature
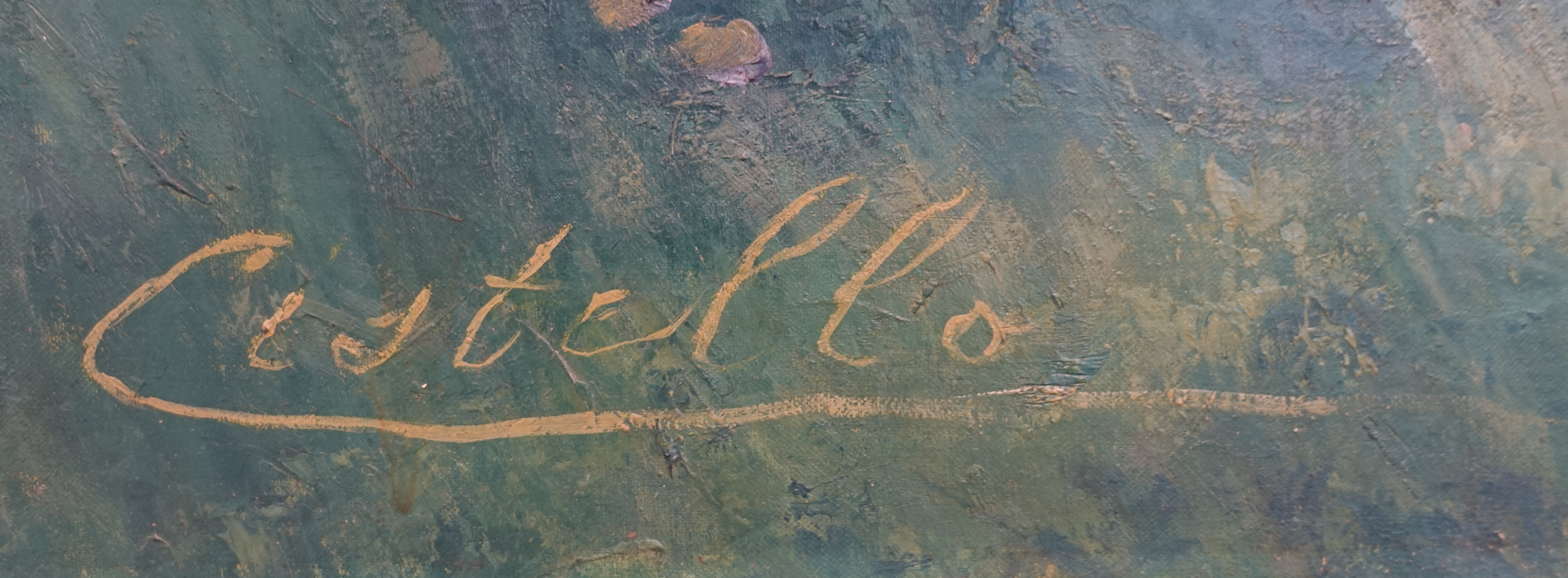

Julie de Cistello, or Julie de la Bourdonnay Cistello, known as Vicomtesse de Sistelo (Rio de Janeiro, 1853–1932) was a Portuguese-Brazilian impressionist painter in the late 19th and early 20th centuries, a pioneer in women's access to art education, and one of the first Portuguese-Brazilian women artists in the annual Parisian Salons. Her name in Portuguese is Júlia Labourdonnay Gonçalves Roque.

== Family origins ==
Born on November 22, 1853, in Rio de Janeiro, she was the daughter of Boaventura Gonçalves Roque (Sistelo, April 22, 1822 - Estoril, June 14, 1894) who went very young and poor to Brazil where he made a fortune as a merchant, and then been a patron of social, artistic and literary initiatives. Her mother, Maria Luisa de Labourdonnay, was from a family of French aristocratic origin exiled to Rio de Janeiro after the French Revolution. From an early age, her mother educated her three daughters in music and the arts, and they were pupils of the French landscape painter Henri Nicolas Vinet and the Portuguese painter José Malhoa. They exhibited at the General Exhibition of Fine Arts in 1879 (at the Imperial College D. Pedro II), where they received honourable mentions. They spoke French, English, Italian and German.

=== Her artist sister: Emília Labourdonnay Gonçalves Roque ===
Julie de Cistello was the first-born daughter. Her sister Isabel was also an artist and died at the age of 32 in 1888 in Rio de Janeiro, two years after having won the Gold Medal of the Artistic and Industrial Exhibition of Petropólis with a landscape painting. Her younger sister, Emília Labourdonnay Gonçalves Roque, become a well-known painter in Portugal with whom Julie exhibited in parallel throughout her career. Emília was married in 1894 to her widowed brother-in-law, and began to sign her artistic work as Countess of Alto Mearim. She died in 1939.

== The Castle of Sistelo and the Julian Academy in Paris ==
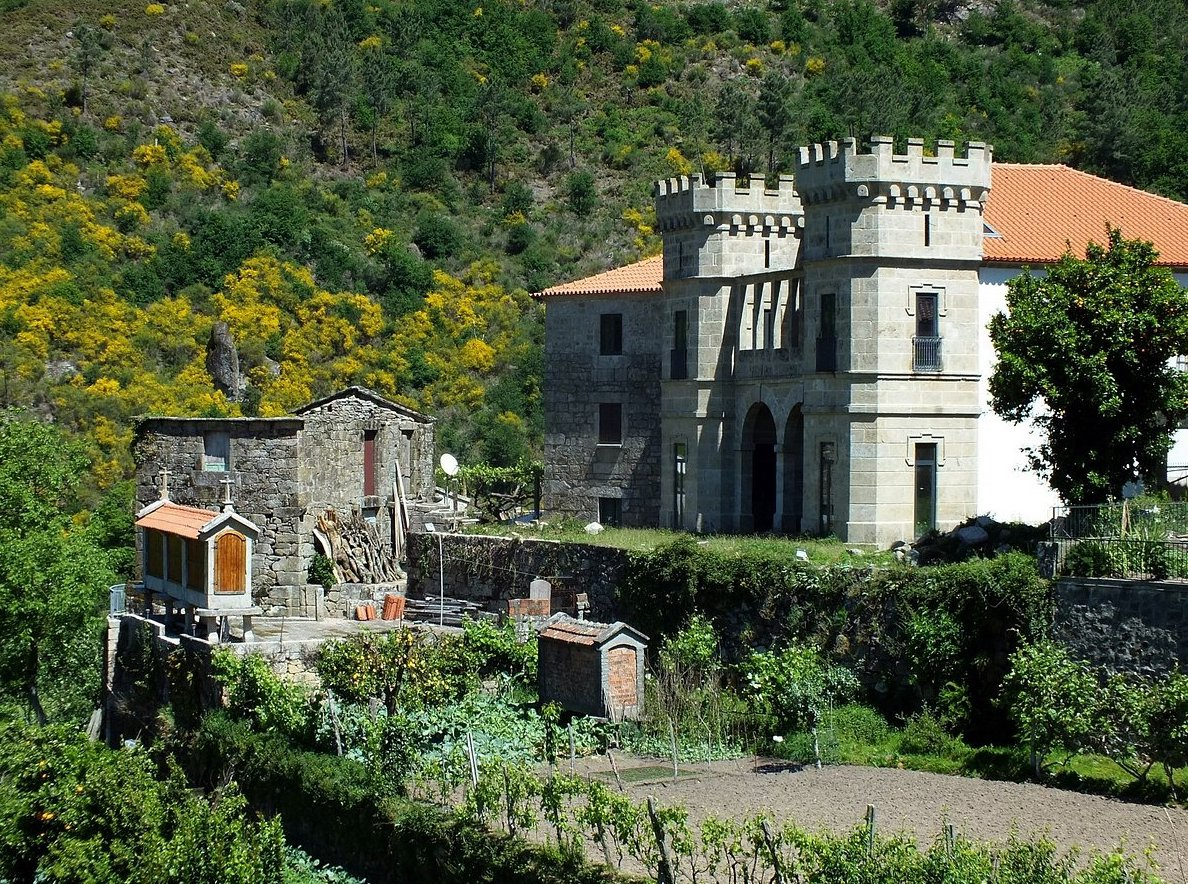
Castle of Sistelo in the village of Sistelo, northern Portugal, part of the Peneda-Gerês National Park.

Julie de Cistello married Manuel Antônio Gonçalves Roque (Sistelo, 14 June 1834 - Rio de Janeiro, 19 October 1886), her father's younger brother, twenty years her senior, in Rio de Janeiro in 1870. He too had emigrated young to follow his brother to Brazil, where he made his fortune as a merchant. Julie probably returned to Portugal in around 1880, the year in which her husband, a renowned patron of social and artistic initiatives in Brazil and Portugal, was appointed 1st Viscount of Sistelo. He was a benefactor, among others, of the Association of Portuguese Architects and Archaeologists and the Gabinete Português de Leitura in Rio de Janeiro.

In Sistelo, his village in northern Portugal in the Peneda-Gerês National Park, he built the Castle of Sistelo, and paid for the village fountain, the public school and the grave where the family is buried. They had no children and Julie was widowed in 1886, at the age of 32. It was precisely from then on that her career would have a great development, having financed herself her artistic studies at the Académie Julian in Paris, where she enrolled in 1892 and again in 1900. The Académie Julian was one of the first schools to accept to integrate women in art education classes, preceding the School of Fine Arts in Paris. Julie de Cistello was a pupil of Gabriel Ferrier, William Bouguereau and Jean-Jacques Rousseau.

== Exhibitions and participation in the Parisian Salons ==
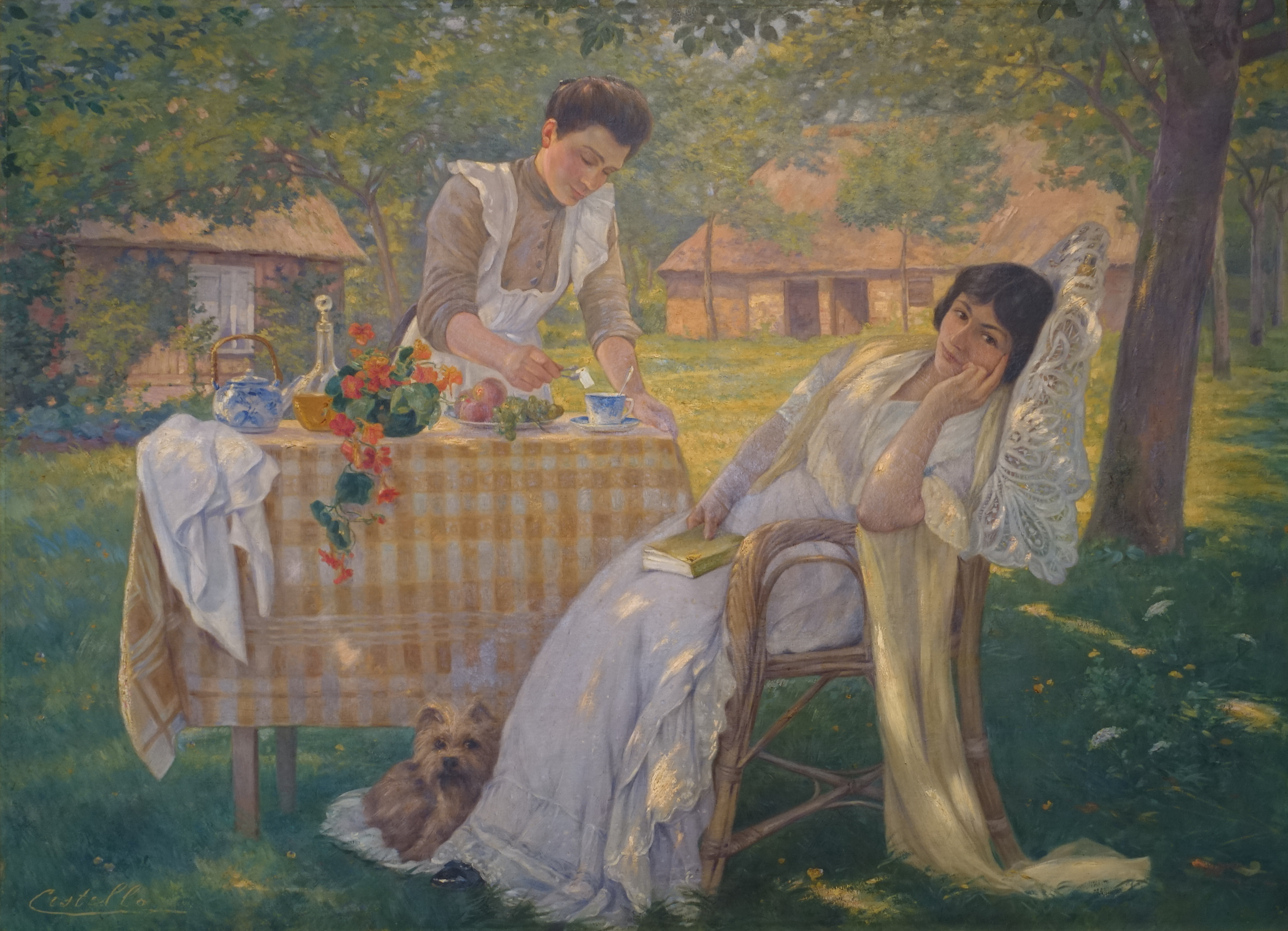
Sous les pommiers (before 1912)

She was one of the first Portuguese-Brazilian women artists to exhibit in the Parisian Salons, in 1897 with "Pietà" and 1898 with "Communiante". In 1900 she exhibited in the Pavilion of Portugal at the Universal Exhibition of Paris, where she lived (with the paintings "La Fin d'une ondine", "Rose de Noël", "Irène" and "L'Anniversaire"). In 1906 at the Salon of the Union of Women Painters and Sculptors in Paris with three landscapes paintings; in 1908 at the Exhibition of the centenary of the opening of the Ports of Brazil (the paintings "Pescador (Matosinhos)", "Première étoile (Leça da Palmeira)", "Castelo do Queijo (Foz do Douro)", "Olaias in flora (Tapada da Ajuda, Lisbon)", "Temps brumeux (Margens do Seine, Paris)", "Coucher du soleil (Margens do Seine, Paris)" and "O rosário"); in 1909 at the Salon of the Société Nationale des Beaux Arts in Paris with the painting "La Réponse"; in 1910 at the Salon of the Société Nationale des Beaux Arts de Paris with "La Grand-mère" and at the Salon of the Union of Women Painters and Sculptors in Paris (with "Fleurs des Champs", "Solitude", "Coucher du soleil", "Les Capucines" and "Prêt a sortir"). In 1912, she exhibited perhaps her best known painting, " Sous les Pommiers " (French: Under the apple trees) at the Salon of the Société Nationale des Beaux Arts in Paris, and is owned by the Musée des Beaux-Arts in Nice. In 1913 she again exhibited his painting "Jeune fille, portrait" at the same Salon and joined the "Cercle des Artistes Brésiliens" in Paris. She exhibited at the Salon until 1924.

The French newspaper Le Figaro regularly announced her presence at mundane events in Paris between January 1901 and June 1914, a month before the outbreak of the First World War. She died in 1932 at the age of 69.

== Art work ==
According to Portuguese art historian Maria da Luz Quintão de Jesus Pinheiro, the painting "Sous les Pommiers" (1912) by Julie de Cistello uses the garden as a place of introspection, enhancing a female character and exacerbating the melancholy and meditative feeling. The character directly addresses the observer through her gaze, and the context highlights the status of a privileged woman, through the maid who prepares her tea. It is also a testimony to the importance given by privileged women to education, depicting female characters reading, or in the case of "La Réponse" (1909) to the importance of writing in women's lives. In this case to epistolary writing, representing a woman who has put down her parasol and her hat, sitting down in front of a small desk full of notebooks, together with the attempts to reply that were rejected by the character and are laid out on the floor, referring the observer to the psychological state of the model.
