= Henri Nicolas Vinet =

French painter (1817–1876)

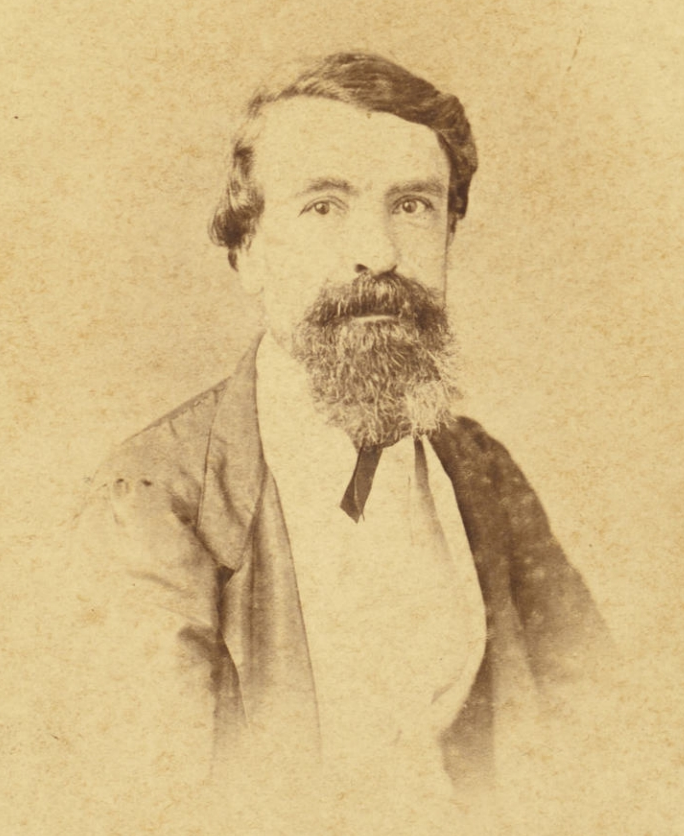
- Born: 9 September 1817; Paris, Kingdom of France
- Died: 15 March 1876 (aged 58); Niterói, Empire of Brazil
- Education: École des Beaux-Arts
- Known for: Painting
- Movement: Barbizon School

Henri Nicolas Vinet (9 September 1817 – 15 March 1876) was a French painter, (Note: As reports the Jornal do Comércio of March 17 of that year.) designer and teacher who moved to Brazil in 1856, where he remained for the rest of his life. Not much is known about him until the early 1840s.

== Biography ==
Henri Nicolas Vinet was born in Paris on 9 September 1817 to Henri and Madeleine Angelique Nicolas Vinet, who lived at 8 the Rue du Mont-Parnasse. In 1841 he took part in the Salon de Paris, where his painting Vue de la Foret de Fontainebleau par une matinee d'octobre was presented.

He studied at the École des Beaux-Arts in Paris. He was a friend and disciple of Jean-Baptiste-Camille Corot, having participated of the Barbizon school where many famous landscape artists, who had the habit of painting outdoors, were educated. In his last appearance, the presented work had been painted in Brazil.

In 1841 he took part in the Salon de Paris, also in 1843 and 1845. In this period he was working near Paris and restricted his trips to the departments of Seine-et-Oise and Seine-et-Marne. In 1848, he took four landscapes to the Salon; the study Vue prize aux environs d'Enghien - Vallée de Montmorency was painted in 1843. This painting, though mutilated, is currently located in Brazil and represents the typical quality of the artist's work fifteen years before leaving France.

Vinet moved to the outskirts of Le Havre before 1849, persistently devoting himself to the study of the natural. The reason for his transfer to the tropics and why he chose the city of Rio de Janeiro for residence is not known. But as a newcomer, already in his 39 years old, he opened his studio on Rua da Quitanda where he ministered classes in drawing and painting. In 1872 he moved to Niterói, where he died on 15 March 1876.

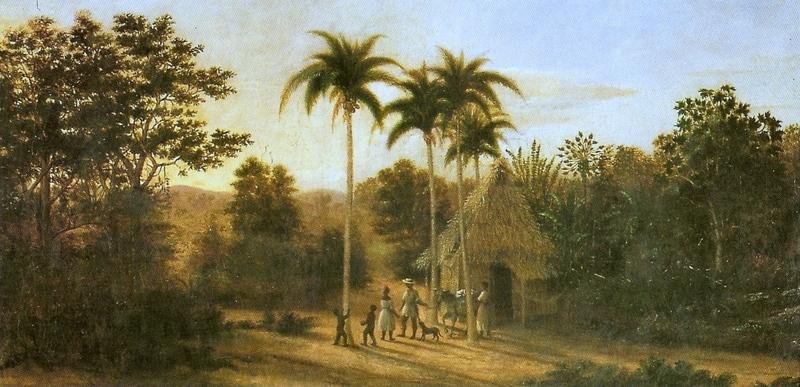
Landscape with figures and a straw-thatched hut.

== Bibliography ==
- Braga, Teodoro. Artistas pintores no Brasil. São Paulo: São Paulo Editora, 1942.
- Mello Jr. Donato et allii. 150 anos de pintura no Brasil. Rio de Janeiro: Colorama, 1989.
