= Más Notícias =

1895 painting by Rodolfo Amoedo

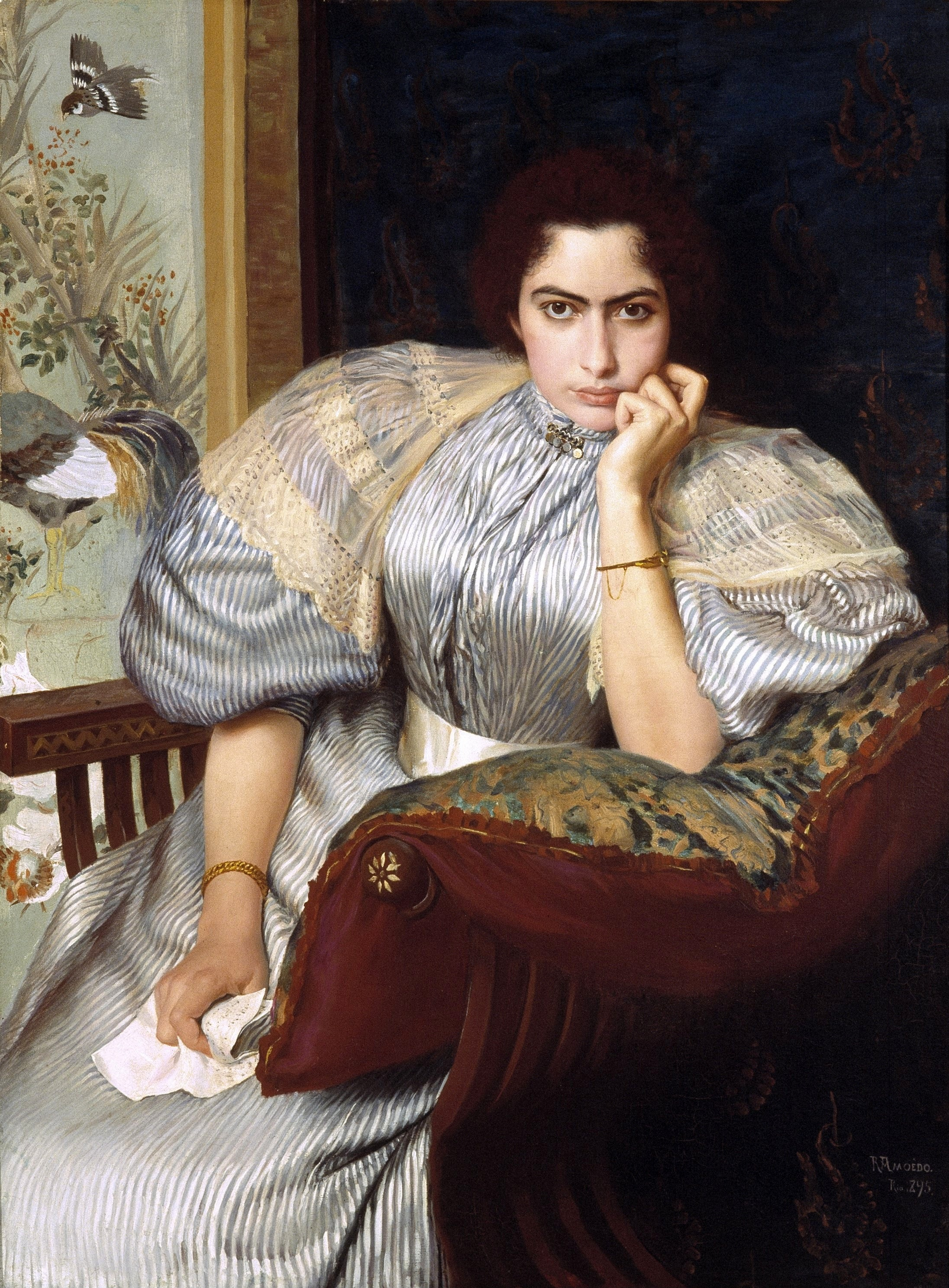
- Artist: Rodolfo Amoedo
- Year: 1895
- Medium: Oil on canvas
- Dimensions: 100 cm × 74 cm (39 in × 29 in)
- Location: National Museum of Fine Arts, Rio de Janeiro

Más Notícias (Brazilian Portuguese pronunciation: [ˈmaz noˈt͡ʃisiɐs]; English: "Bad News") is an oil painting created by the Brazilian artist Rodolfo Amoedo in 1895. Housed at the National Museum of Fine Arts in Rio de Janeiro, it depicts a woman seated in an armchair, gazing forward and meeting the viewer's eyes. The painting is characterized by its blend of realistic painting techniques and emerging movements in Brazil, such as symbolism and modernism; this synthesis of diverse influences has led this work to be recognized within the history of Brazilian art.

Presented at the Second General Exhibition of the National School of Fine Arts (Escola Nacional de Belas Artes; ENBA), Amoedo's work was regarded as diverging from the canons of more conventional and academic painting. It was praised by critics for introducing new artistic currents to Brazil, which had already gained recognition in Europe, where the artist had spent time years before the painting's debut. The work was also noted for its exploration of feminine psychology through art.

Amoedo's painting became an expression of broader societal shifts. Characteristics of the work, such as its size and subject matter, were linked to the rise of the bourgeoisie and changing relationships between art and domestic life.

== Background ==
Rodolfo Amoedo painted Más Notícias during a period of social transformations, which he sought to incorporate into his work. In the late 19th century, the industrial bourgeoisie consolidated as the ruling class, and positivism emerged as a movement oriented toward scientific progress. In Brazil, alongside the growth of the coffee economy (particularly in São Paulo), there was increasing social and political pressure for republicanism and the abolition of slavery. The societal changes of the second half of the 19th century were linked to shifts in the artistic environment, influencing Brazilian art broadly and Amoedo specifically. These included greater market demand for smaller-scale works for domestic decoration and the expansion of mass communication, with space for art criticism. Amoedo's work was mentioned in many press articles covering the Second General Exhibition of the National School of Fine Arts (Escola Nacional de Belas Artes; ENBA), where the painting debuted. By then, he was an established artist and vice-director of the school, attracting media attention. Alongside Más Notícias, he presented three other works at the exhibition on 31 August 1895: Passeio Matinal, Refeição Matinal, and Melancolia—all poorly received at the time and now lost. Más Notícias was acquired by the school that same year.

Another artistic shift influencing Amoedo was the rise of realism, emphasizing depictions of contemporary life. Unlike history painting or academic art, realist works focused on anonymous figures—bourgeois and workers in urban or rural settings—capturing everyday moments, such as the aftermath of reading a letter, as in Más Notícias. The consolidation of realism in Brazil occurred amid institutional crisis in the arts, as the Imperial Academy of Fine Arts (AIBA), Brazil's art school, resisted new techniques and faced criticism from artists over restricted artistic freedom. This discontent led to the founding of ENBA in 1890, where Amoedo was actively involved.

Depictions of women were successful in the global art market, particularly in Paris, where Amoedo studied from 1879 to 1887 and revisited in the early 1890s. Artists such as Alexandre Cabanel, Paul Baudry, and John Singer Sargent influenced his work. Similarities between their portraits and Más Notícias include domestic settings, intimate compositions, the subject's confrontational gaze, and detailed clothing. In Brazil, artists such as Belmiro de Almeida (e.g., Amuada, 1906; A Má Notícia, 1897) and Amoedo's student Maria Pardos (e.g., Má Notícia, undated) also produced works with similar themes. Despite these examples, depictions of women in social and domestic settings remained rare in 19th-century Brazilian painting, contrasting their prevalence in literature.

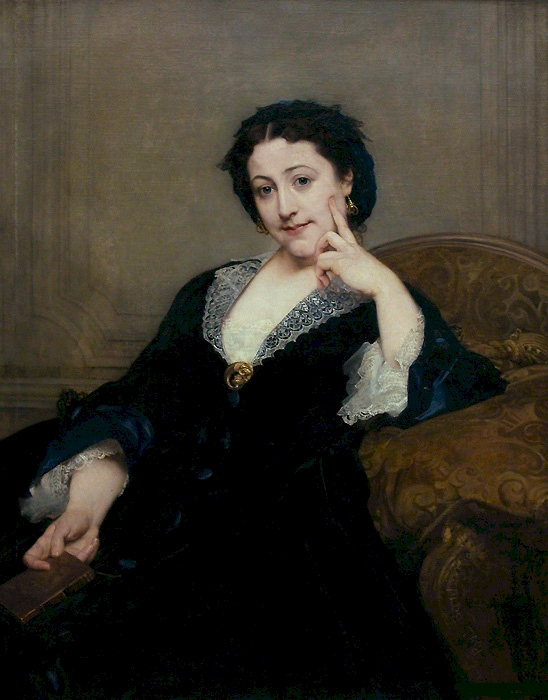
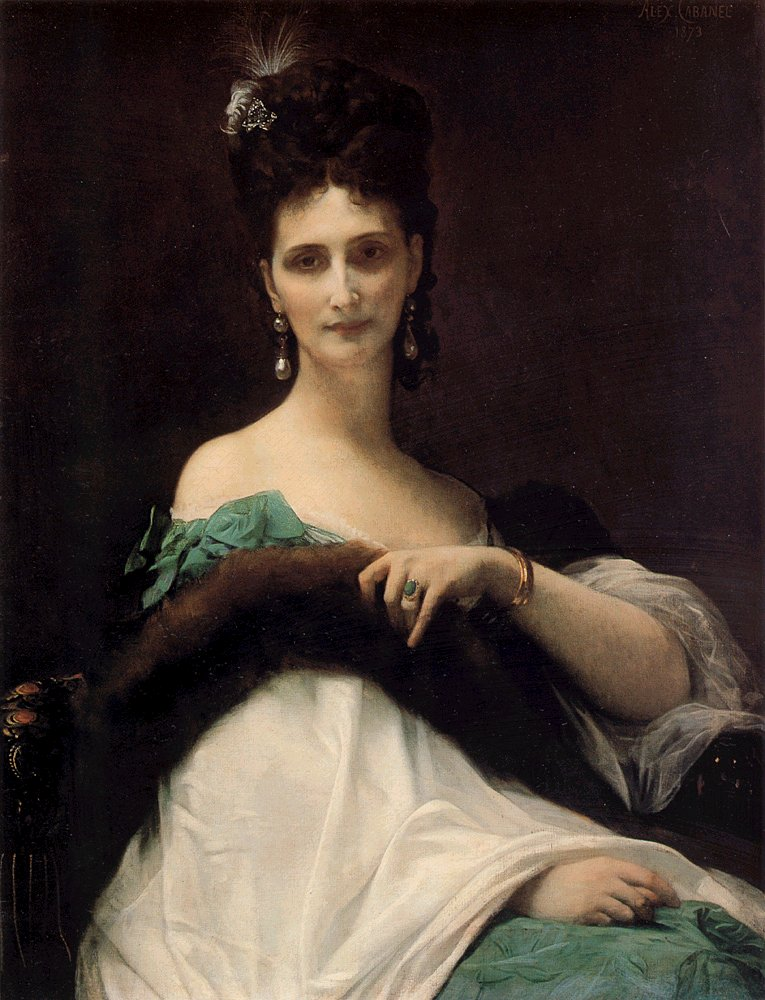
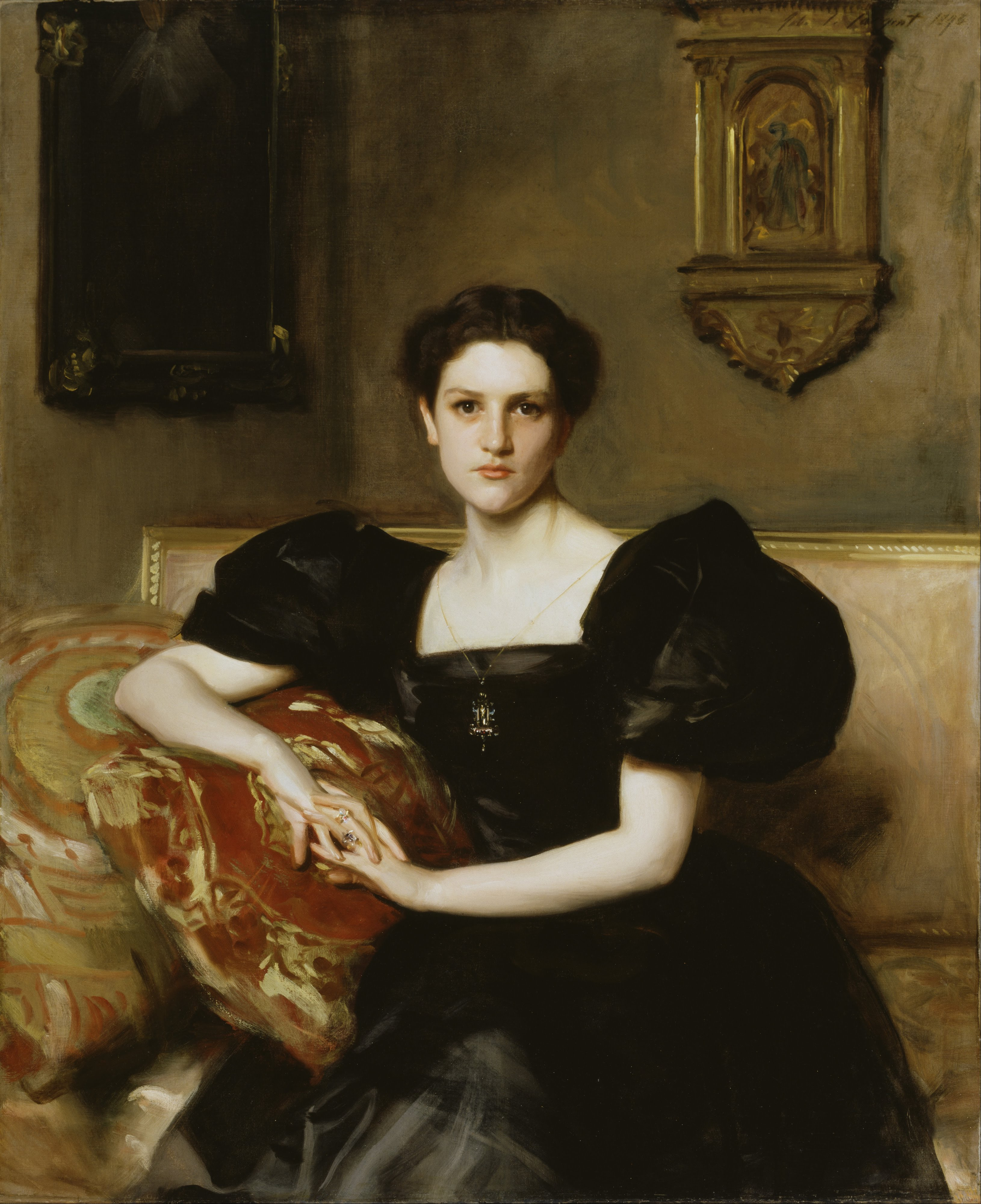
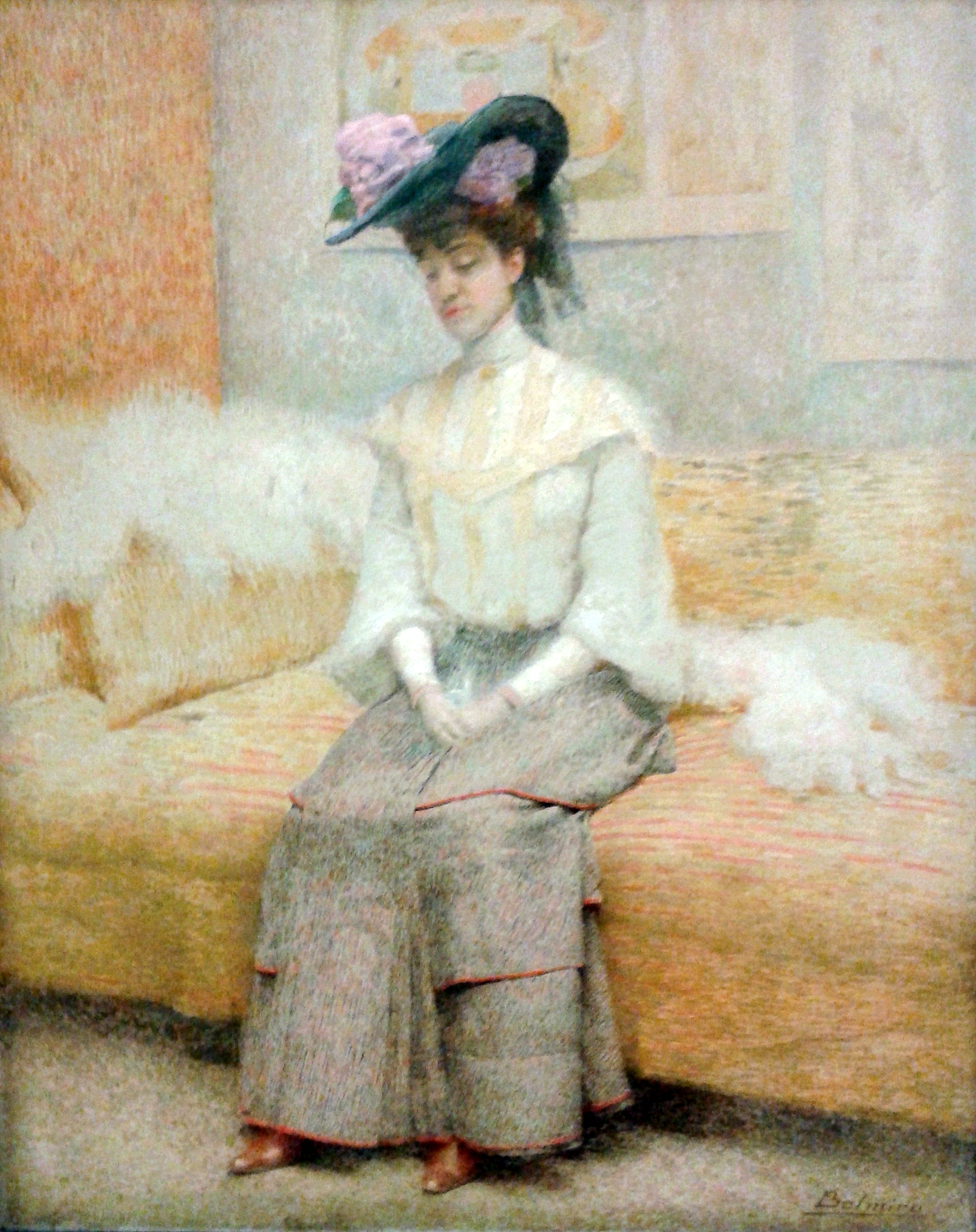
From left to right: Madeleine Brohan (1860) by Paul Baudry, La Comtesse de Keller (1873) by Alexandre Cabanel, Elizabeth Winthrop Chanler (1893) by John Singer Sargent, and Amuada (1906) by Belmiro de Almeida. These works share compositional similarities with Más Notícias.

== Composition ==
Más Notícias is a painting by Rodolfo Amoedo created using oil paint in 1895 in Rio de Janeiro. It measures 100 centimeters (39 inches) in height and 74 centimeters (29 inches) in width. At the center of the composition is a woman seated in an X-chair; she wears a blue-and-white striped dress with puffed sleeves, covering her entire body except for her head and forearms. Over the dress is a lace shawl, which covers but reveals her shoulders. The attire suggests she belongs to an affluent social class, interpreted as the painter's strategy to obscure the female body within elegant social conventions. The dress is intricately detailed with varied textures. The woman wears delicate golden bracelets on her wrists; she has no wedding ring. It has been suggested that the subject is the artist's sister-in-law, Maria de Morais.

The setting is domestic and refined. The woman rests her left elbow on a cushion, notable for its sheen. Behind her, to her right, is part of a panel depicting a pastoral scene with birds and plants, partially obscured by the chair. The techniques evoke an Orientalist style, as does the floral cushion covering the left side of the chair. The background on the left side of the figure is dark, creating a sense of confinement and proximity to the viewer. Pictorial elements are fragmented, as no object—or even the woman herself—is fully visible, emphasizing the central focus: her gaze. The dark background symbolically frames her head, heightening the painting's expressiveness.

The subject appears to confront the observer. Her demeanor has been described as "defiant", "enigmatic", "angry", "troubled", "resentful", and "anguished". In her right hand, she clutches a crumpled paper resembling a letter. The rigid chair, on which she sits askew, accentuates the scene's tension and discomfort. Her expression and the crumpled paper imply that the letter's contents deliver the "bad news" referenced in the painting's title. The artist's signature is in the lower right corner, accompanied by the notation "Rio, 1895".

== Analysis ==
Saudades (1899) by Almeida Júnior, like Más Notícias, combines domestic realism with subjective narrative aligned with symbolism.

While associated with a common representational style at the turn of the 19th to the 20th century, Más Notícias stands out for its exploration of femininity. The woman portrayed by Amoedo is both introspective and defiant, and her central placement on the canvas has been interpreted as expressing the growing social visibility of women at the time.

While elements of Más Notícias align it with realism, its depiction of feminine psychology—particularly the emotional ambiguity of the central figure—links it to the symbolist movement. Symbolism, in reaction to the scientific and bourgeois societal progress of the era, emphasized subjective exploration. Thus, Amoedo not only portrays a bourgeois interior or daily scene, but also a suspended, immersive narrative whose meaning is pieced together through fragments like the gaze, the crumpled letter, and the painting's title. Amoedo blended realist and symbolist elements in other works, such as Figura Feminina de Vermelho à Janela (undated), Mulher (undated), Retrato de Adelaide Amoedo aos Vinte Anos (1892), and Recordação. This fusion of realism and symbolism also marked the works of Amoedo's contemporaries, Eliseu Visconti and Almeida Júnior.

The narrative of Más Notícias extends beyond the association between the title and the painting, creating an enigma that prompts viewers to question the letter's contents and the woman's reaction. The ambiguity between domestic realism, feminine introspection, and situational suspense has been interpreted as a strategy to engage public interest. The climax in Amoedo's work is heightened by the flatness and confined composition of the scene, which draws the viewer closer to the woman while only revealing fragments of objects and the subject herself. This stylistic approach was not uncommon in the late 19th century, as seen in Édouard Manet's Portrait of Émile Zola (1868).

Amoedo's chromatic strategy reflects the artistic synchronicity of various movements in Brazil at the time. The palette features dark areas (e.g., the background and parts of the armchair) that contrast with vivid, luminous tones highlighting the central figure and decorative elements, rendered in precise detail. These intense colors amplify the scene's expressiveness. According to Gonzaga Duque, an art historian who analyzed the work a decade after its release, (Note: References to 19th- and early 20th-century journalistic critiques of Amoedo's work are drawn from the "Annexes" section of Sonia Gomes Pereira's Más Notícias, de Rodolfo Amoedo. Orthographic updates from Pereira's compilation have been retained, and original sources are cited where possible.) Más Notícias is "sincere, powerful, and commanding", a "testament to the master's exceptional skill, his vigorous brushwork, masterful draftsmanship, pristine colors, and the expressive force of his art". Duque described the painting's scene:

This beautiful woman, adorned in elegant attire and with eyes—dark as night, glistening with tears—is a snapshot of the feminine soul, a marvelous instant of a heart wounded by the crumpled letter clutched in her delicate hands, whether of a graceful lady or a thwarted goddess.

— Gonzaga Duque

== Reception and legacy ==
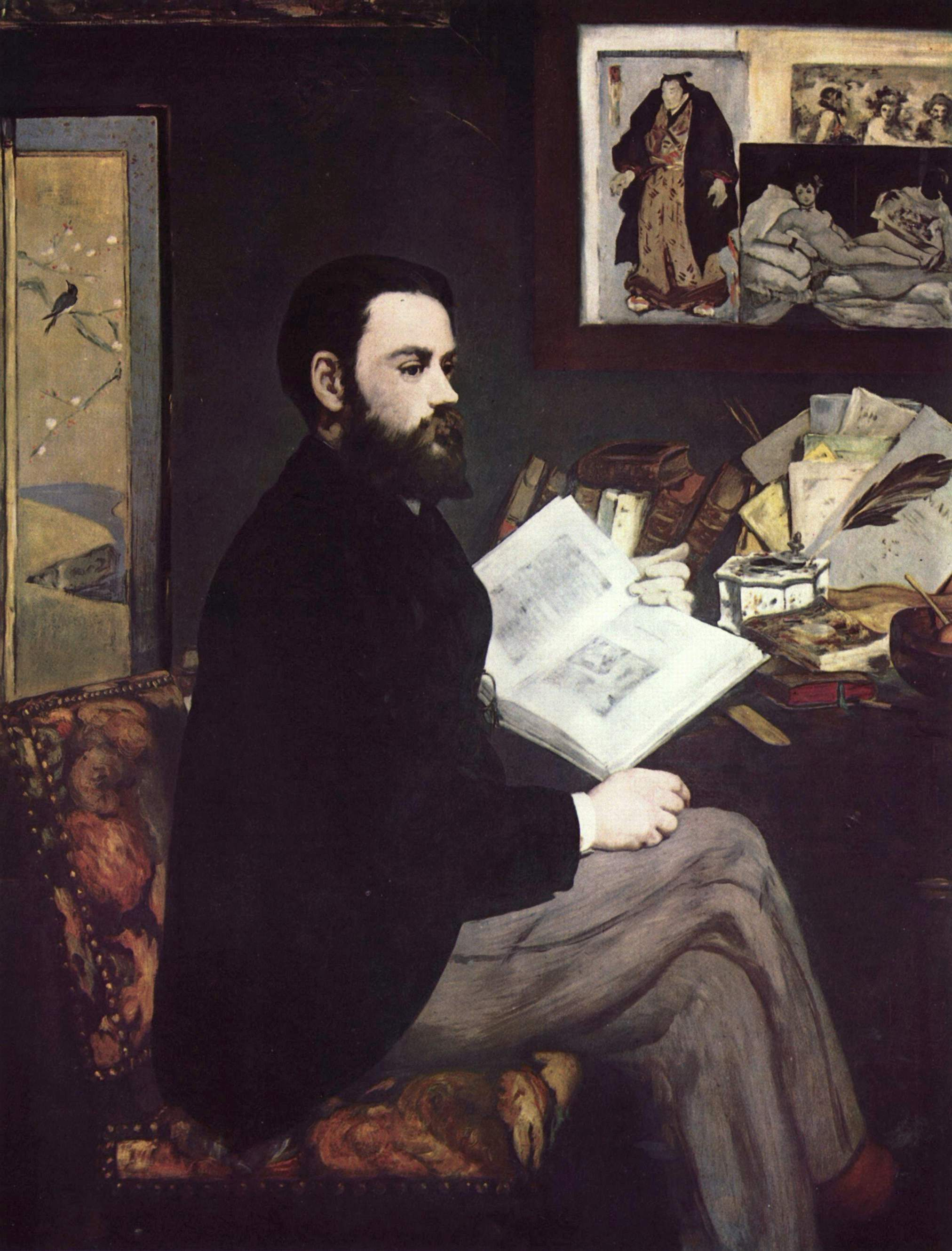
Portrait of Émile Zola (1868) by Édouard Manet, featuring a composition marked by flatness and spatial restraint, similar to Más Notícias.

Contemporary art critics generally praised the painting. One reviewer of Gazeta de Notícias noted that Más Notícias is "drawn and painted by a master's hand", with "the smallest details revealing an artist in full command of his craft". Cidade do Rio critic remarked on the painting's impact: "the expression in the eyes of that young figure—so human and so beautiful—immediately dazzles, compelling the observer to linger in detailed examination". It was received favorably in Jornal do Commercio newspaper, whose reviewer called it "the finest work the illustrious artist has exhibited this year", praising it as "more akin to a portrait than a genre painting", with "exquisitely rendered cushions and dress", though noting the central figure's head appeared "somewhat rigid".

Furthermore, Más Notícias was contrasted with the other works presented by Amoedo at the exhibition. Passeio Matinal and Raio de Sol, also exhibited by Amoedo, were criticized by Gazeta de Notícias for their "harsh tones [that] assault the eye", while Refeição Matinal was deemed by Jornal do Brasil critic Cosme de Moraes "flawed in its hand anatomy, artificially shaded cheeks, and harsh outlines". In contrast, as Moraes wrote, Más Notícias stood out from that "list of disasters":

It is a beautiful woman who crumples the recently read letter. One might say it is a handkerchief and not a letter; however, the admirably depicted fabric of the dress, the striking cushion, and the expression of deep sorrow exuding from her countenance certainly make up for any other imperfection. This shows that when he manages to detach himself from his fixed idea and truly wants to see what is before him, as in the case of this patiently executed portrait, Mr. Amoedo ceases to be the degenerate colorist, the orgiastic wielder of the palette, and the heartless instigator of enraged colors.

— Cosme de Moraes

Later, Más Notícias was recognized for its role in the modernization of Brazilian art. In his critique, Gonzaga Duque from Kósmos lauded the work and its creator, emphasizing Amoedo's defiance of academic conventions: "The evolution of his spirit [...] led him to an art finally *expressive* and less materialistic, exuding a worldly refinement of existence [...] an elegant epicureanism [...] profoundly shaken by ancestral emotional crises". Amoedo's independent expression of artistic subjectivity and creative freedom positioned Más Notícias as a versatile precursor to Brazilian modernism. Its role in a transitional artistic context cemented it as a landmark in Brazilian art history. Frederico Barata dissented, arguing that Amoedo's post-France works, including Más Notícias, paled compared to his earlier output, reflecting a "precocious apogee".

== See also ==
- Brazilian painting

== Bibliography ==
- Anon.[a] (2 September 1895). "Escola Nacional de Belas Artes" [National School of Fine Arts]. Cidade do Rio (in Brazilian Portuguese). No. 203.
- Anon.[b] (1 September 1895). "Exposição de Belas Artes" [Fine Arts Exhibition]. Gazeta de Notícias (in Brazilian Portuguese). No. 243.
- Anon.[c] (9 September 1895). "Notas sobre Arte" [Notes on Art]. Jornal do Commercio (in Brazilian Portuguese). No. 251.
- Capichoni, Amanda Tostes (2013). Más Notícias: uma pintura de gênero de Rodolfo Amoêdo em meio às mudanças do final do século XIX [Más Notícias: A genre painting by Rodolfo Amoêdo amid the changes of the late 19th century] (PDF). Anais da XXX Semana de História da Universidade Federal de Juiz de Fora "As Faces de Clio e os Desafios da História" (Thesis) (in Brazilian Portuguese). ISSN 2317-0468. Archived (PDF) from the original on 1 December 2017.
- Cardoso, Rafael (2008). A arte brasileira em 25 quadros: 1790-1930 [Brazilian art in 25 paintings: 1790–1930] (in Brazilian Portuguese). Rio de Janeiro: Record. ISBN 978-65-5785-118-0.
- Duque, Gonzaga (1905). "Rodolpho Amoêdo: o mestre, deveríamos acrescentar" [Rodolfo Amoedo: the master, we should add]. Kósmos (in Brazilian Portuguese). No. 1.
- Malta, Marize (2006). "A iconografia dos objetos decorativos na pintura acadêmica" [The iconography of decorative objects in academic painting]. XII Encontro Regional de História ANPUH: Usos do Passado.
- Malta, Marize (2021). "A Bela Adormecida. Móveis de repouso para mulheres em fins do Século XIX No Brasil" [The Sleeping Beauty: Rest furniture for women in late 19th-century Brazil] (PDF). Res Mobilis: Revista internacional de investigación en mobiliario y objetos decorativos. 10.
- Migliaccio, Luciano (2007). "Rodolfo Amoedo. O mestre, deveríamos acrescentar" [Rodolfo Amoedo. The master, we should add]. 19&20 (in Brazilian Portuguese). 2. ISSN 1981-030X.
- Moraes, Cosme de (20 September 1895). "O Salão de 1895" [The 1895 Salon]. Jornal do Brasil. No. 263.
- Nicolich, Natália dos Santos (2019). "Más Notícias: Rodolpho Amoedo e a pintura intimista no final do século XIX" [Más Notícias: Rodolfo Amoedo and Intimist Painting in the Late 19th Century]. 19&20 (in Brazilian Portuguese). 1: np. doi:10.52913/19e20.XIV1.06. ISSN 1981-030X.
- Pereira, Sonia Gomes (2010). "A sincronia entre valores tradicionais e modernos na Academia Imperial de Belas Artes: os envios de Rodolfo Amoedo" [The synchrony between traditional and modern values at the Imperial Academy of Fine Arts: The Submissions of Rodolfo Amoedo]. Revista ArtCultura (in Brazilian Portuguese). 12. doi:10.19177/rcc.v3e2200822-24. ISSN 2178-3845.
- Pereira, Sonia Gomes (2023). Más Notícias, de Rodolfo Amoedo [Más Notícias, by Rodolfo Amoedo] (in Brazilian Portuguese). São Paulo: Editora da Universidade de São Paulo. ISBN 978-85-01-07173-6.
- Santos, Antonio Carlos (2008). "Fotografia e pintura, a questão do realismo no século XIX" [Photography and painting, the question of realism in the 19th century]. Crítica Cultural (in Brazilian Portuguese). 3 (2): 22. doi:10.19177/rcc.v3e2200822-24. ISSN 1980-6493.
- Silva, Maria do Carmo Couto da (2012). "A aquisição de obras para a galeria da Escola Nacional de Belas Artes do Rio de Janeiro" [The acquisition of works for the gallery of the National School of Fine Arts in Rio de Janeiro] (PDF). VIII EHA - Encontro de História da Arte (in Brazilian Portuguese): 432–438. doi:10.20396/eha.8.2012.4236.
- Vieira, Samuel Mendes (2012). "Porta adentro: Cenas de intimidade na pintura de Belmiro de Almeida" [Behind closed doors: Scenes of intimacy in the paintings of Belmiro de Almeida] (PDF). VIII EHA - Encontro de História da Arte (in Brazilian Portuguese): 630–640. doi:10.20396/eha.8.2012.4353.
