= A Má Notícia =

1897 painting by Belmiro de Almeida

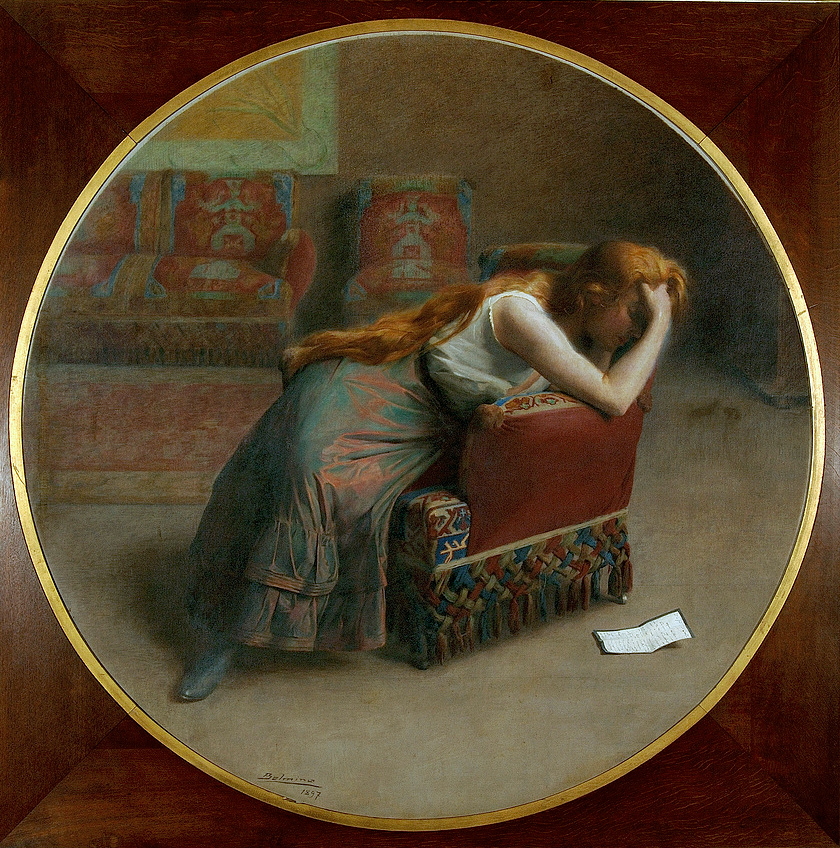
- Artist: Belmiro de Almeida
- Year: 1897
- Medium: Oil on panel
- Dimensions: 168 cm × 168 cm (66 in × 66 in)
- Location: Museu Mineiro, Belo Horizonte

A Má Notícia (Brazilian Portuguese pronunciation: [a ˈma noˈtʃisjɐ]; English: "The Bad News") is an 1897 painting by Brazilian artist Belmiro de Almeida. The work depicts a young woman seated on a fauteuil, leaning forward with a discarded letter on the floor, presumably bearing the "bad news".

== History ==
Painted in Paris, France, it was first exhibited in Ouro Preto, Minas Gerais at the city's Arts and Crafts Lyceum (then the capital of Minas Gerais). Acquired by the state government in October 1897 for 10,000 réis, it was moved to Belo Horizonte after the capital's relocation that year, displayed at the Palácio da Liberdade.

It is reported that the artist had submitted a request for the government to acquire the painting, and when the purchase was carried out in October 1897 for the sum of ten thousand réis, using part of the funds allocated for the relocation of the capital, he donated the painting Aurora do 15 de Novembro—whose government purchase had previously fallen through. (Note: In September 1897, Almeida published an article titled Pela arte em Minas ("For Art in Minas") in the newspaper Minas Geraes, advocating for arts funding while offering his works.) Later, upon returning again from Paris in 1899, he attempted the same strategy to sell the canvas Os Descobridores, intended for the commemorations of the four hundredth anniversary of the Discovery of Brazil, but was unsuccessful.

== Analysis ==
In the report by Samuel Mendes Vieira, "this painting, which lays bare the domestic and human interior, gained prominence in the final decades of the 19th century, responding to a bourgeois audience eager for smaller, decorative canvases with light themes and scenes close to lived reality". The author notes that through his works, the artist reveals the "psychological and domestic dimension" of Brazilian life, a path also taken by several other artists.

The work follows the sentimental themes found in the artist's earlier paintings, such as Arrufos—painted a decade prior—in which a young woman is shown weeping after throwing a rose to the ground, and Amuada, depicting a lady expressing sadness while similarly leaning on a fauteuil, as in A Má Notícia. Several paintings from the period portray the female figure in intimate moments, emphasizing psychological aspects, as seen in Rodolfo Amoedo's Más Notícias and Recordação, Almeida Júnior's Saudade, or Jean Béraud's Après la faute.

== Reception and impact ==
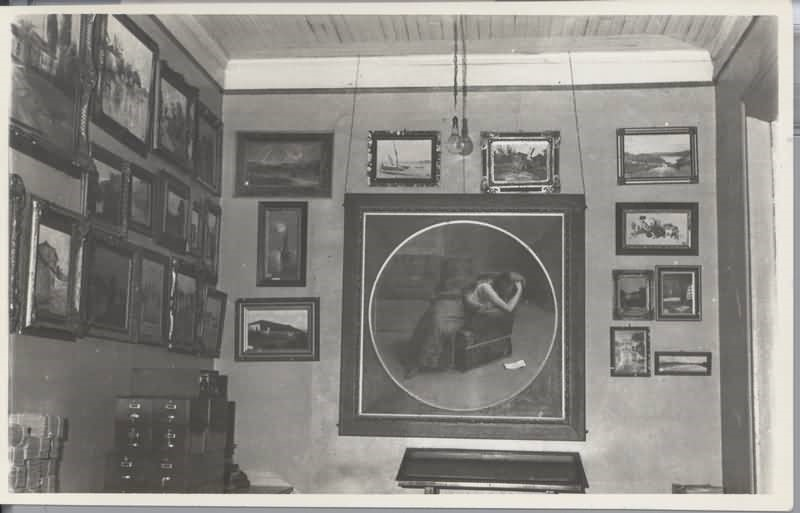
The painting at the Arquivo Público Mineiro.

As the capital of Minas Gerais was moved in 1897, shortly after the painting's initial exhibition, a popular interpretation emerged that the "bad news" referenced in the title was precisely the transfer of the political and administrative center from Ouro Preto to Belo Horizonte.

In the new capital, the painting eventually became the subject of superstition, being blamed for difficulties faced by governors in the early 20th century and considered a bearer of bad omens—which led to its rejection and repeated transfers between various government departments until it was finally placed in the state public archives and, from there, to the Museu Mineiro, where it remains on display. In May 2013, a short film inspired by the painting premiered at the Museu Mineiro's anniversary, directed by Elza Cataldo and starring Fernanda Vianna of Grupo Galpão.

== Bibliography ==
- Conduru, Guilherme Frazão (2022). "Os descobridores (1899), de Belmiro de Almeida: uma reflexão sobre as origens e o destino do Brasil". 19&20. XVII (1–2). Rio de Janeiro. doi:10.52913/19e20.xvii12.02. Archived from the original on 2023-03-23.
- Vieira, Samuel Mendes (2012). "Porta adentro: Cenas de intimidade na pintura de Belmiro de Almeida" (PDF). State University of Campinas. Archived (PDF) from the original on 2021-10-17.
