= Arsênio da Silva =

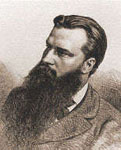
- Born: 20 April 1833; Recife
- Died: 11 February 1883 (aged 49); Salvador

Arsênio Cintra da Silva (1833 – 1883) was a Brazilian painter and pioneering photographer.

== Biography ==
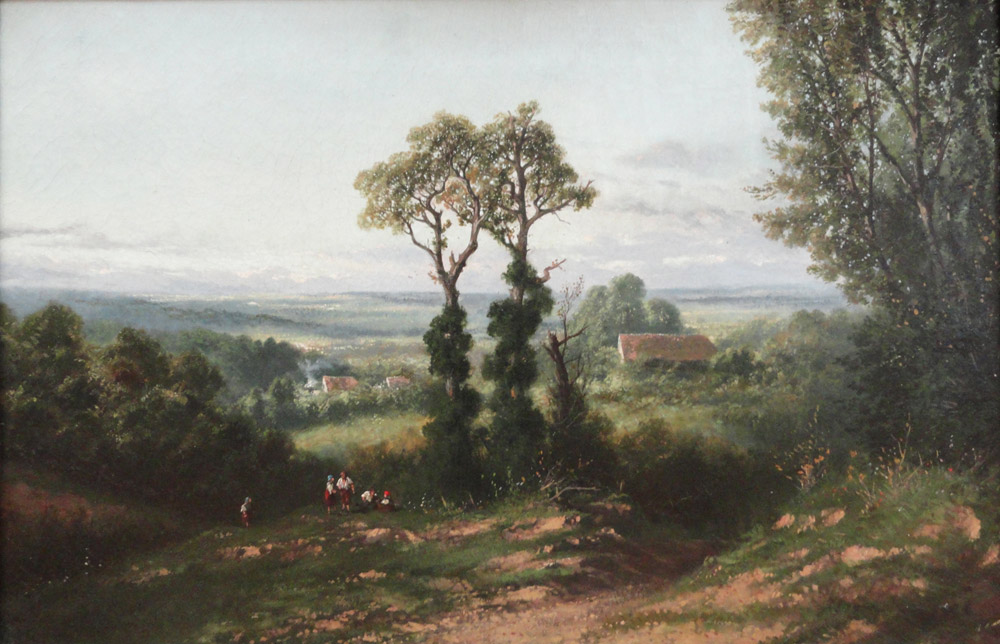
The Environs of Paris

He began his art lessons in Recife, after which he continued his studies in Rome, where he stayed for three years. In 1854, his father died, and he was forced to return home. Two years later, his mother died. After settling his family's affairs, probably in 1858, he returned to Europe and settled in Paris, where he was introduced to the gouache painting technique and exposed to Orientalist art. He lived in Paris until 1860.

Upon returning to Brazil, he chose to live in Rio de Janeiro and became one of the first Brazilian artists to work in gouache. He also became a popular portraitist and took some students, notably Joaquim José Insley Pacheco, who became a lifelong friend. From 1861 to 1879, he participated in the exhibitions of the Imperial Academy of Fine Arts.

In addition to his art, he was one of the first journalistic photographers in Brazil, for he documented the wedding of Princess Isabel and Gaston, Count of Eu in 1864. Many of his photographs were acquired by Emperor Pedro II, an early enthusiast for photography. They are now part of the Thereza Christina Maria Collection at the National Library of Brazil.

Despite the quality of his work and his innovative methods, he eventually found himself ostracized from the Brazilian artistic community. According to some respected critics, such as Gonzaga Duque, this was due to the envy aroused among a number of artists who resented his flaunting of European culture. Whatever the cause, he became increasingly isolated. After his death, several sympathetic artists, including the Italian-born Angelo Agostini, attempted to rehabilitate his reputation.
