= Fernanda Vianna =

Brazilian actor

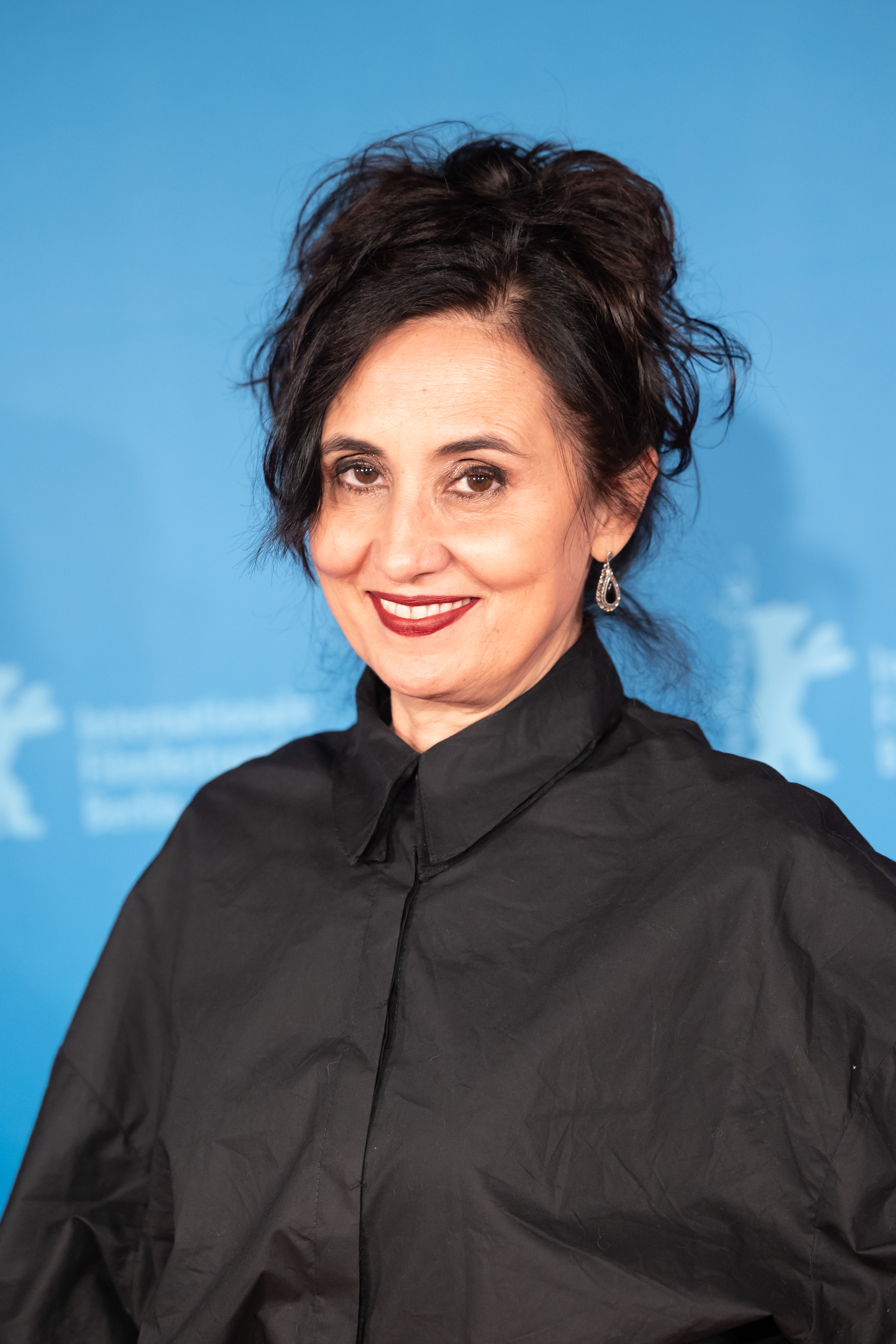
- Vianna at the Berlinale 2024
- Born: 6 January 1965 (age 60); Belo Horizonte, Minas Gerais, Brazil
- Occupations: Actress; Ballerina
- Years active: 1981–present
- Spouse: Rodolfo Vaz (m. 1994)
- Children: 3

Fernanda Vianna (born 6 January 1965) is a Brazilian actress and ballerina.

== Early life ==
Due to the influence of her uncle Klauss Vianna, in 1981, Vianna began working as a ballerina with the Transforma Group. However, in 1995, she changed professions and joined Grupo Galpão, a street theater group, replacing Wanda Fernandes as the title character in Gabriel Villela's celebrated staging of "Romeo and Juliet". With Galpão, Vianna traveled to theater festivals throughout the country and internationally as well.

== Career ==
In cinema, Vianna starred in "What Moves Us" (2012), by Caetano Gotardo, which earned her the Kikito for Best Actress at the Gramado Film Festival.

In 2017, she directed the children's show “Berenice and Soriano” by Manuela Dias. That same year, she played the title character in the Globo Minas end-of-year special, "Rita's Christmas", by Ricardo Alves Jr,.

== Personal life ==
Fernanda is married to actor Rodolfo Vaz.

== Filmography ==
=== Television ===
- 2005 - Today is Maria's Day.... Choir
- 2010 - The Cure - Reporter
- 2013 - Beyond the Horizon.... Berenice
- 2016 - Justice.... Lucy
- 2017 - Rita's Christmas.... Rita

=== Films ===
Year	Title	Character	Notes	Ref
2005	Wine of Roses	Antônia		
2008	Sand Fairies		Short film	
2009	Moscow	Herself	Documentary	
