= Partida da Monção =

Painting by José Ferraz de Almeida Júnior

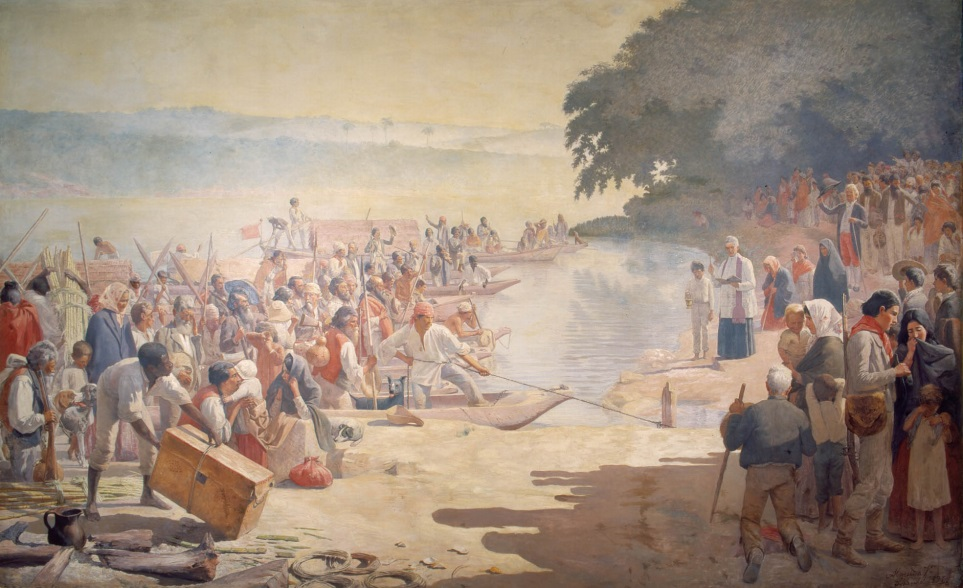
- Artist: Almeida Júnior
- Year: 1897
- Medium: Oil on canvas
- Dimensions: 390 cm × 640 cm (153 1/2 in × 252 in)
- Location: Museu do Ipiranga; São Paulo

Estudo para Partida da Monção or Departure for Monsoon is an oil painting on a canvas that was completed in 1897 by Brazilian painter Almeida Júnior, a representation of Brazilian naturalism and realism.

Currently, the work is housed at the Museu do Ipiranga in São Paulo. It is quite a large painting, with dimensions of 390 by 640 centimeters (13 by 21 feet).

The "monsoon" is a reference to the Portuguese term for a river expedition from coastal to inland Brazil, known as "monsoons", which were common during the late 18th and early 19th centuries. The painting has a scene of the Port of Araritaguaba (now Porto Feliz, in São Paulo), on the banks of the Tietê River. The destination was Cuiabá, located in Mato Grosso, Brazil.
