= Belmiro de Almeida =

Brazilian artist (1858–1935)

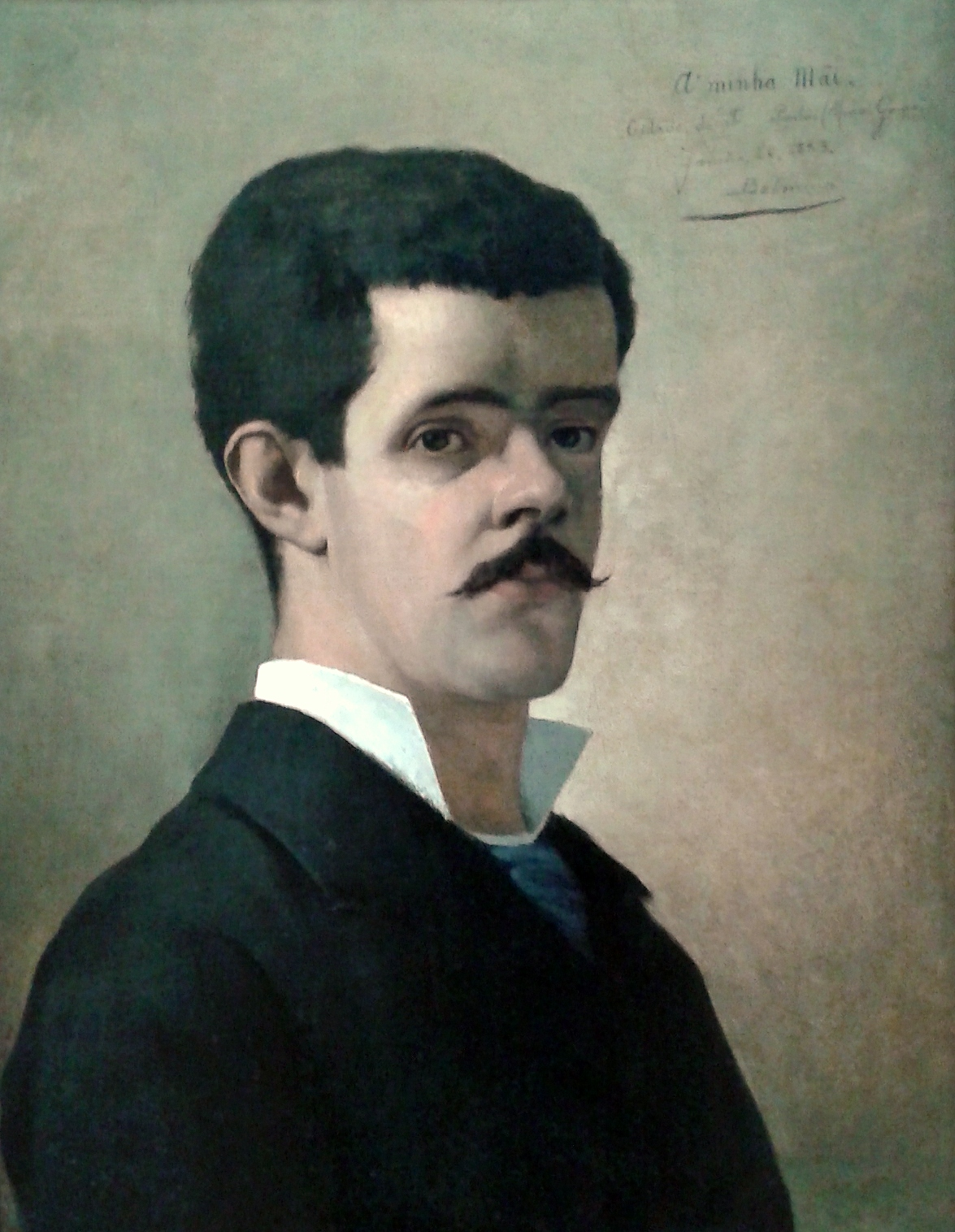
Self-portrait (1883)

Belmiro Barbosa de Almeida (22 May 1858 –12 June 1935) was a Brazilian painter, illustrator, sculptor and caricaturist. He is the Patron of the 39th chair of the Brazilian Academy of Fine Arts.

== Biography ==
Almeida was born in Serro. His first lessons were at the "Liceu de Artes e Ofícios" (School of Arts and Crafts) in Rio de Janeiro. Later, he enrolled at the Academia Imperial de Belas Artes, where he studied with Agostinho José da Mota and João Zeferino da Costa.

In the late 1880s, he travelled to Rome and Paris, where he studied at the Académie Julian, worked in the studios of Jules Lefebvre and participated in several Salons. After that time, having become enamored of the French capitol, he alternated his residence between Paris and Rio de Janeiro. In Brazil, from 1893 to 1896, he held the Chair of Drawing at the old "Escola Nacional de Belas Artes" (now part of the Federal University of Rio de Janeiro), substituting for Pedro Weingärtner. In 1916, he was appointed to the Chair for drawing from live models.

During this time, he also provided illustrations and caricatures for several local publications. As a sculptor, he is best known for his figure of Manequinho (modeled after the Mannekin Pis in Brussels), which is on a public square in front of the Botafogo de Futebol e Regatas clubhouse and has become the club's mascot.

He settled in Paris permanently after World War I, but continued to participate in the "Exposições Gerals de Belas Artes", winning the Grand Gold Medal in 1921. Perhaps his most famous painting is Arrufos (The Spat), which used the art critic Gonzaga Duque as a model. In turn, Almeida inspired a character in Duque's novel Mocidade Morta (The Death of Youth, 1899).

Almeida died in Paris on 12 June 1935.

== Selected paintings ==
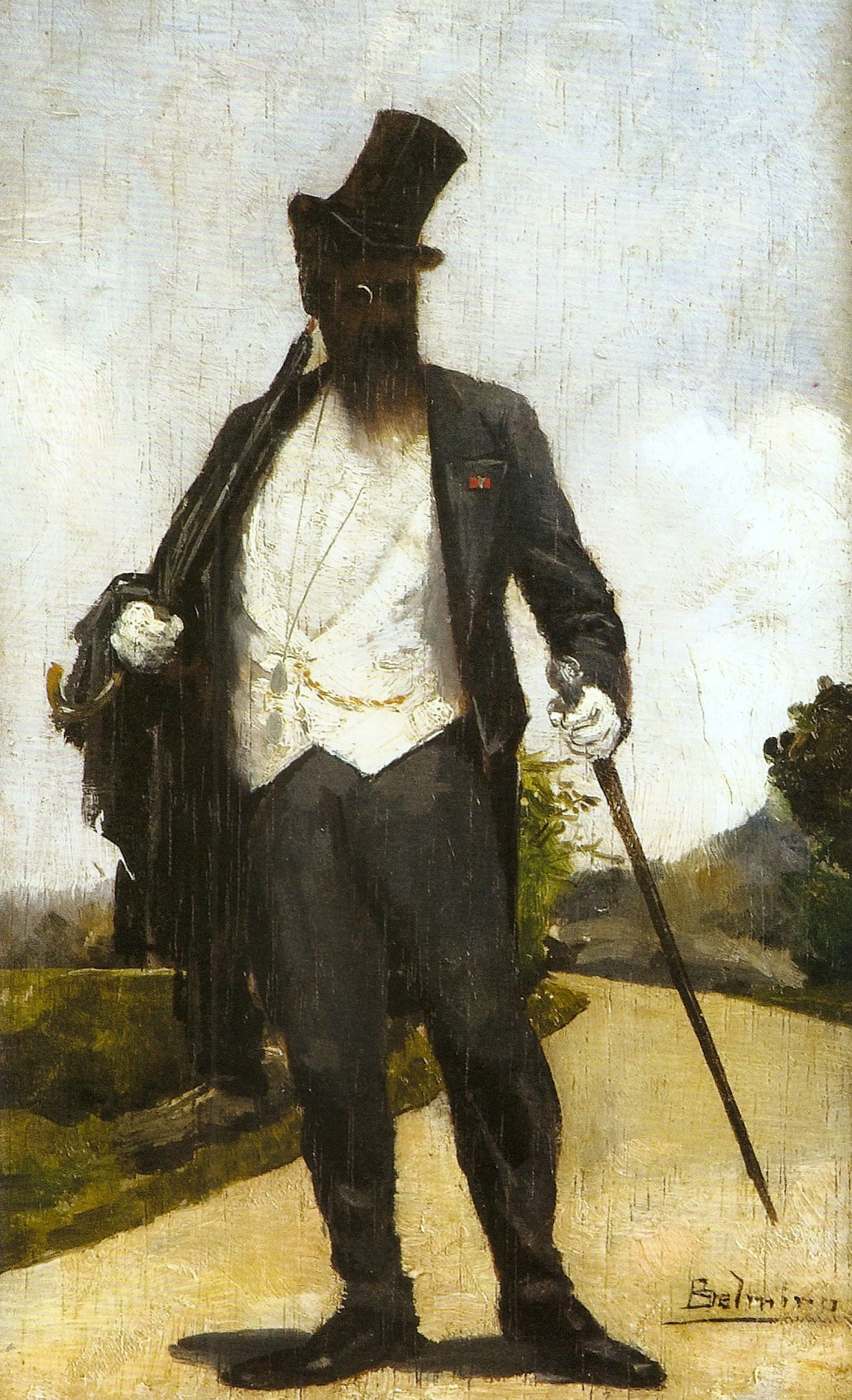
Prince Obá (1886)

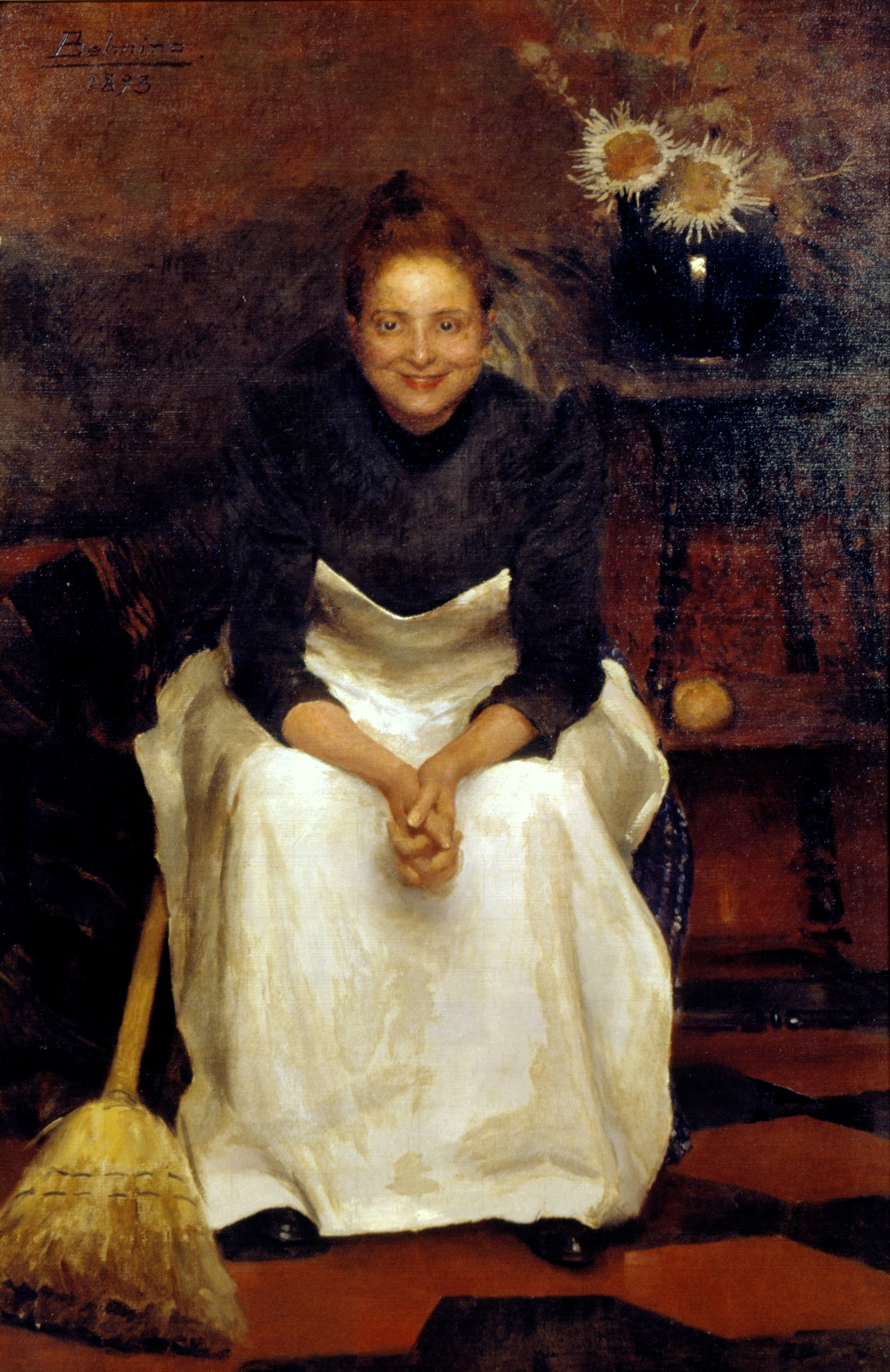
The Chatterbox (1893)

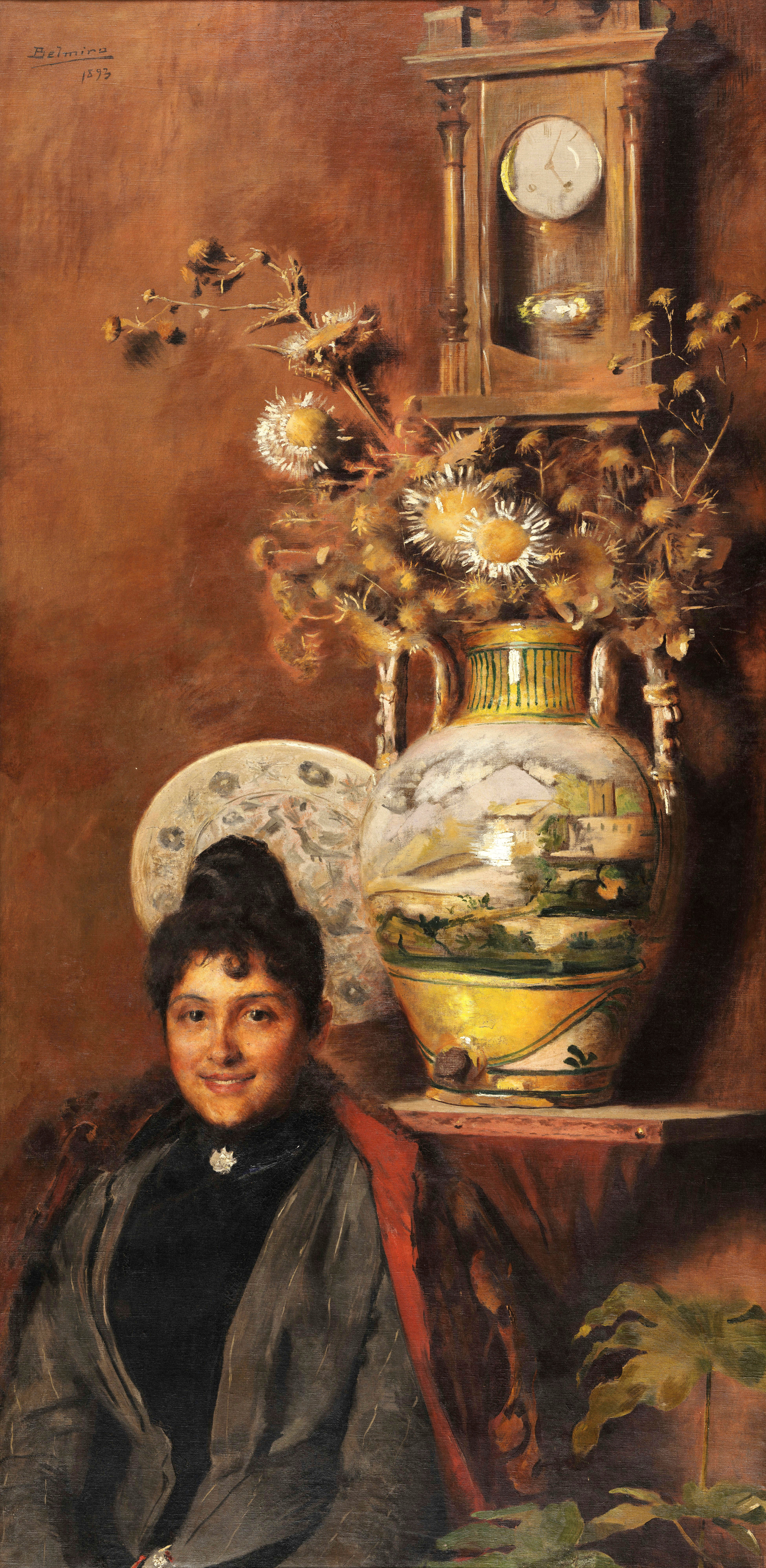
Vase with Flowers (1893)

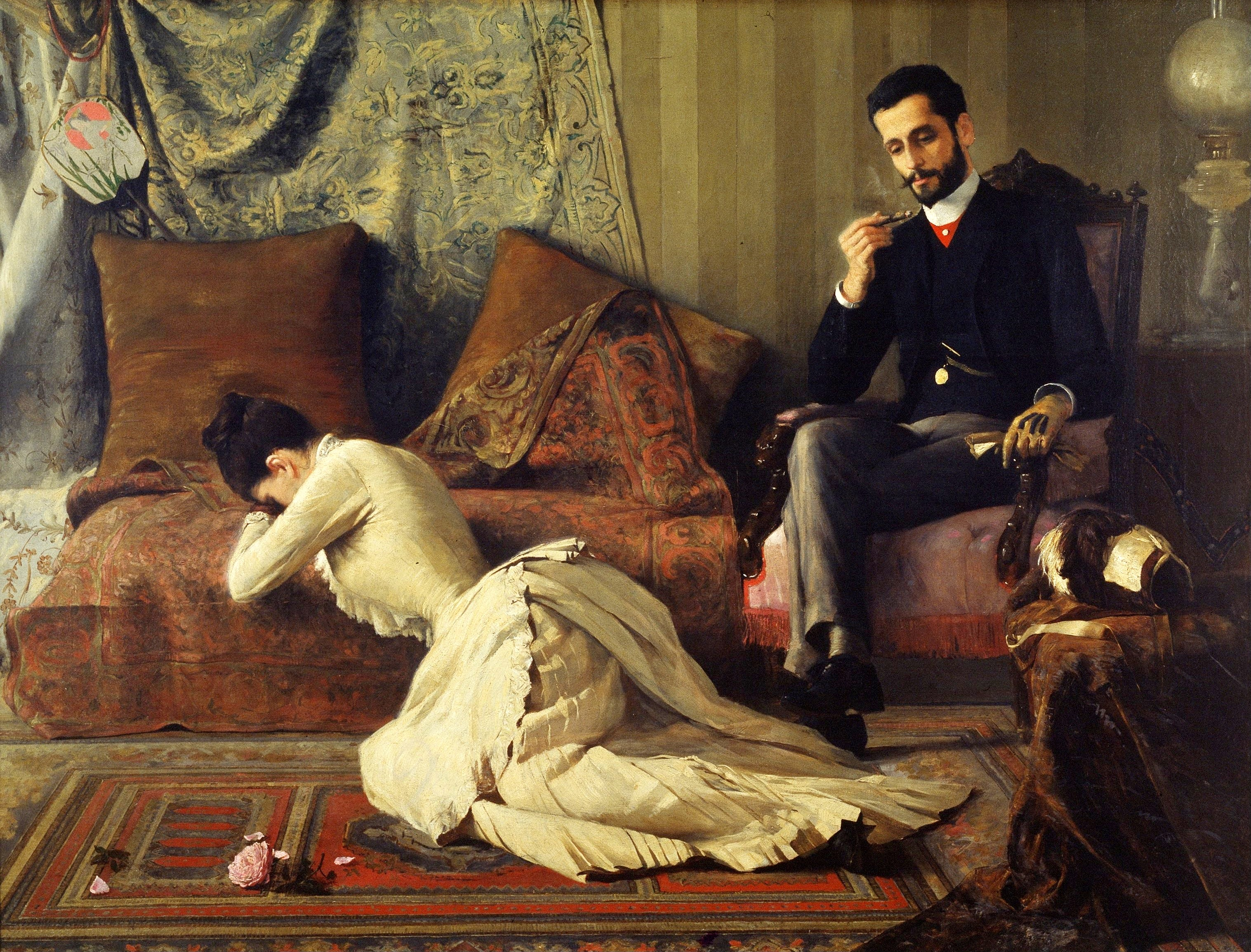
Arrufos
(The Spat; 1887)

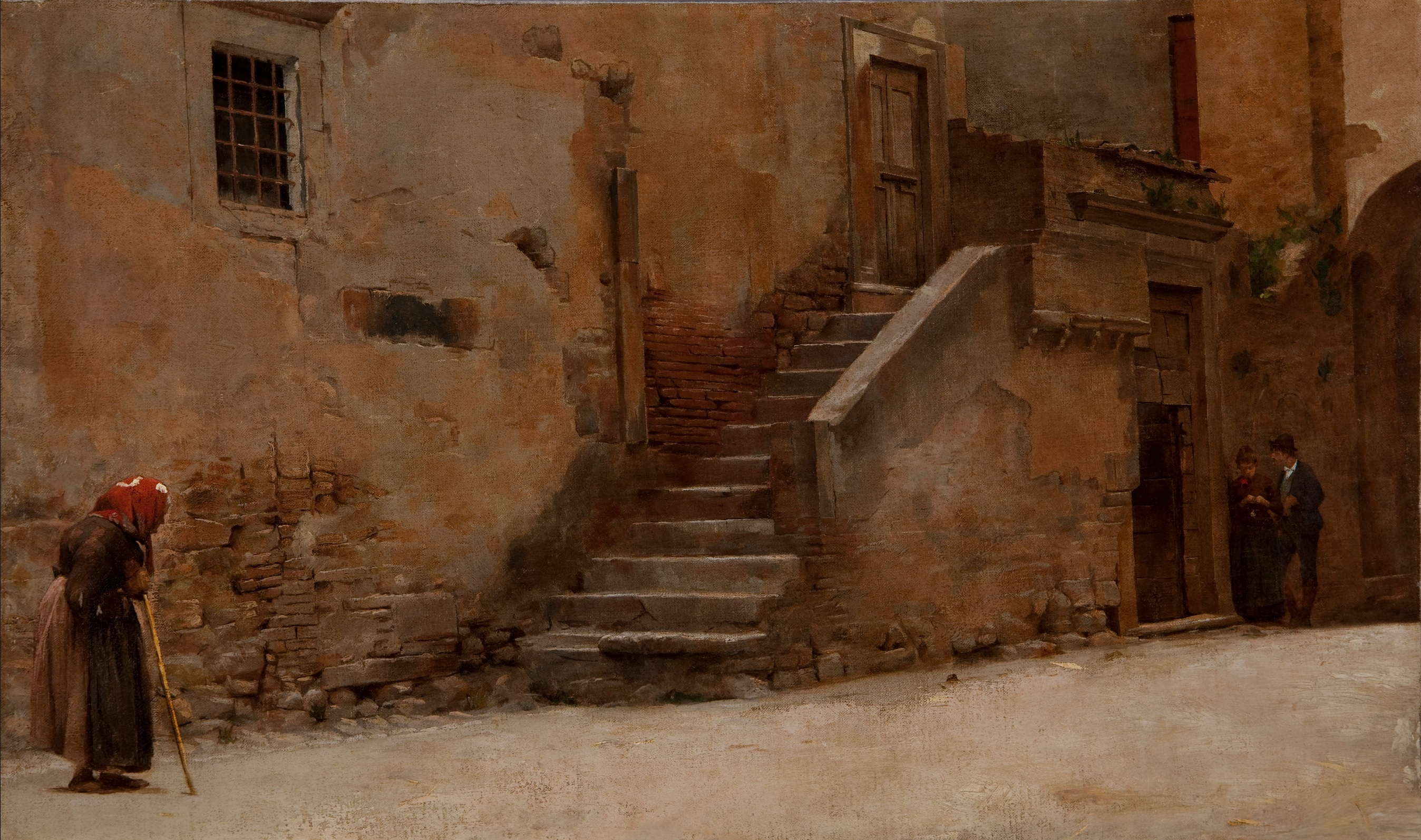
Street in Italy (c. 1889)

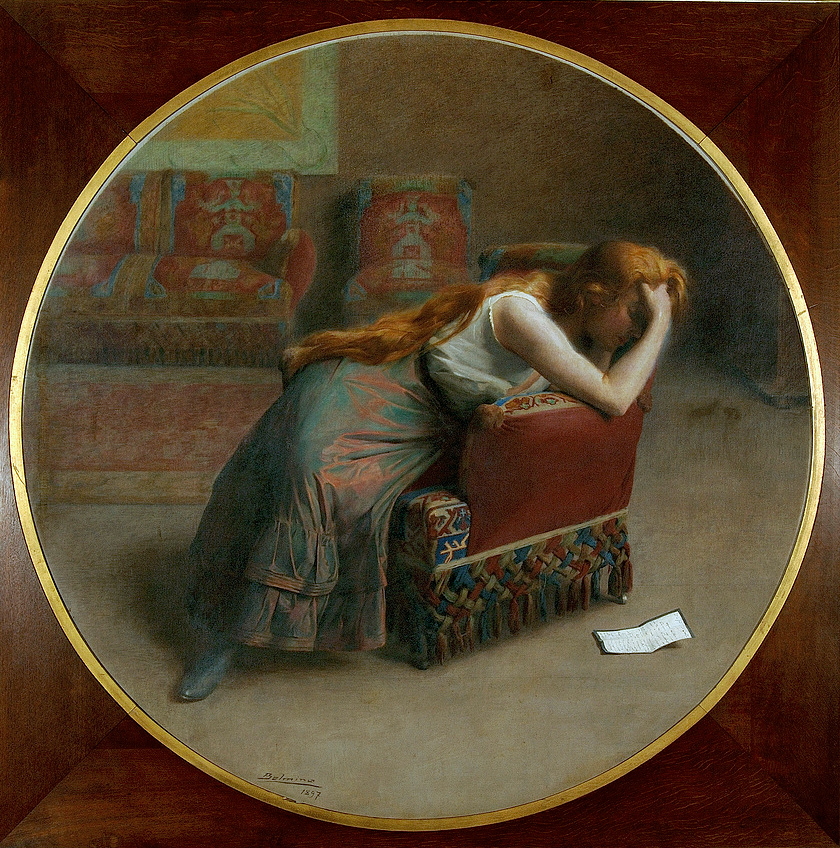
A Má Notícia (1897)

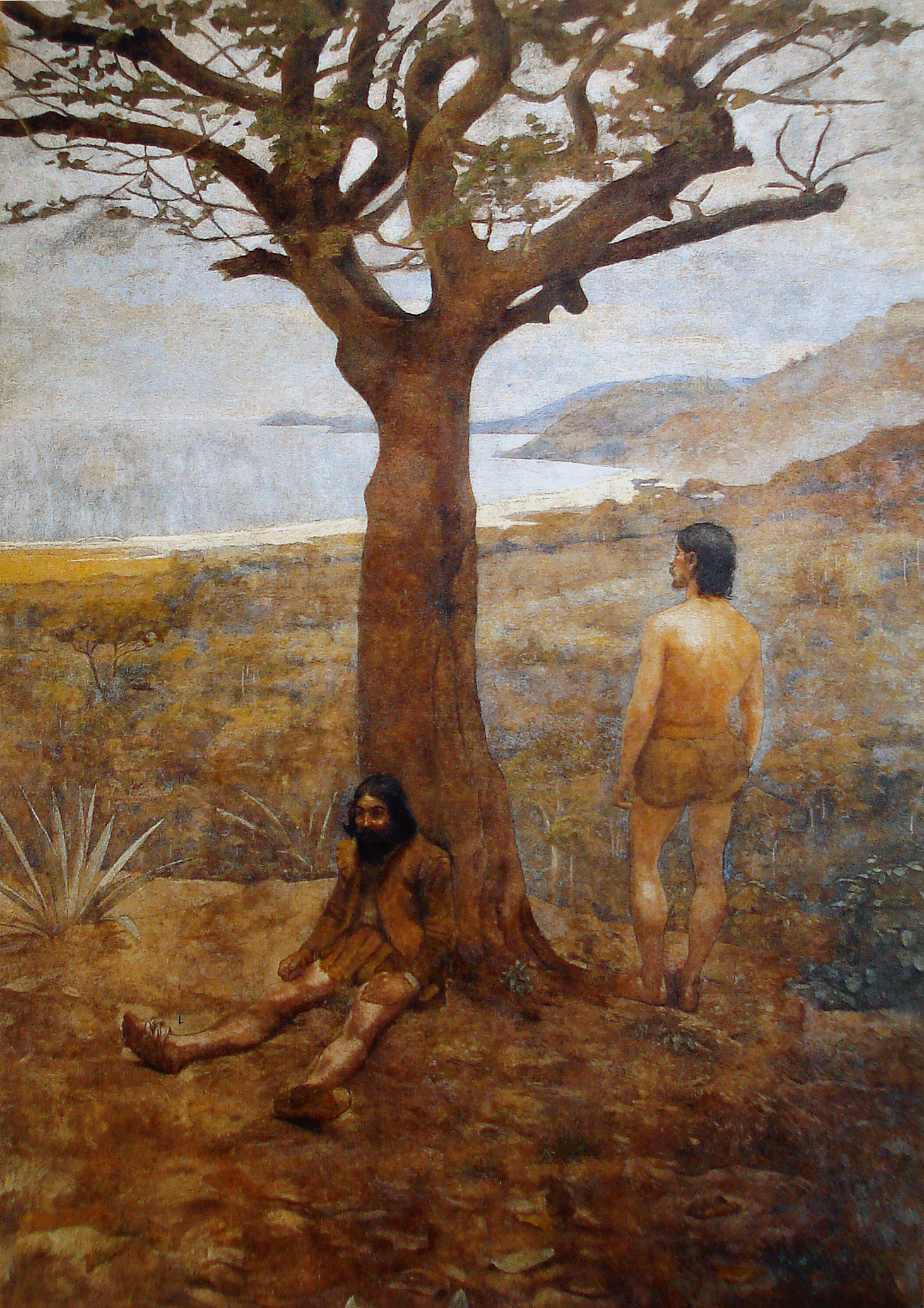
The Discoverers (1899)

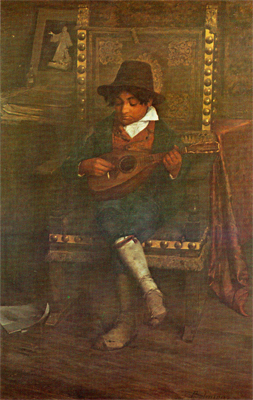
Boy with Mandolin (1890s)

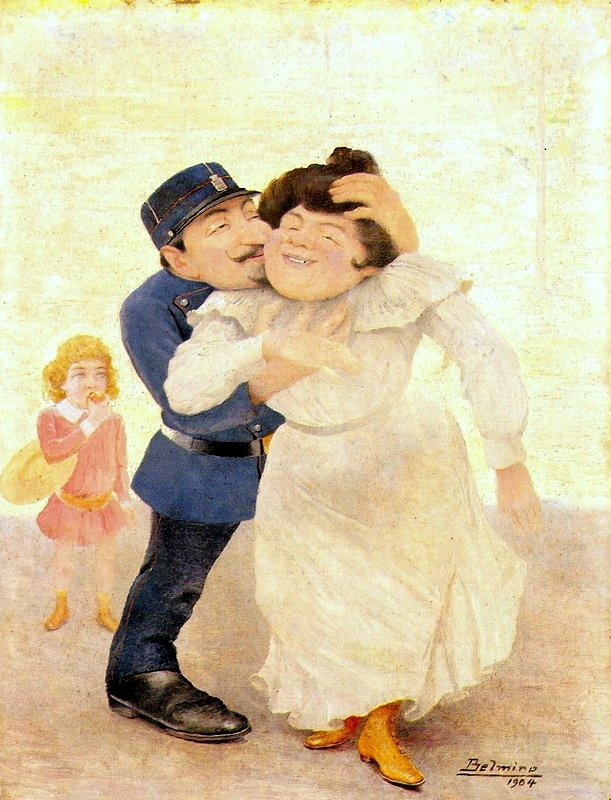
The Guard's Flirt (1904)

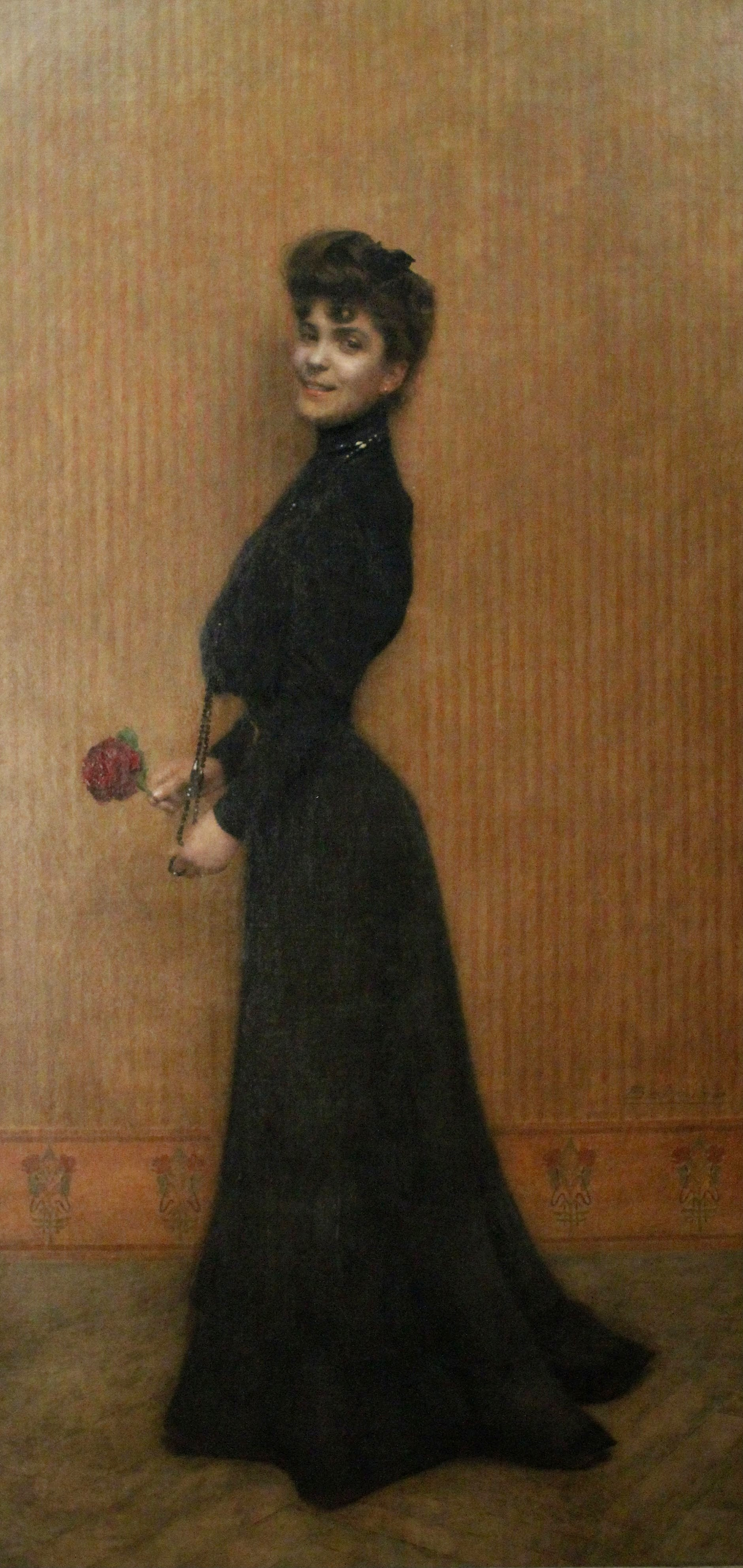
Lady with Rose (c.1905)
