= Klauss Vianna =

Brazilian dancer, choreographer, and theater director

Klauss Ribeiro Vianna (12 August 1928 – 12 April 1992) was a Brazilian dancer, choreographer and theater director.

== Biography ==
Klauss Vianna was born in Belo Horizonte, in 1928, the son of physician João Ribeiro Vianna and the nurse Erna Maria Hapke Vianna, a native of Germany.

In 1944, he started taking classic ballet lessons with Carlos Leite and later, in 1949, with Maria Olenewa in São Paulo. In Salvador, he studied dance and anatomy applied to movement. In 1952, he started teaching dance in an improvised atelier in his own house, where he lived with his grandmother. In 1954, he would dance for the last time under another choreographer, his former teacher Carlos Leite. In 1955, the dancer and choreographer met his future wife Angel Vianna, who would continue his work after the choreographer's death. His first choreography was performed in Rio de Janeiro in 1957 and in 1959 he founded the Ballet Klauss Vianna. Between 1966 and 1980 he was the ballet director for the Teatro Municipal in Rio de Janeiro and between 1981 and 1985 the artistic director of Balé Cidade de São Paulo. In 1990, he publishes the book A dança (The dance), in which he compiles his ideas and choreographical techniques. The choreographer died in São Paulo in 1992 of heart problems.

== Selected works ==
- Caso do vestido (1955)
- Cobra grande (1957)
- Arabela, a donzela e o mito (1960)
- Navalha na carne (1965)
- O jardim das cerejeiras (1966)
- O arquiteto e o imperador (1970)
- As hienas (1971)
- A dama de copas e o rei de Cuba (1974)
- Teu nome é mulher (1978)
