= Gonzaga Duque =

Brazilian writer, historian and critic

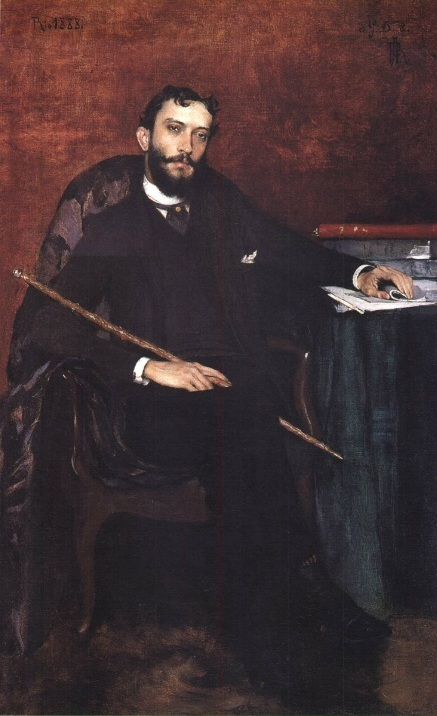
- Portrait by Rodolfo Amoedo, 1888
- Born: Luís Gonzaga Duque Estrada; 21 June 1863; Brazil
- Died: 29 September 1911; Brazil
- Occupations: Writer, historian, art critic
- Known for: Mocidade Morta; A Arte Brasileira

Luís Gonzaga Duque Estrada (21 June 1863 – 29 September 1911), better known as Gonzaga Duque, was a Brazilian writer, historian and critic.

== Life and work ==
He was of Swedish descent on his father's side. After completing his primary education, he enrolled at the prestigious Colégio Abílio, then studied at the Colégio Meneses Vieira. He completed his studies at the Colégio Paixão in Petrópolis. It would appear that he never attended a university.

His best known work, the novel Mocidade Morta (1900, Dead Youth), deals with young artists during the Second Reign, a period from 1840 to 1889, when the Republic of Brazil was established, and their opposition to the prevailing conservativism. The initial reviews were not kind; calling it boring, morbid and full of pseudo-intellectual chatter. Later, it received some praise for its documentary value. Recent criticism calls it a significant contribution to understanding the artistic community of late 19th century Brazil and its relationship to the outdated approaches taught at the Imperial Academy of Fine Arts.

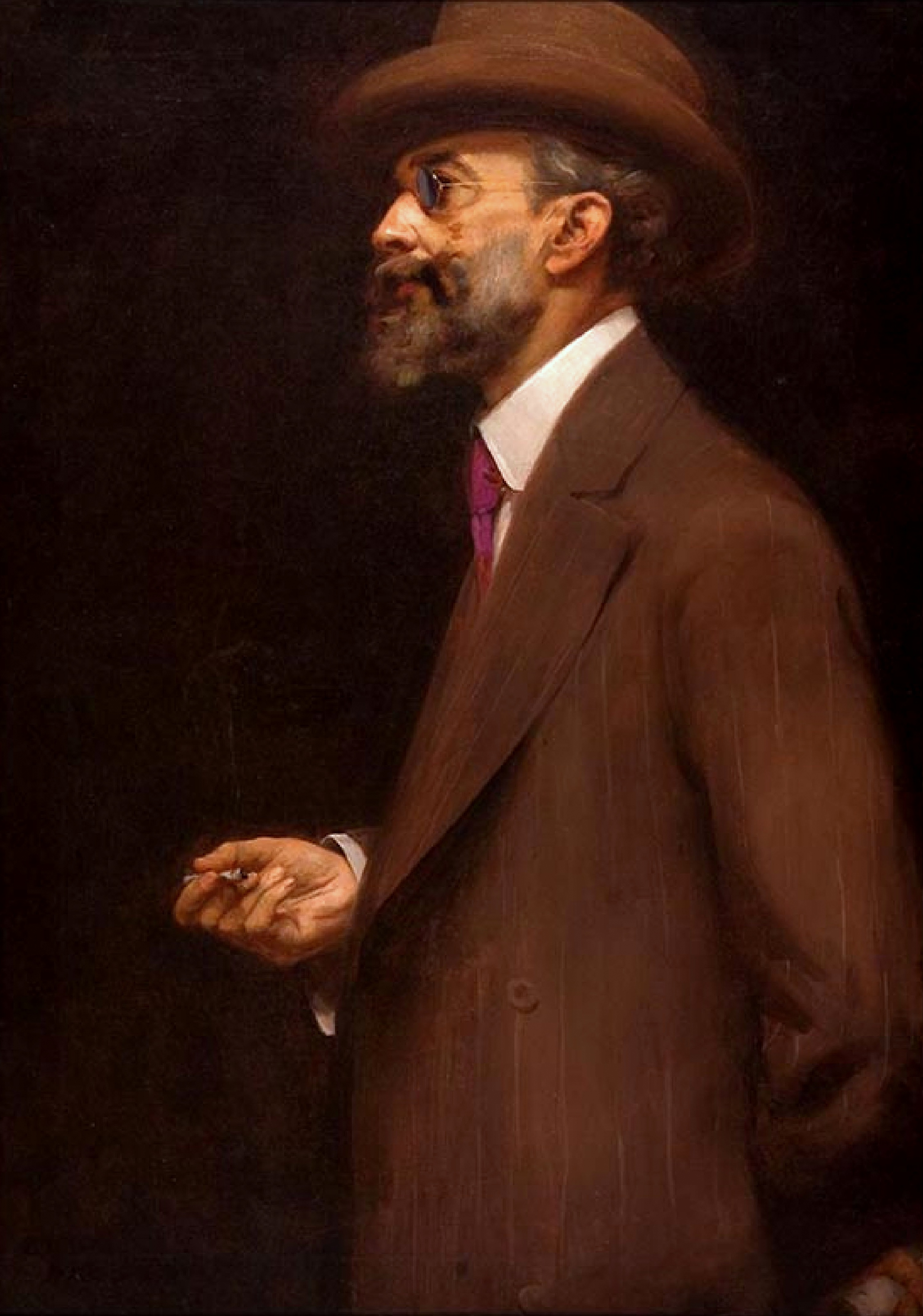
Portrait of Duque by Eliseu Visconti (1911)

As a critic, he produced the first systematic examination of Brazilian art in his book A Arte Brasileira. This came during a period when the artists there were beginning to make a living entirely from the proceeds of their painting. In 1907, he was a co-founder of the cultural journal, Fon-Fon. Known to be an unsparing critic in the cause of modernism, his caustic comments about the works of João Zeferino da Costa, who worked in a conservative, classical style, discouraged Da Costa from ever exhibiting again.

A familiar face among Rio's artistic milieu, his portrait was painted by Eliseu Visconti, Belmiro de Almeida, Rodolfo Amoedo and Presciliano Silva, among others. The Brazilian art scholar, Vera Lins, has done a thorough study of his work, which is available online.

== Bibliography ==
- A Arte Brasileira. São Paulo: Mercado de Letras, 1994.
- Mocidade Morta. Rio de Janeiro: Fundação Casa de Rui Barbosa, 1995
- Horto de Mágoas - contos, Vera Lins and Júlio Castañon Guimaraes, Eds. Prefeitura da Cidade do Rio de Janeiro, 1996.
- Impressões de um Amador: textos esparsos de crítica, 1882-1909, Vera Lins and Júlio Castañon Guimaraes, Eds. Belo Horizonte: Editora UFMG, 2001.
- Revoluções brasileiras: resumos históricos. Francisco Foot Hardman and Vera Lins, Eds. Belo Horizonte: Editora UFMG, co-edição Giordano, 1998.
