= Sociedade Brasileira de Belas Artes =

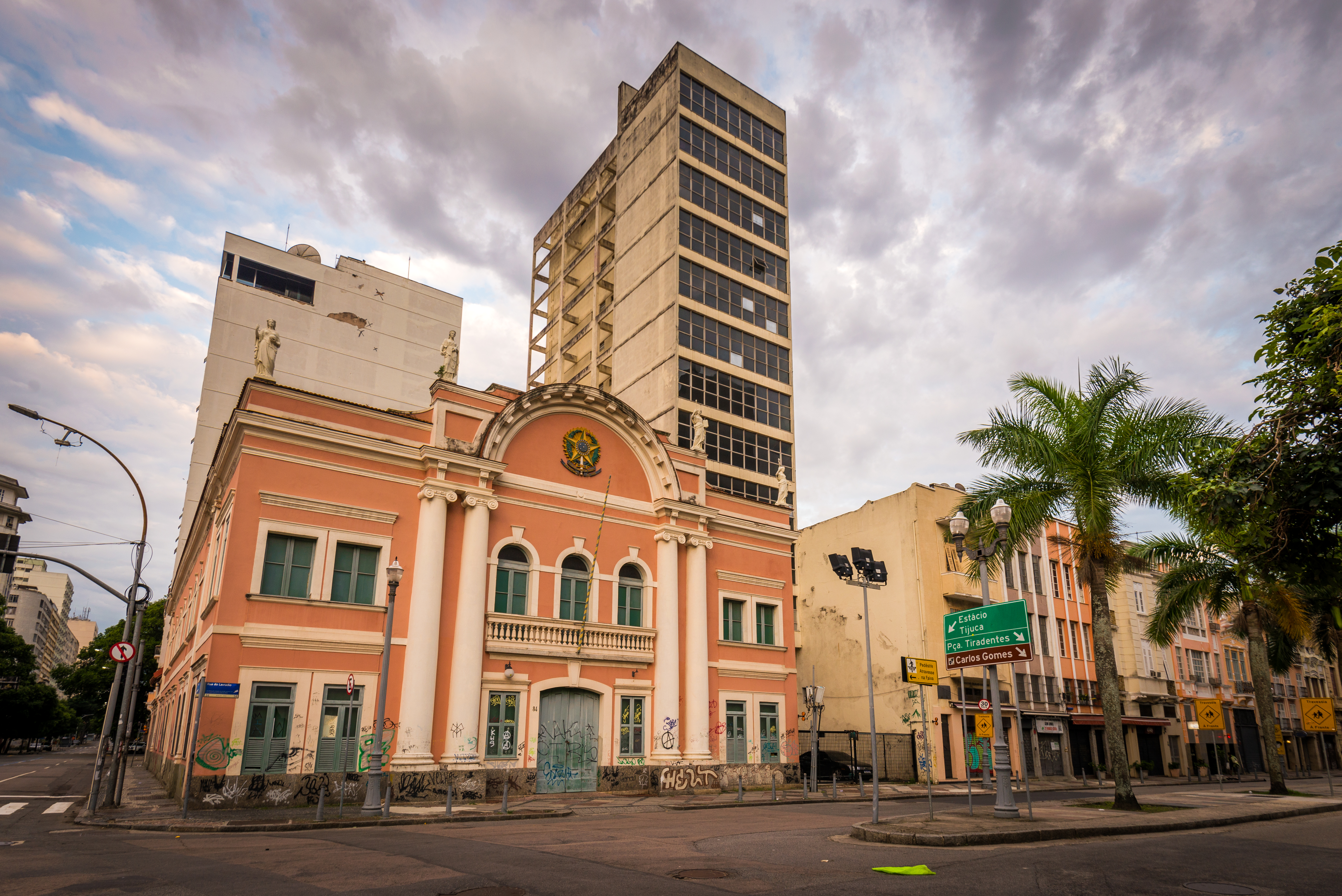

The Sociedade Brasileira de Belas Artes SBBA (Brazilian Society of Fine Arts SBBA) is a public benefit entity that aims to promote and disseminate plastic arts. The SBBA is located in the historic building of the 18th century Solar do Marques do Lavradio in downtown Rio de Janeiro, in the Lapa neighborhood, at Rua do Lavradio, nº 84.

== History ==
The Sociedade Brasileira de Belas Artes SBBA was founded on August 10, 1910, in Rio de Janeiro under the name Centro Artístico Juventas and, on July 1, 1919, the definitive name of “Sociedade Brasileira de Belas Artes” was approved. With a decree of the Republic of the United States of Brazil of September 20, 1922, SBBA is considered to be a public benefit entity whose objective is the promotion of fine arts.

Over the years, the Society has had to change its headquarters several times and it has been doing academic work to disseminate and teach plastic arts techniques. The Brazilian Society of Fine Arts has an important art collection that was accumulated from 1960 and listed in 1985 by the National Institute of Historic and Artistic Heritage and which it collects period objects and furniture and houses works by Brazilian and international artists such as, among others, Arthur Timótheo da Costa, Eliseu Visconti, Marques Júnior, Manuel de Araújo Porto-Alegre and Candido Portinari.

== Bibliography ==
- HILLAL, Therezinha. Renacer da Fhoenix, Nos 105 Anos de Arte Sociedade Brasileira de Belas Artes SBBA, Editora Comunità LTDA, Niterói, RJ, 2015
- CARDOSO, Rafael. “Boêmia inspiração”. Revista de História da Biblioteca Nacional. n.35, ago/2008.
- LEITE, José Roberto Teixeira. Dicionário Crítico da Pintura no Brasil. Rio de Janeiro: Artlivre, 1988. (Verbetes: Centro Artístico Juventas, pp. 117–118; Chambelland, Rodolfo. pp118–119; Sociedade Brasileira de Artes Plásticas, p. 484; Tímótheo da Costa, Artur. p. 508).
- RUBENS, Carlos. Pequena História das Artes Plásticas no Brasil. São Paulo: Companhia Editora Nacional, 1941. (pp. 376–378)
- FARIA COUTO, André Luiz. Graduação em História pela Universidade Federal Fluminense (UFF).
