= João Timóteo da Costa =

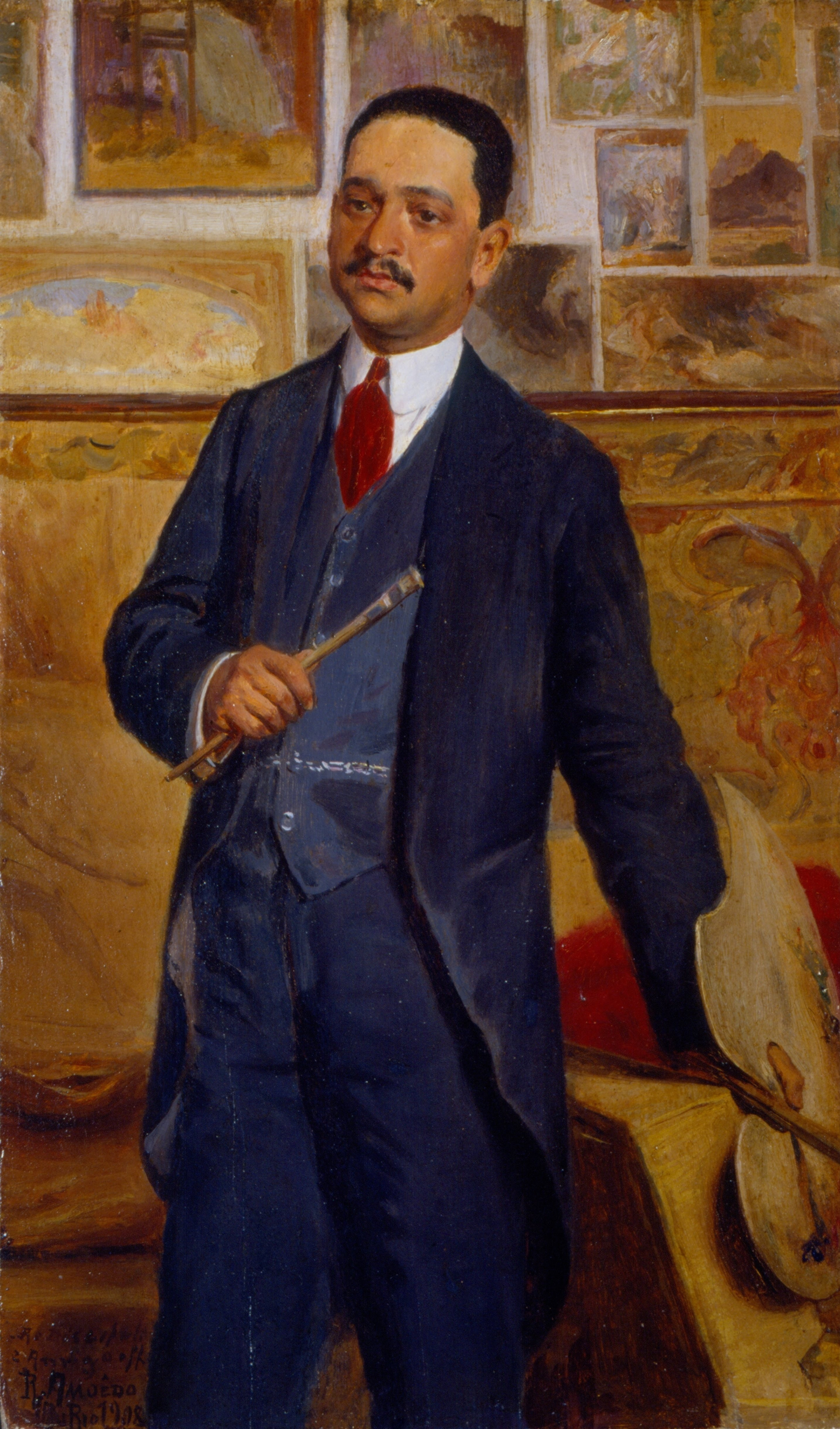
João Timóteo da Costa; portrait by Rodolfo Amoedo (1908)

João Timóteo da Costa (1879 – 20 March 1932) was an Afro-Brazilian painter and decorative artist. His artstyle tended to be more academic and impressionist, and he was a well known artist from the late nineteenth century to the early twentieth century. Black artists were often poorly treated, but despite that it was one of the few ways to move up the social hierarchy. His parents, with no ties to enslavement, sent their sons to the first training classes ever held at the ENBA, the brothers of João Timóteo da Costa. João Timotheo da Costa was in a family that pushed to be involved in the arts, his grandfather Henrique Alves de Mesquita was a black musician, composer, and conductor, and he was taught at the Paris Conservatory during the 1850s. The Escolas Nacional de Belas Arts was established in order to spread the education and culture of the arts, and the da Costa brothers enrolled there despite the difficulties of being a black artist.

== Biography ==
João Timóteo da Costa was born in Rio de Janeiro, from an Afro-Brazilian family eminent in the arts mechanics and liberal arts. Since his background views the arts as a way to climb up the social ladder, he and his brother Arthur Timótheo da Costa, attended the Mint. A semi boarding school in Rio de Janeiro that’s market is usually young black working people like João. There, the brothers designed stamps and created prints. In 1894 when he turned 15, he and his brother Arthur, were one of the few black artists enrolled in the National Institute of Fine Arts or the Escola Nacional de Belas Artes (ENBA). João started on his first works there. His instructors included Rodolfo Amoedo, João Zeferino da Costa and Daniel Bérard (1846–1910).

He participated in the Exposições Gerais de Belas Artes on numerous occasions after 1906, winning several prizes; including the small gold medal.

João Timóteo da Costa spent his whole life in Rio de Janeiro while occasionally travelling abroad to work for the Brazilian government. His work was commission painting and focused more on landscapes, yet he painted; portraits of republican figures, decorations on institutions, and on public buildings.

In 1911, he and Arthur managed to open their own personal studio located in Catumbi, and then moved on to their own personal space. Even though their location was out of the way, the da Costa brothers still managed to get business with their renowned reputation for doing business with high society. Another achievement of his in 1911, together with his brother and the brothers Carlos and Rodolfo Chambelland, he worked on decorating the Brazilian pavilion at the Turin International exhibition, and remained in Italy for more than a year.

João Timóteo da Costa was famous among the Brazilian elites, despite discrimination and the deprecation of black and other non white ethnicities being deeply integrated from colonial times. Even with this attention he still faced racism, being racialized in the news, being considered “accomplished for a mulatto”.

Among his other notable decorative works were the headquarters of the Fluminense Football Club, the Noble Hall of the Tiradentes Palace and murals at Copacabana Palace, all in Rio de Janeiro.

In 1932, João Timóteo da Costa ended up in the Rio de Janeiro Hospício Pedro II; the same psychiatric hospital where his brother had died.

== Selected paintings ==
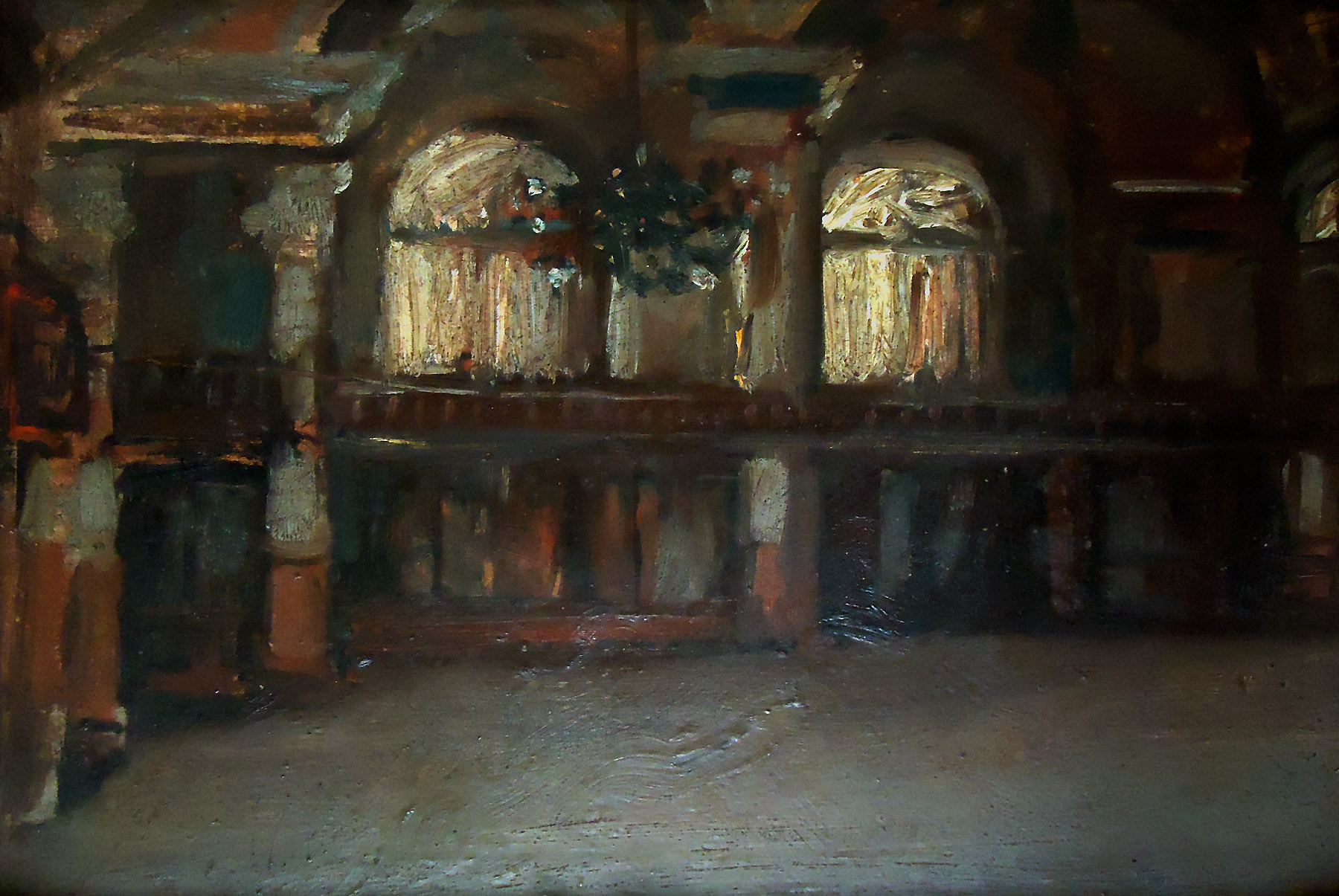
Interior of the Old Jail

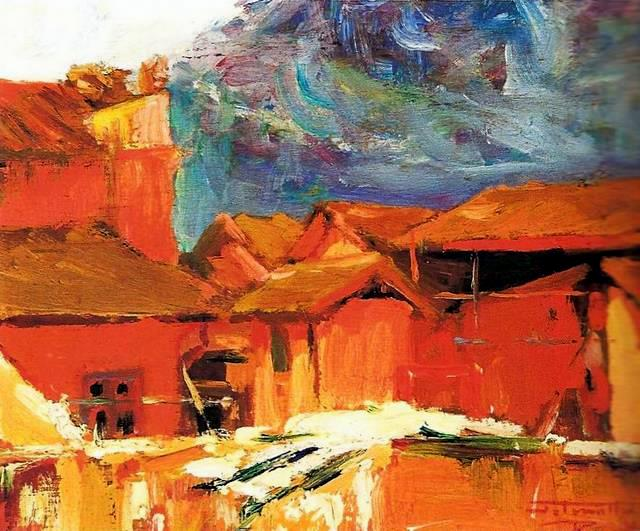
Landscape with Houses

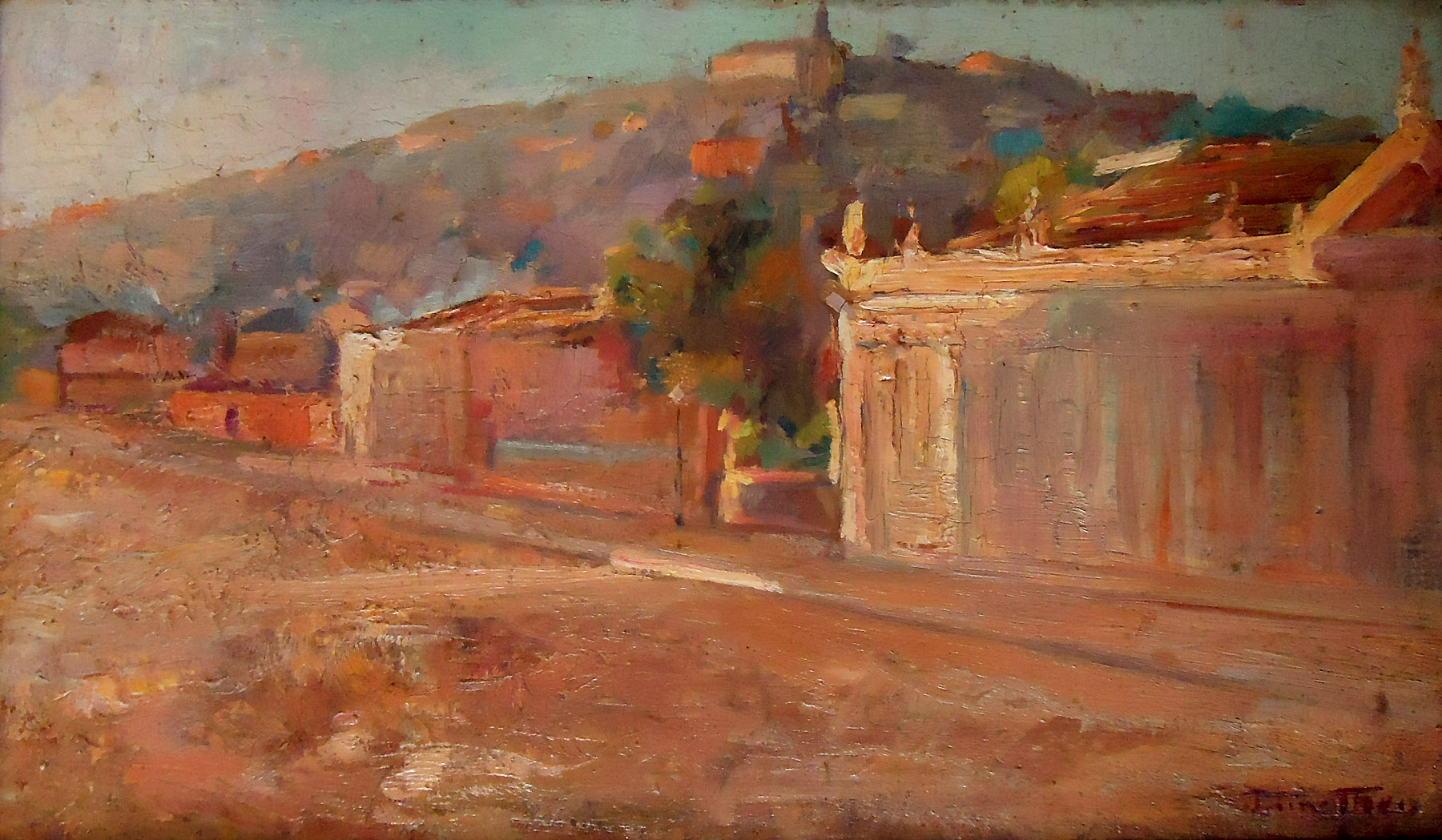
Reflections of the Sun on a Hill

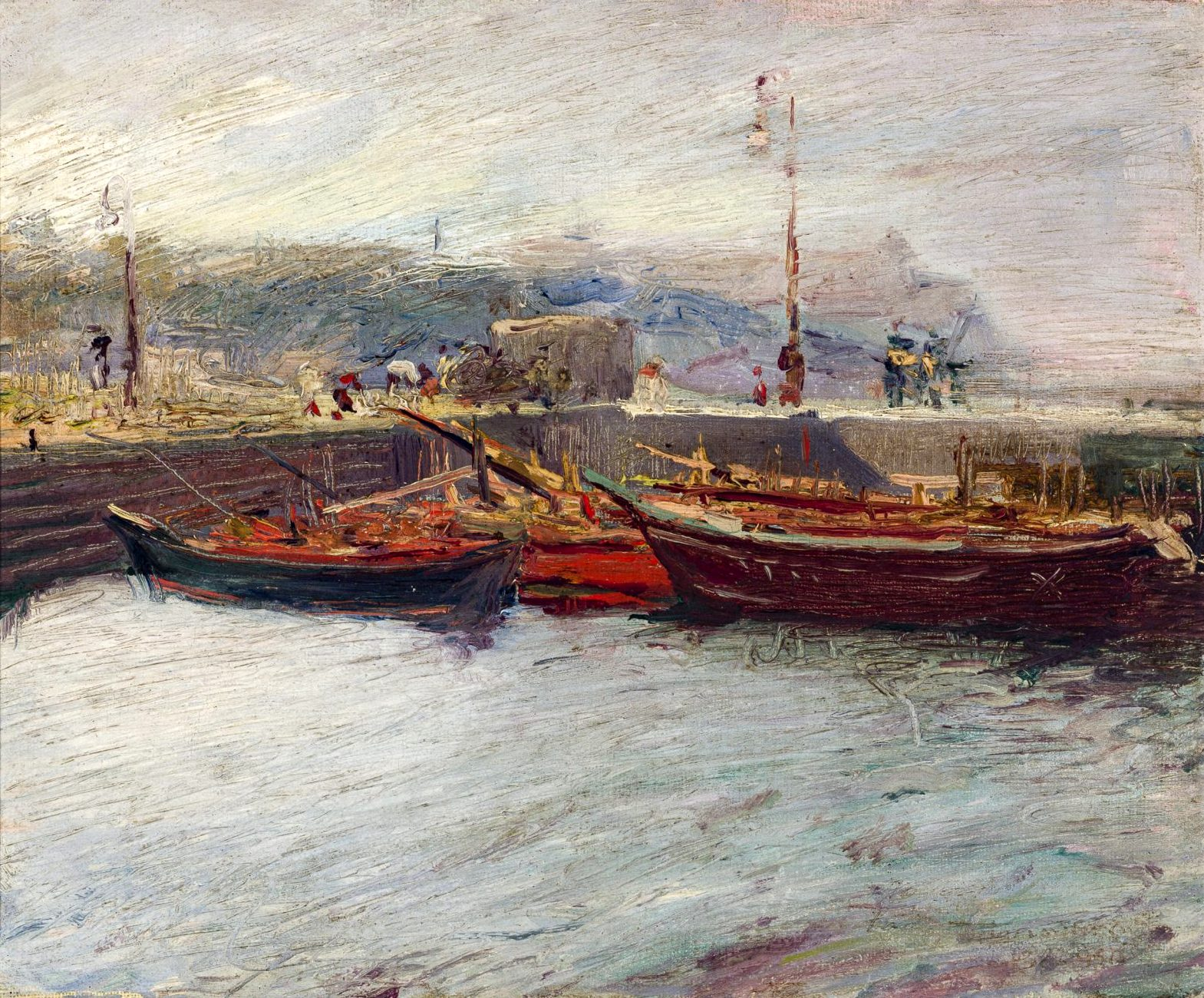
Ships
