= Rodolfo Amoedo =

Brazilian painter (1857–1921)

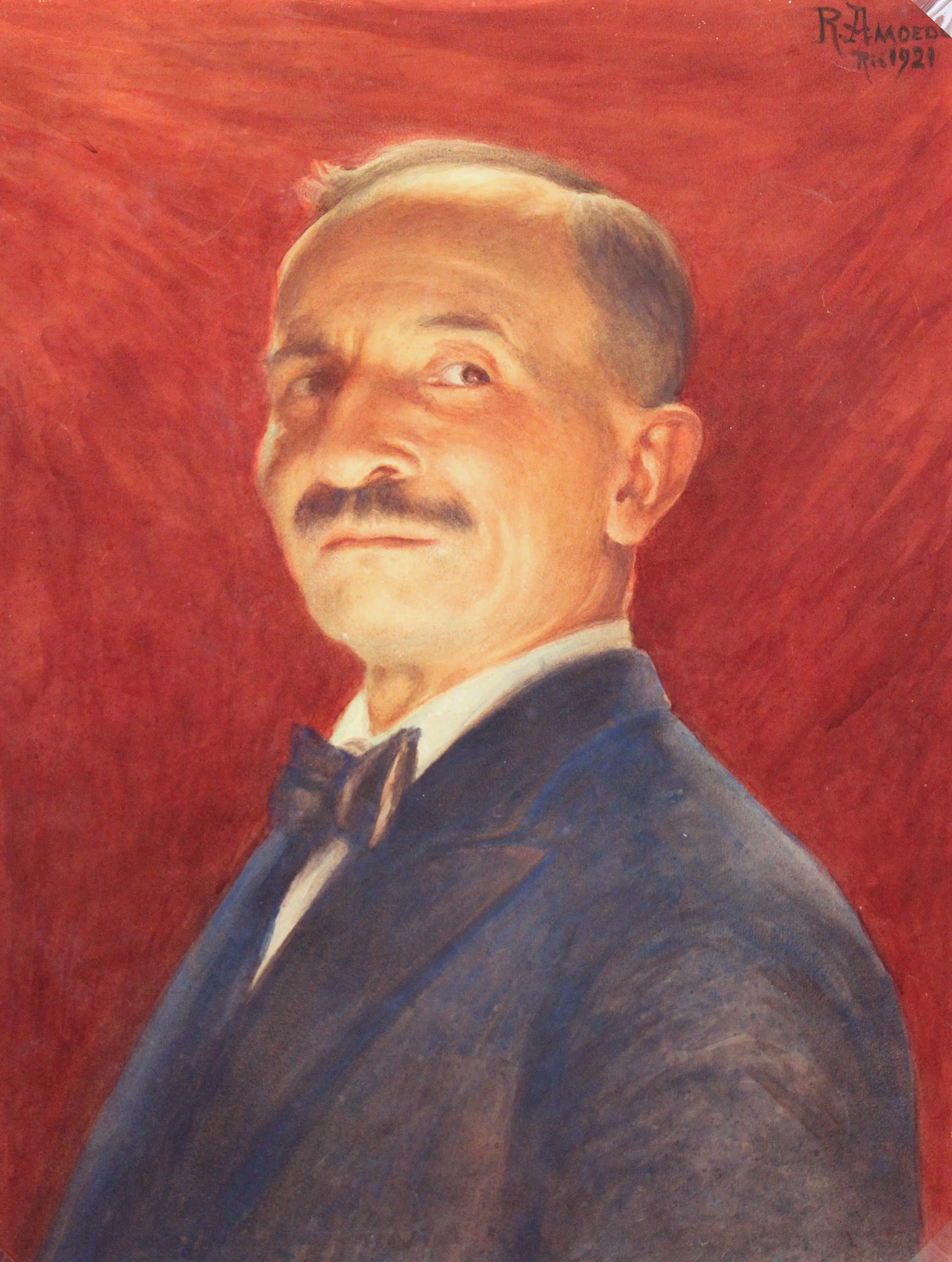
- Rodolfo Amoedo, Self-portrait, 1921
- Born: 11 December 1857; Salvador, Bahia, Brazil
- Died: 31 May 1941 (aged 83); Rio de Janeiro, Brazil
- Education: Liceu de Artes e Ofícios, Rio de Janeiro; Academia Imperial de Belas Artes; École des Beaux-arts, Paris
- Known for: Painting, designing
- Notable work: Más Notícias; O Último Tamoio
- Movement: Orientalist

Rodolfo Amoedo (11 December 1857 – 31 May 1941) was a Brazilian painter, designer and decorator. He is the Patron of the 32nd chair of the Brazilian Academy of Fine Arts.

== Biography ==
His interest in art and decoration began when a family friend invited him to do work on the now defunct Teatro São Pedro. In 1873, he enrolled at the "Liceu de Artes e Ofícios do Rio de Janeiro", where he studied with Victor Meirelles. The following year, he transferred to the Academia Imperial de Belas Artes. His teachers there included João Zeferino da Costa, Agostinho José da Mota and the sculptor Francisco Manuel Chaves Pinheiro. In 1878, his painting on the O Sacrifício de Abel narrowly won him a travel fellowship to study in Europe.

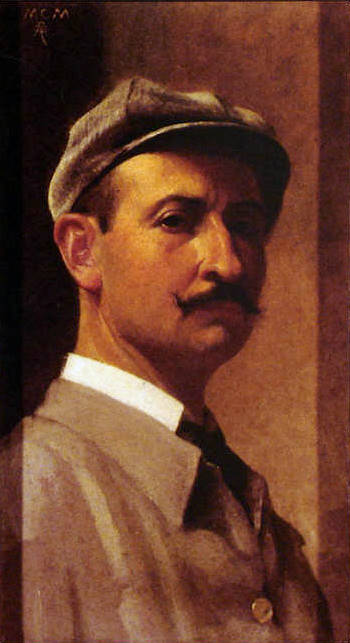
Earlier self-portrait

From 1879 to 1887, he lived and studied in Paris. Initially, he attended the Académie Julian, but finally managed to enroll at the École des Beaux-arts in 1880, where he received the guidance of Alexandre Cabanel, Paul Baudry and Puvis de Chavannes. From 1882 to 1884, he participated in the Salon while developing his primary themes of mythology, Biblical scenarios and Indianismo.

In 1895, he painted Más Notícias. He won a gold medal at the "Exposição Nacional Comemorativa do 1º Centenário da Abertura dos Portos do Brasil" (1908).

He later became a professor at the Escola Nacional de Belas Artes (ENBA), where he encouraged students to research the various process of painting (tempera, encaustic, watercolor etc.). He also served as Vice-Director and Acting Director on several occasions.

In addition to his canvases, he painted panels for the Supremo Tribunal Federal in 1909, the Biblioteca Nacional and the Theatro Municipal do Rio de Janeiro in 1916. Two years later, he was awarded the Second Chair in the School of Painting, a position he held until 1934. Among his best-known students were the brothers Arthur and João Timóteo da Costa, Lucílio de Albuquerque, Eliseu Visconti and Cândido Portinari.

== Selected paintings ==
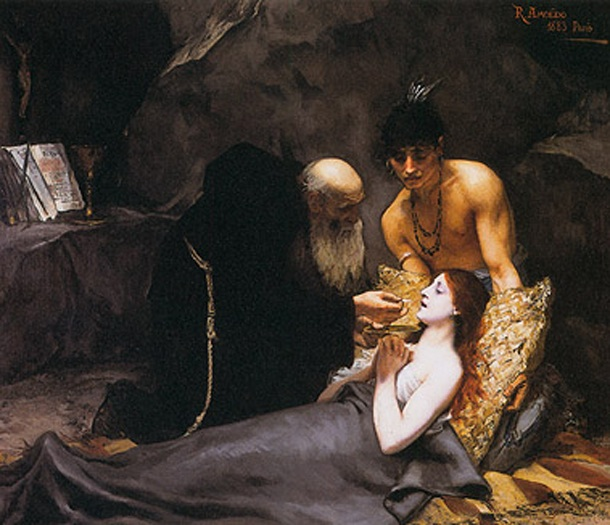
The Death of Atala (1883)

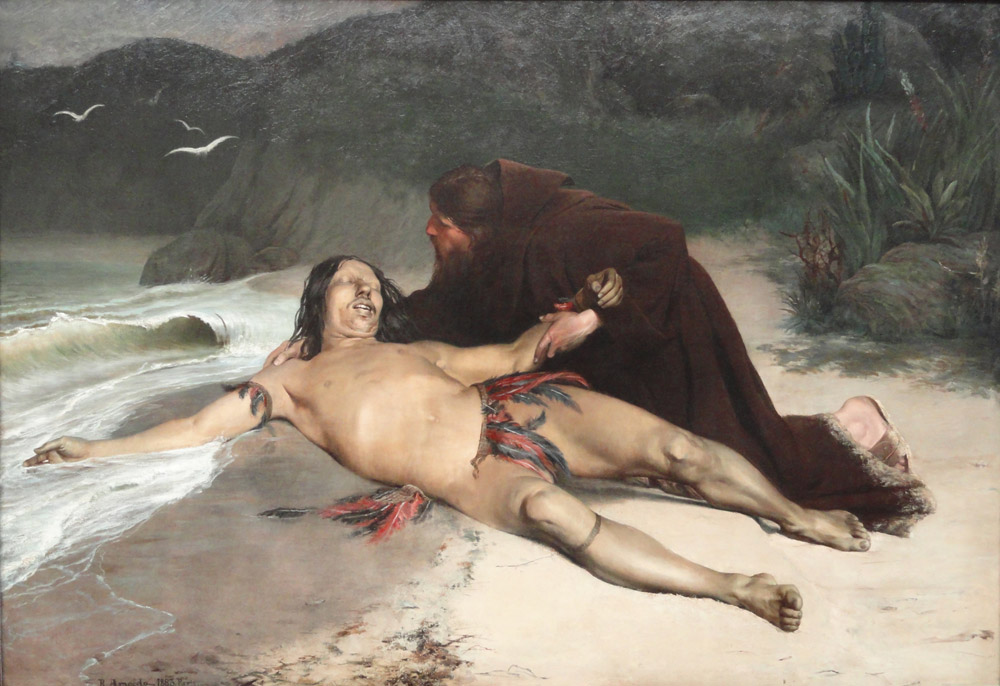
The Last Tamoio (1883)

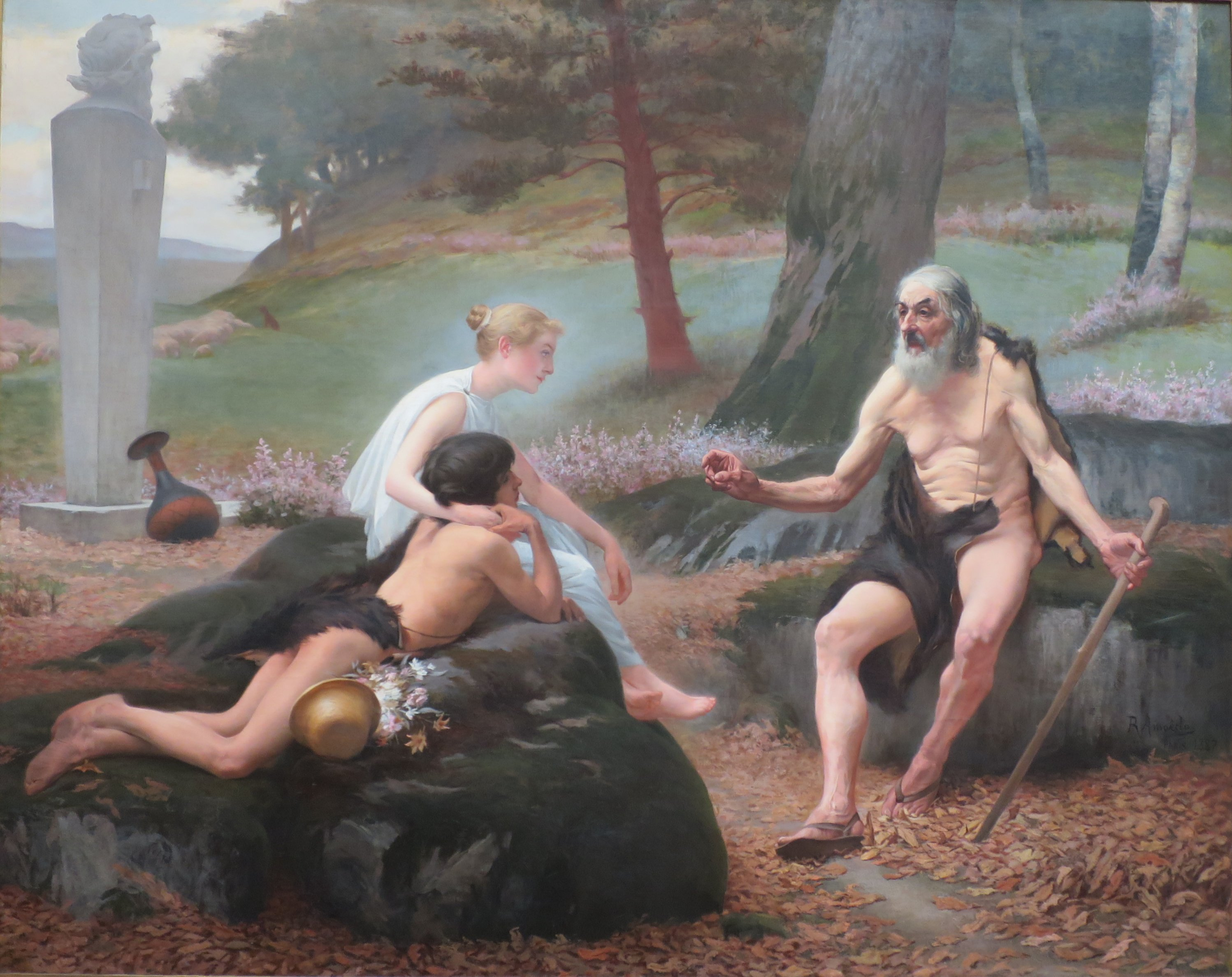
The Narrative of Philitas (1887)

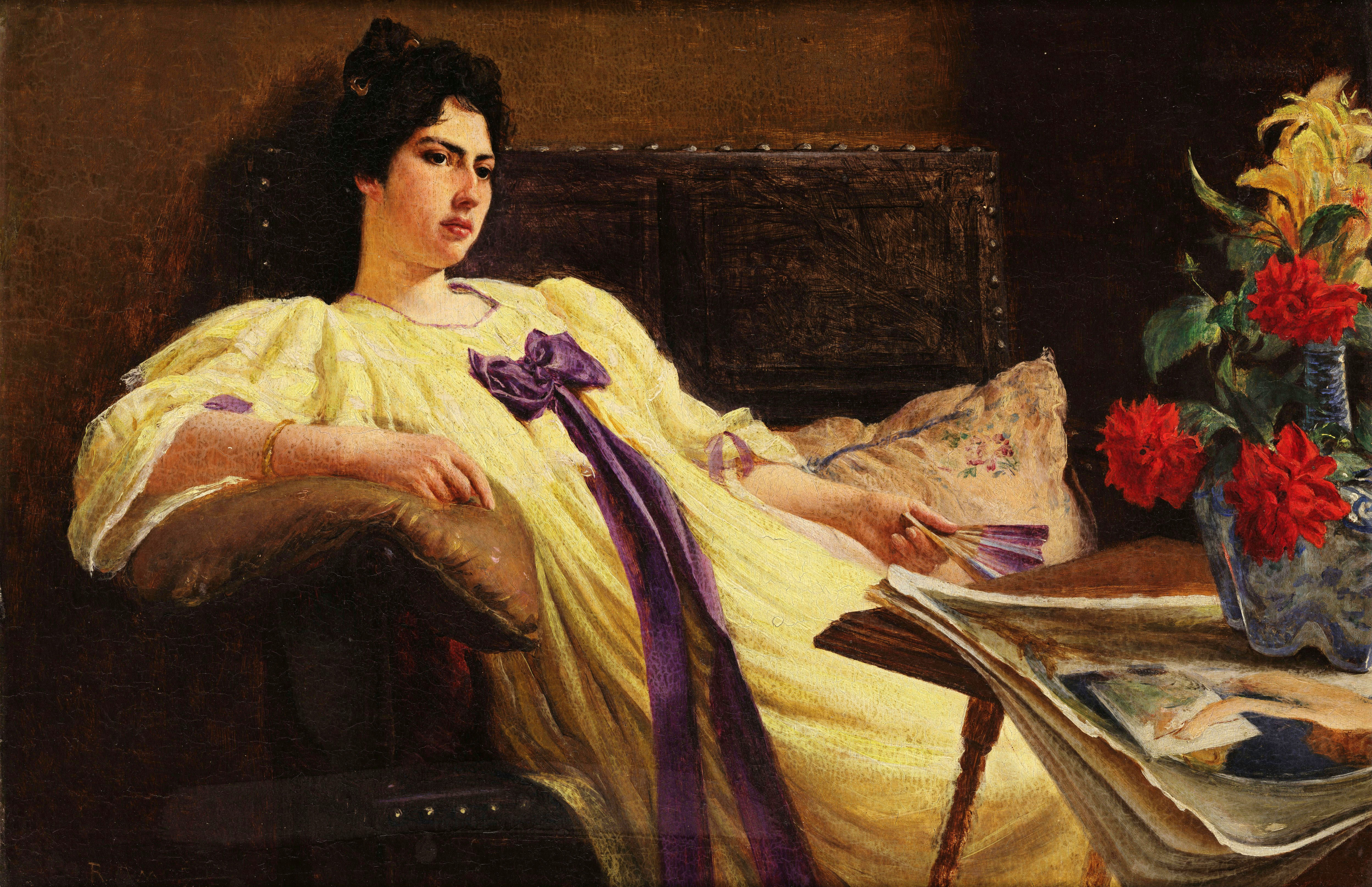
Portrait of a Woman (1892)
