= Eliseu Visconti =

Brazilian painter (1866–1944)

Eliseo Visconti
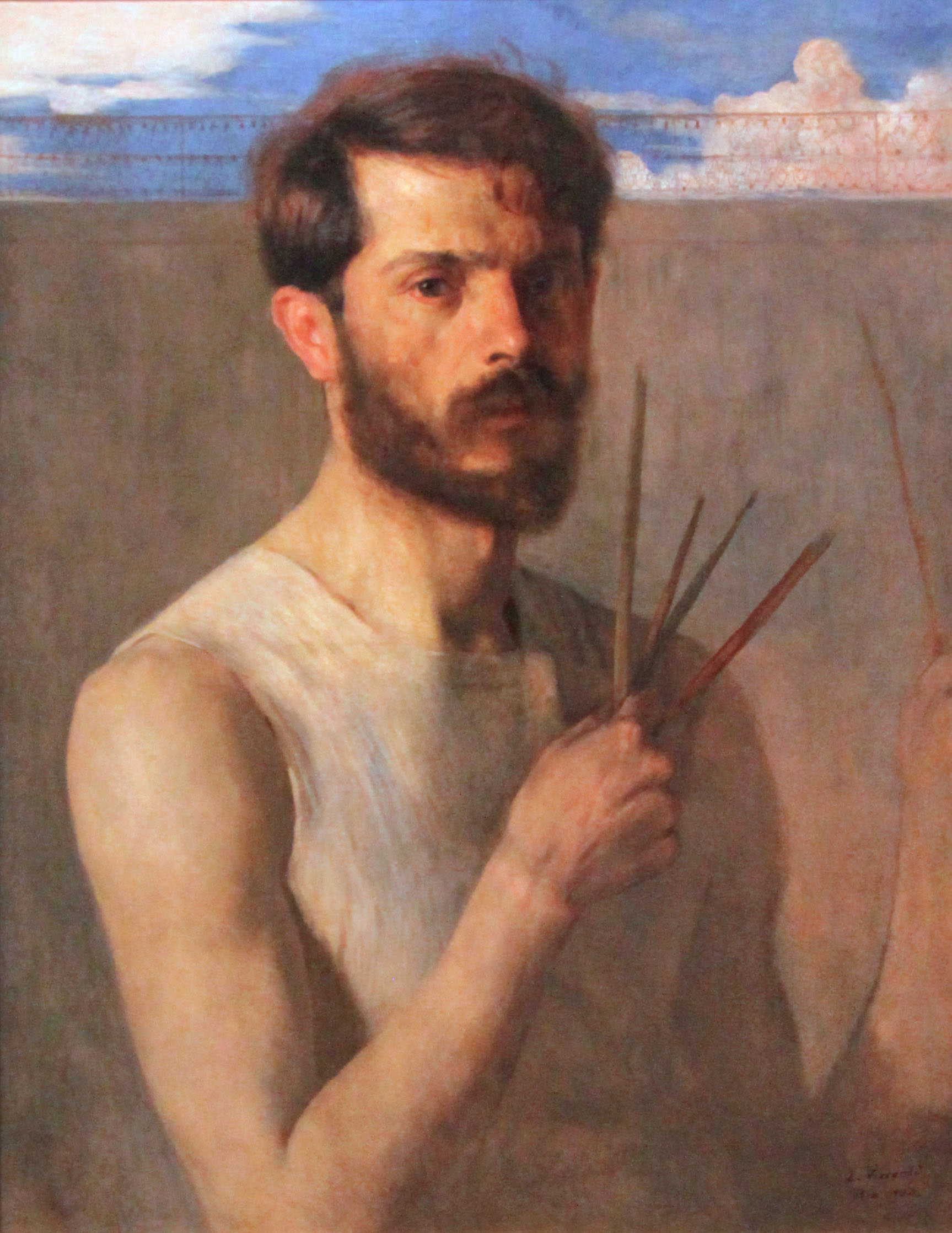
- Self-portrait (1902)
- Born: Eliseo D'Angelo; July 30, 1866; Giffoni Valle Piana, Italy
- Died: October 15, 1944 (aged 78); Rio de Janeiro, Brazil
- Known for: Painting
- Movement: Impressionism, Art Nouveau
- Website: www.eliseuvisconti.com.br

Eliseu Visconti, born Eliseo D'Angelo (30 July 1866 – 15 October 1944), was an Italian-born Brazilian painter, cartoonist, and teacher. He is considered one of the very few Impressionist painters of Brazil. He is considered the initiator of the Art Nouveau in Brazil. He is the Patron of the 11th chair of the Brazilian Academy of Fine Arts.

== Training ==
In 1884 he entered the Liceu de Artes e Ofícios do Rio de Janeiro, where he studied under Victor Meirelles. Parallel to his studies in the Liceu, he entered Brazil's Imperial Academy of Fine Arts, studying under professors Henrique Bernardelli, Rodolfo Amoedo and Jose Maria de Medeiros. In 1888 he received a gold medal at the Academy. Like many of his contemporaries, including some of his teachers, he was involved in the effort to renew the Academy's teaching methods, deemed obsolete and was among the creators of the short-lived "Ateliê Livre", together with professors João Zeferino da Costa, Rodolfo Amoedo, Henrique Bernardelli and Rodolfo Bernardelli.

== Exhibitions ==
Thanks to a prize received in 1892, Visconti travelled to Paris, where he attended the École des Beaux Arts the following year. He also took classes at the Académie Julian and the École nationale supérieure des arts décoratifs, where he was a pupil of Art Nouveau master Eugène Grasset. He was accepted at the Salon of the Société Nationale des Beaux-Arts and at the Salon of the Société des Artistes Français. As one of the Brazilian representatives to the Exposition Universelle 1900 he exhibited the paintings Gioventú and Oréadas, for which he received a silver medal.

Back in Brazil, Visconti exhibited in Rio de Janeiro and São Paulo, and obtained the first place in a contest for the drawing of postal stamps for the Brazilian Casa da Moeda.

He traveled again to Europe, where he exhibited at the Paris Salon of 1905 the portrait of the artist Nicolina Vaz de Assis now at the Museu Nacional de Belas Artes. In this same year, he was invited to paint the stage curtain for the Teatro Municipal of Rio de Janeiro which he completed in his studio in Paris.

== Teaching activities ==
In June 1906, he was selected to replace Henrique Bernardelli as a professor of painting at the Escola Nacional de Belas Artes, the same Imperial Academia renamed after the proclamation of the republic. He accepted the position the following year after returning to Brazil, where he remained a teacher until 1913. Among his disciples were painters Marques Junior and Henrique Cavalleiro.

== Works ==
Decorative schemes executed for the National Library or Biblioteca Nacional in (Rio de Janeiro) date from this period as does another gold medal he received at the International Exhibition of Saint-Louis (Louisiana Purchase Exposition), in 1904, for the painting Recompensa de São Sebastião (see external links). The museum of Santiago of the Chile acquired his Sonho Místico (Mystical Dream) in 1912.

In 1913, Visconti returned to Europe in order to paint large scale panels for the "foyer" of the Theatro Municipal do Rio de Janeiro. His plans to return were interrupted by the First World War so he stayed in France until 1920. The resulting paintings for the "foyer" were sent to Brazil during the war, in 1915.

In 1922 his triptych "Lar" gained him the Medal of Honor in a large exhibition created in Rio de Janeiro to commemorate the first centennial of Brazilian Independence, the Exposição do Centenário. The following year Visconti painted the mural decoration of Rio de Janeiro's municipal council hall. In 1924, he painted the panel depicting the signature of the first Republican Constitution, for the old federal court, also in Rio de Janeiro.

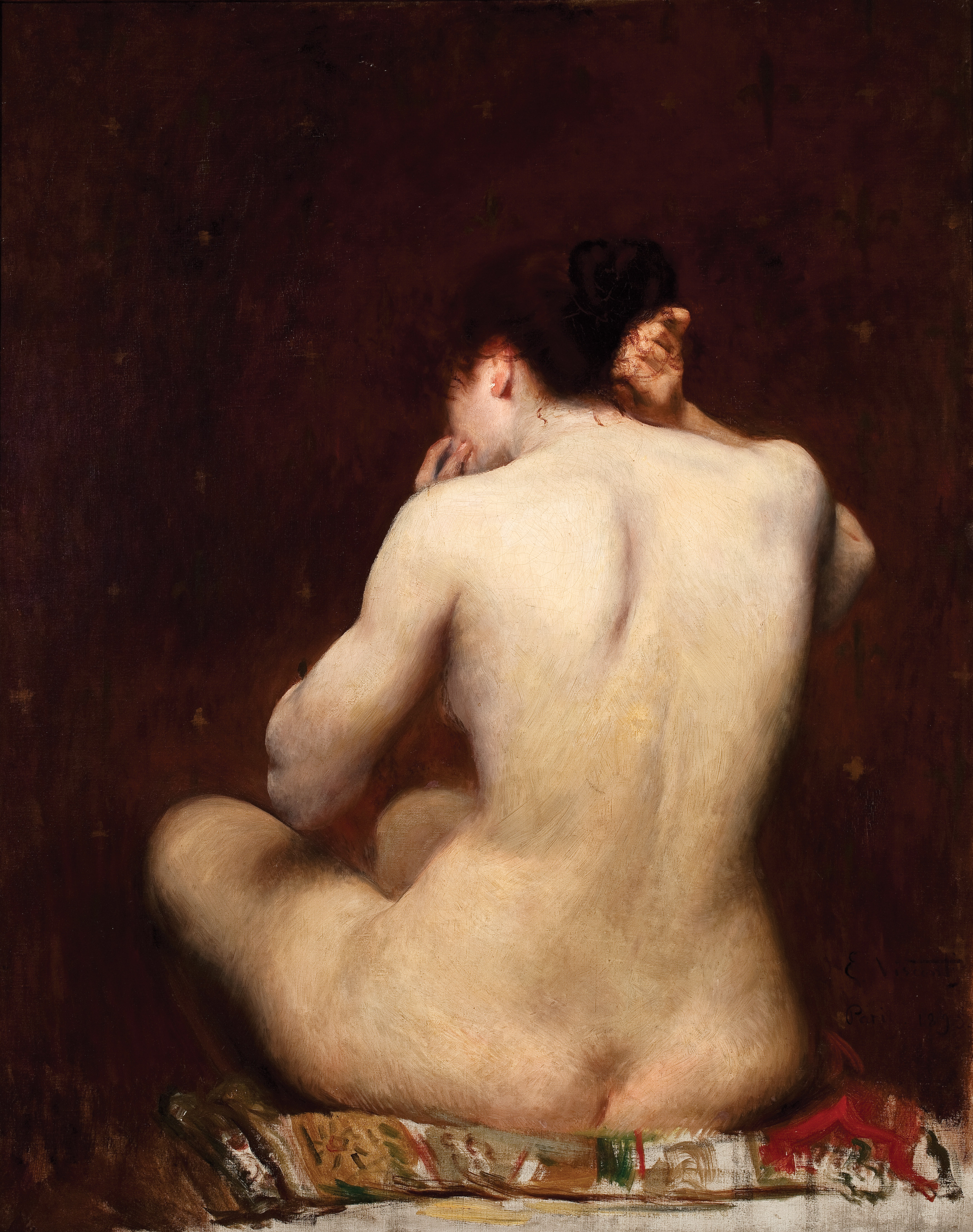
Woman's Back, 1895

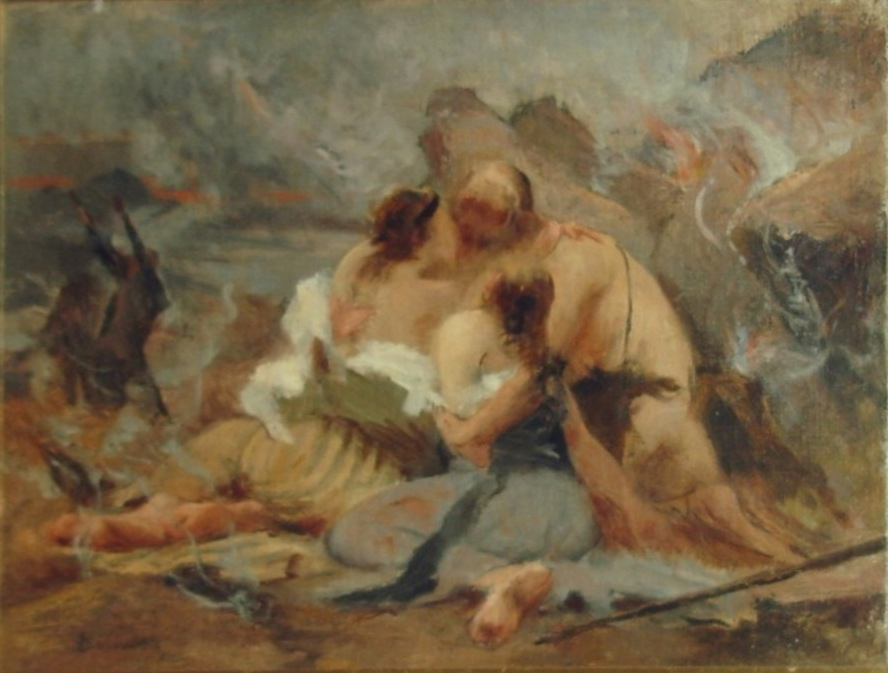
Lot and his Daughters, circa 1913

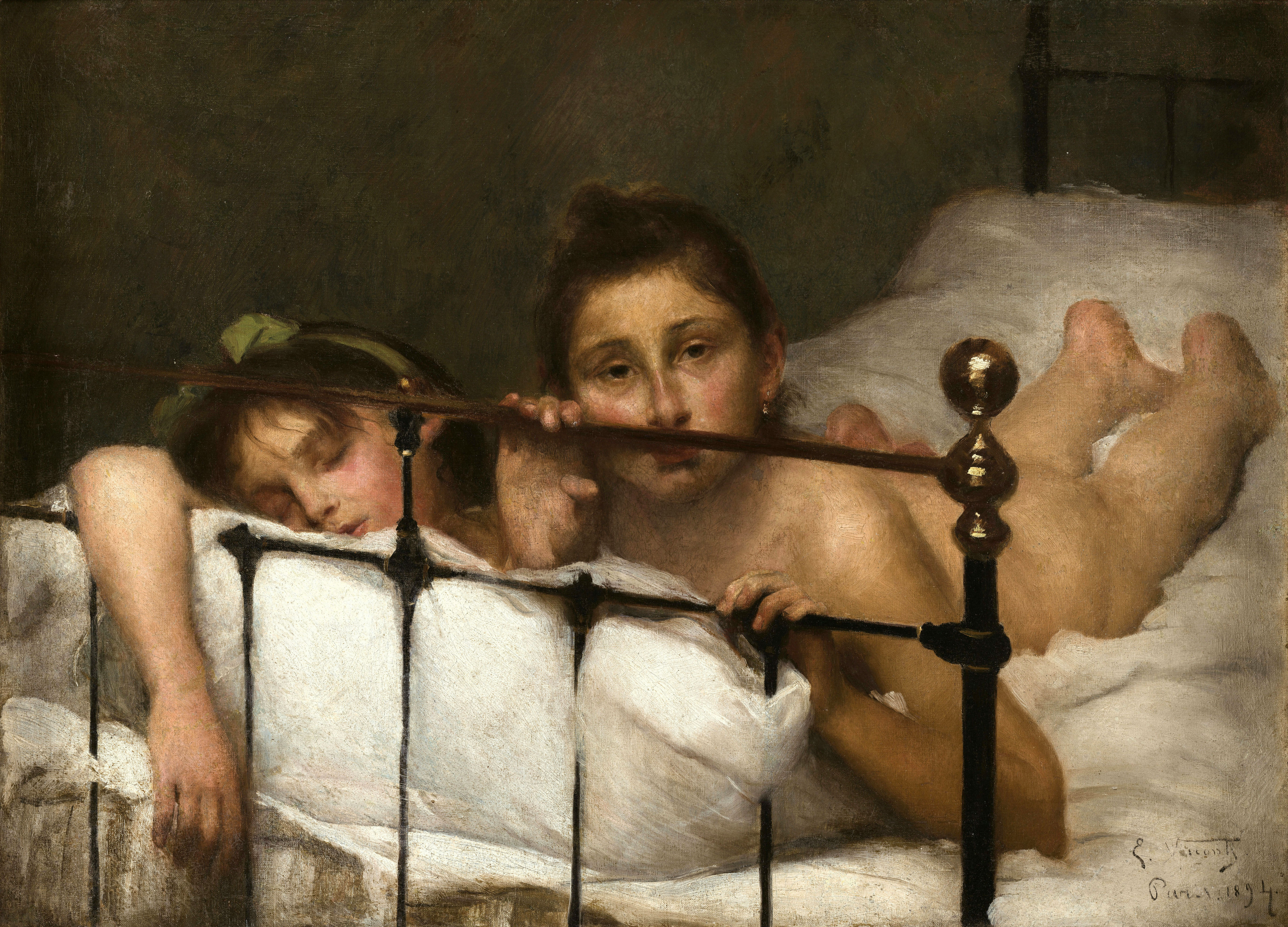
The two sisters, or, In summer, 1894

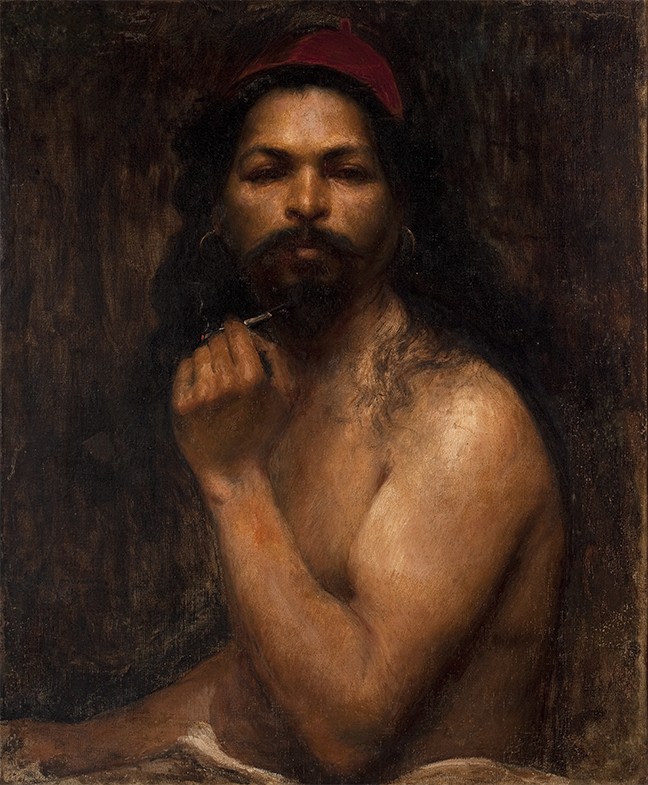
Man with a Red Cap, 1894

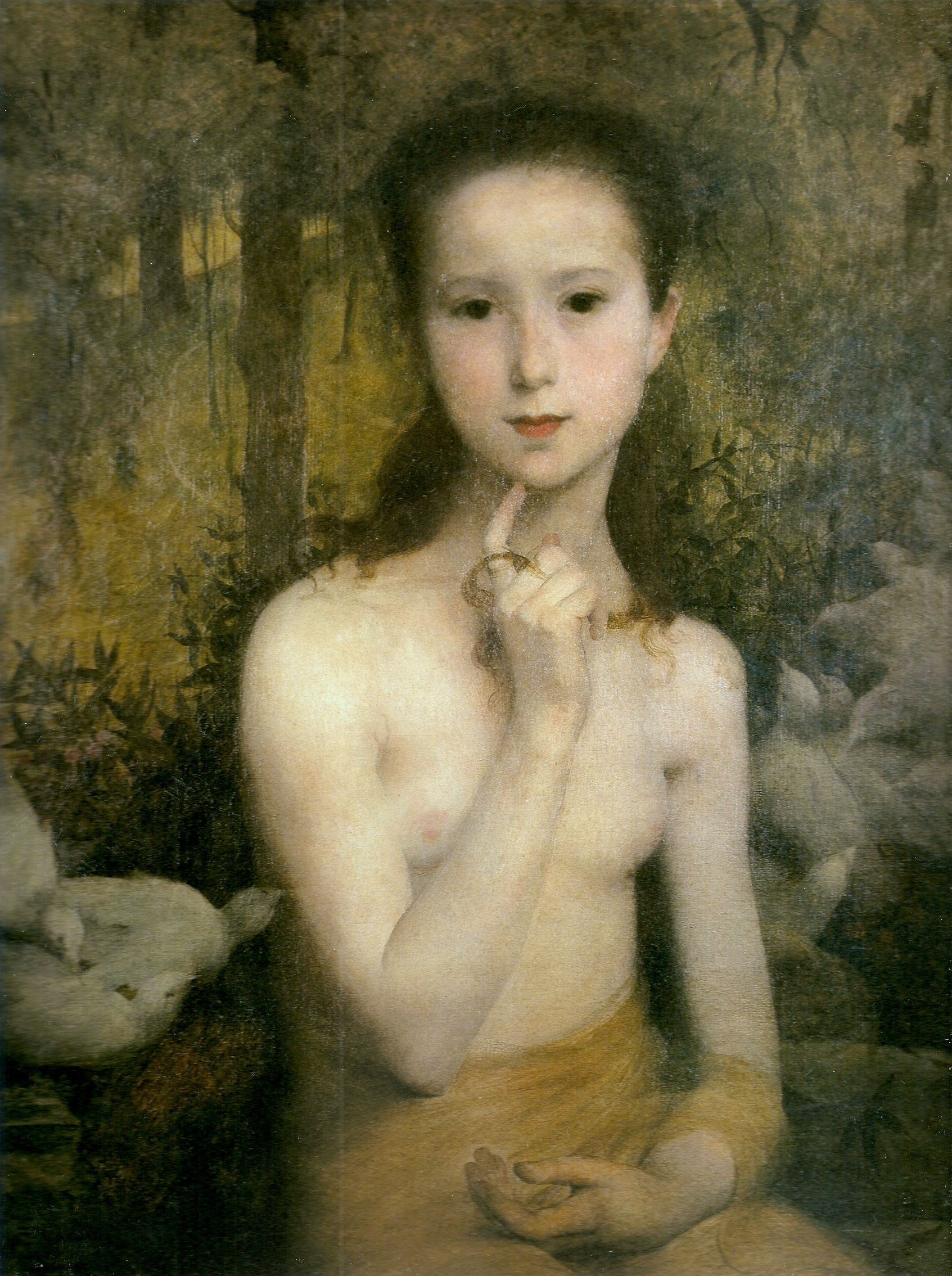
Gioventù, 1898

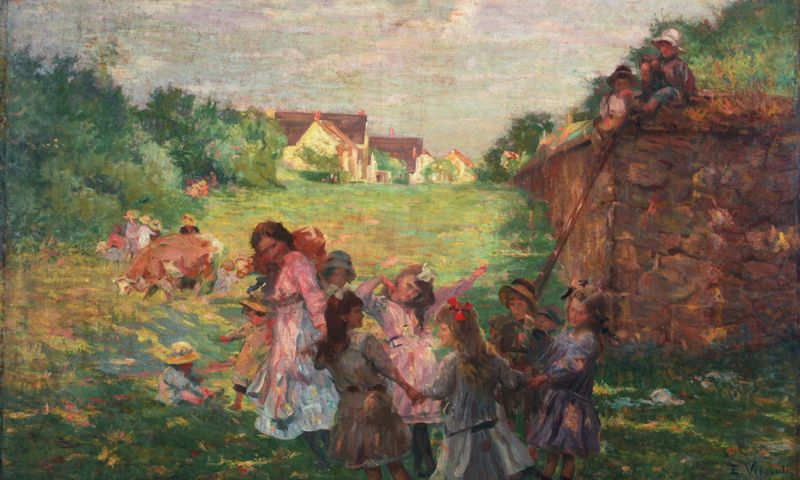
Circle of Children, circa 1918

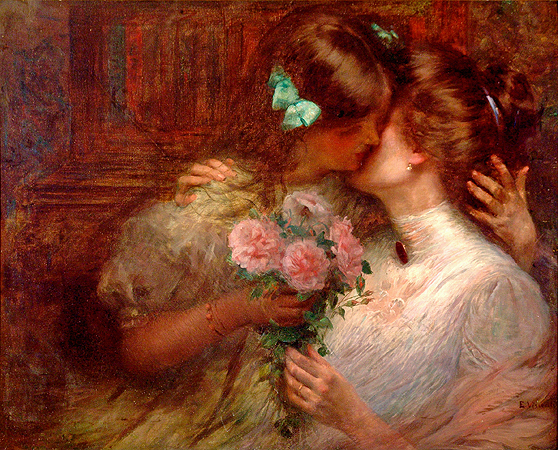
The Kiss, 1910
