= Artur Barrio =

Brazilian artist

- Born: 1945 (age 80–81); Porto, Portugal
- Education: Escola Nacional de Belas Artes (School of Fine Arts) Rio de Janeiro
- Known for: Interactive art, Performance art, Conceptual art, Installation art
- Notable work: Situação T/T1, Belo Horizonte 20 April 1970
- Movement: Modernism
- Awards: Mario Pedrosa Prize, Associação Brazileira de Críticos de Arte for his exhibition Experiencis n° 1 1989; Premio Velázquez de Artes Plásticas 2011

Artur Barrio (Artur Alipio Barrio de Sousa Lopes) is an artist who lives and works in Rio de Janeiro, Brazil. Much of his work consists of installation pieces that create interaction with the public. Barrio engages the viewer as a participant in his art, often without their knowledge that it is art in which they are participating. By doing so, the participant can have an experience not removed from life but rather incorporated into it. He wants to encourage contact with all of reality, including the discards of life such as garbage. He wants us to recognize that this reality is just as real if we can see past the symbolic meanings we attach to these objects. (Manifesto MUD/MEAT SEWER)

== Early life and training ==
Barrio was born in Porto, Portugal, in 1945. In 1952, he spent six months in Angola “where he discovered African culture.” He then moved to Rio de Janeiro, Brazil, in 1955. In 1967, he attended the Escola Nacional de Belas Artes (School of Fine Arts), one of the centers of the Universidade Federal do Rio de Janeiro. His teachers included Onofre Penteado, Abelardo Zaluar, Mário Barata, and Ítalo Campofiorito.

Barrio returned to Portugal during the Portuguese revolution in 1974. In 1975, he moved to Paris, and then, in 1981, to Amsterdam. He had a solo exhibition in the artist initiative Schottenburch, Amsterdam in 1981. Currently, he lives successively in Amsterdam, Aix-en-Provence, and Rio de Janeiro.

== Influences ==
Artur Barrio is an extreme example of the development of art that took place during his early career. It was a time when barriers within art were being tested and pushed to the breaking point. Barrio expressed his understanding of these artistic forces in his work. We can see the imprint of his time on his work in the content, materials and processes he employs in his work. He makes strong anti-art establishment statements, showing a kinship with the Dada artists. He also displays his understanding the Fluxus ideas about flow, process and material usage. These influences combined during the late sixties when counterculture was at its height. His process, his vision and his materials all meld in a form of Situationist art where his pieces become more than installations but also a part of the reality in which they exist.

== Description of style ==
Artur Barrio is seeking to create experience. He uses both ephemeral and precarious materials that provoke an extreme sensorial reaction. Items such as coffee grinds overwhelm the nose, while blood or meat produce a gut reaction. There is a concrete connection to the body and to food. This all generates a reanalysis of the immediate environment and sparks questions about what could have been the cause of these scenes. Artur Barrio changes the normal familiar surroundings and attempts to transport the visitor (participant), possibly through a little discomfort, to a place where everything needs to be more deeply examined.

== Social/political context ==
For much of Artur Barrio's career, Brazil was in the hands of a military dictatorship after the 1964 Brazilian coup d'état.

In 1970 he created Situação…DEFL…+s+…ruas…Abril…(Unleashing confusion on the streets...Situation), consisting of “the placement of five hundred plastic bags containing blood, nails, dung, waste, and other debris in downtown Rio during the peak of the dictatorship’s repression”

At the time of his (Situation T/T1) it was not often for people to disappear. “Autonomous para-police forces (Death Squads) took on the work of 'social cleansing', eliminating delinquents, the marginalized and street children.” His bloody packages were intended to interrogate the status of those that have disappeared and bring into focus the “socially apprehensible possibilities of” governments and other institutions.

== Artistic movements ==
Artur Barrio himself rejects art categories. In his “MANIFEST: against the art categories, against the salons, against the awards, against the jury, against the art critique” (Rio de Janeiro February 1970), Barrio explains his discontent with the top down view of art imposed by an aesthetic elite. In his view, this elite prescribes the materials necessary to create art. These materials were out of reach to Barrio and much of the population of the Third World at the time. His use of inexpensive materials (e.g., garbage, toilet paper, and urine) was a rejection of the aesthetic elite and the art world they controlled, including the definitions of art categories, salons, awards, juried shows, and critics.

Although Barrio rejects art categories, we can see that there are several ideas that he embraces that link him to the Modernist movement. He was highly influenced by the Fluxus ideas, a group that took its name from the concept of “flow”. The idea that you could use whatever you have at hand to make art reflects the idea of anti-commercial art. His work could also be seen as Neo-Dada in its rejection of the prevailing standards in art. He rejects the standard materials of an artist in favor of perishables. He also often rejected typical spaces, preferring to stage his Situations in public places. There are even influences of process art in the way that Barrio would, almost ritualistically, construct his packages (Situation T/T1). Almost all of the works of Artur Barrio are a form of Installation art.

== Interpretation of work ==
Artur Barrio does not see his work as the creation of a finished product. He is an interactive artist; he creates the situation where people interact with and react to artifacts that Barrio has put in place. One of his best known such works, Situação T/T1, (Unfolding of the Body Situation), was titled literally as a situation, not just a stagnant piece of art. In this work Barrio constructed "bloody packages" and tied them loosely. He then strategically placed these "blood-stained rags (trouxas ensanguentadas) in a park to provoke public reactions before police arrived."

Barrio has always pushed the boundaries of what materials can be used in the production of art. He has used a variety of perishable materials like blood, nails, saliva, hair, urine, excrement, bones, toilet paper, tampons, used cotton, film negatives, and other similar items. He defends using such materials with his idea that "expensive materials are being imposed by an aesthetic thought of an elite that thinks from the top to the bottom."

Barrio has no interest in the preservation of his pieces since the art he is interested in is the experience of creating art and the experience of interacting with art. To Barrio, the artifacts that are used to create these experiences are not the art and do not need to be preserved.

== Legacy ==
Artur Barrio has become more accepting of the greater art community. His work (or replicas created as examples of his work) is now exhibited with increasing frequency. However, his attitude is not the main reason that Artur Barrio is now working within the larger established art community. The greater change was not in Artur Barrio but rather in the art word itself. Barrio still “views curators and institutions … as completely superfluous to requirements for works of art and exhibitions. In his eyes curators are reduced to the role of logistics co-ordinators, and, as such, the institution in turn becomes no more than a (temporary) channel for his work.” However, it is because of the work of Artur Barrio and many artists like him that Conceptual art and the use of untraditional media in art has become acceptable.

Barrio now exhibits his work internationally.

== Artworks ==
- Interminável, (Interminable) 2005
- Série transportáveis, (Series you transported) 2003
- Idéia Situação, (Idea Situation) 2002
- Uma Extensâo no Tempo (An Extension in the Time) 1995
- A Cancela de Carne (The Gate of Meat) 1994
- N.....S....F....O....A..... (N.....S....F....O....A.....)
- Minha Cabeça Está Vazia/Meus Olhos Estão Cheios, (My Head Is Empty/My Eyes Are Full) 1983
- Livro de Carne, (Book of Meat) 1978-79 LD Haneuse, photographer©
- Situação T/T1, (Situation T/T1) Belo Horizonte 20 April 1970
- De dentro para fora, (Inside out) 1970

== Exhibits ==
Currículo (Resume), Exposições Individuais (Individual expositions)

- “Actions After Actions,” February 8–March 19, 2006, - Goldie Paley Gallery, The Galleries at Moore, Moore College of Art & Design
- “Barrio-Beuys” 2 July – 11 September 2005, - S.M.A.K. Museum of Contemporary Art Belgium.
- “The Body in Contemporary Brazilian Art” 2005, - Instituto Itaú Cultural, São Paulo.
- Individual: 2005, - Millan gallery Antonio, São Paulo, Brazil.
- Individual: 2005, - Gallery Art 21, - Rio de Janeiro, Brazil.
- "Mini-Retrospective of Artur Barrio" 2005, - Frac the Provence-Alps-Côte d´Azur, Marseille, France.
- Individual: 2005, - Palais de Tokyo, Paris, France.
- "Inverted utopias" 2004, - The Museum of finishes Arts, Houston, U.S.
- "ART AND SOCIETY - an Controversial Relation" 2003, - Itaú Cultural, São Paulo, S.P, Brasil.
- "Violence and Passion" 2002, - Museum of Modern Art of Rio de Janeiro, R.J, Brazil.
- "Violence and Passion" 2002, - Santander Cultural, Porto Alegre, Brasil.
- "Visceral Documents" April 30 to August 24, 2008. Museo Rufino Tamayo, Mexico City.
- "Rodapés de carne" April to Mai 1978, GARAGE 103, Nice, France.

== Exhibition with other Brazilian artists ==
- "Tropicalia - The 60s in Brasilien" 2010, Kunsthalle Wien, Vienna, Austria

== Sources and further reading ==
- Une épopée, un lieu, une revue, des actions, tout un tas d'horizons..., Olivier Garcin, Les Presses du Réel (Dijon, France) & South Art (Nice, France), 2021 (citation, photographies et texte sur l'action menée au Garage 103, Nice)
- The New Your Times, Art review “Walking on Coffee, Trying to Get a Fix on a Master of Impermanence” By Roberta Smith, Published: March 3, 2006
- Ramirez, Mari Carman and Olea, Hector. “Inverted Utopias: avant-garde Art in Latin America” New Haven : Yale University Press; [Houston, Tex.] : Museum of Fine Arts, Houston, c2004. ISBN 0-300-10269-0
- Lopes, Artur Alípio Barrio de Sousa, 1945- “Artur Barrio : Barrio-Beuys.” Gent, Belgie : Stedelijk Museum loor Actuele Kunst, 2005. ISBN 90-75679-22-X
- Havlice, Patricia Pate. “Index to artistic biography” Metuchen, N.J., Scarecrow Press, 1973. ISBN 0-8108-0540-5
- Salgado, Renata. “Imagem escrita / [coordenacao do projeto, Renata Salgado].” Rio de Janeiro, RJ : Grall, 1999 ISBN 85-7038-012-7
- Lopes, Artur Alipio Barrio de Sousa, 1945- “Artur Barrio : Actions after actions” Philadelphia : Goldie Paley Gallery Moore College of Art and Design, c2006. ISBN 1-58442-055-3
- "Espaço aberto / espaço fechado : sites for sculpture in Modern Brazil / [with essays by Stephen Feeke ... [et al.]; texts by artists in the exhibition; additional contributions by Regina Teixeira de Barros; catalog edited by Penelope Curtis and Stephen Feeke]." Leeds : Henry Moore Institute, 2006. ISBN 1-900081-99-7
- Lopes, Artur Alípio Barrio de Sousa, 1945- “Regist(R)os / Artur Barrio” Porto [Portugal] : Fundação de Serralves, 2000 ISBN 972-739-081-1
- Lopes, Artur Alípio Barrio de Sousa, 1945- "Title Artur Barrio / organização, Ligia Canongia; [tradućão, Paulo Andrade Lemos]." Rio de Janeiro : Modo edições, 2002 ISBN 85-89314-01-4
- Lopes, Artur Alípio Barrio de Sousa, 1945- "Artur Barrio : a metáfora dos fluxos 2000/1968" São Paulo : Paço das Artes; Rio de Janeiro : Museu de Arte Moderna; Bahia : Museu de Arte Moderna de Bahia, [2001?]
- Des Viscères et des Abats, Chonique du Garage 103" n°7-8-9 et n°10-48, Nice, France, 1978 & 1981
- "Situacio" Garage 103 edition, 1977, Nice, France.

== English External links ==
- XXIII Bienal Internacional De Sâo Paulo: Artur Barrio
- Case Study Artur Barrio Conservation department - S.M.A.K. Ghentc Case Study Artur Barrio – Interminável 2005
- Philadelphia Exhibitions Initiative: Goldie Paley Gallery, Moore College of Art & Design
- Foreign Exchange Philadelphia 02.15.06 Artforum Article By William Pym Published: February 15, 2006
- Moore College of Art & Design: New Archive: Moore Welcomes International Symposium Feb 25, 2006
- e-flux S.M.A.K. Museum of Contemporary Art Barrio-Beuys 2 July – 11 September 2005
- the-artists.org
- inside installations
- Walking on Coffee, Trying to Get a Fix on a Master of Impermanence New York Times Article By Roberta Smith Published: March 3, 2006

== Portugués External links ==
- ARTUR BARRIO - arturbarrio-trabalhos.blogspot.com
- MUVI Museu Virtual
- Vejinha Online em 27 de novembro de 2002 (com galeria de imagens)
- Artigo do Jornal do Brasil em 14 de novembro de 2002
- Escola de Belas Artes (School of Fine Arts)
