= Solar do Marquês do Lavradio =

Colonial palace in Rio de Janeiro, Brazil

Coordinates: 22.9100°S 43.1833°W

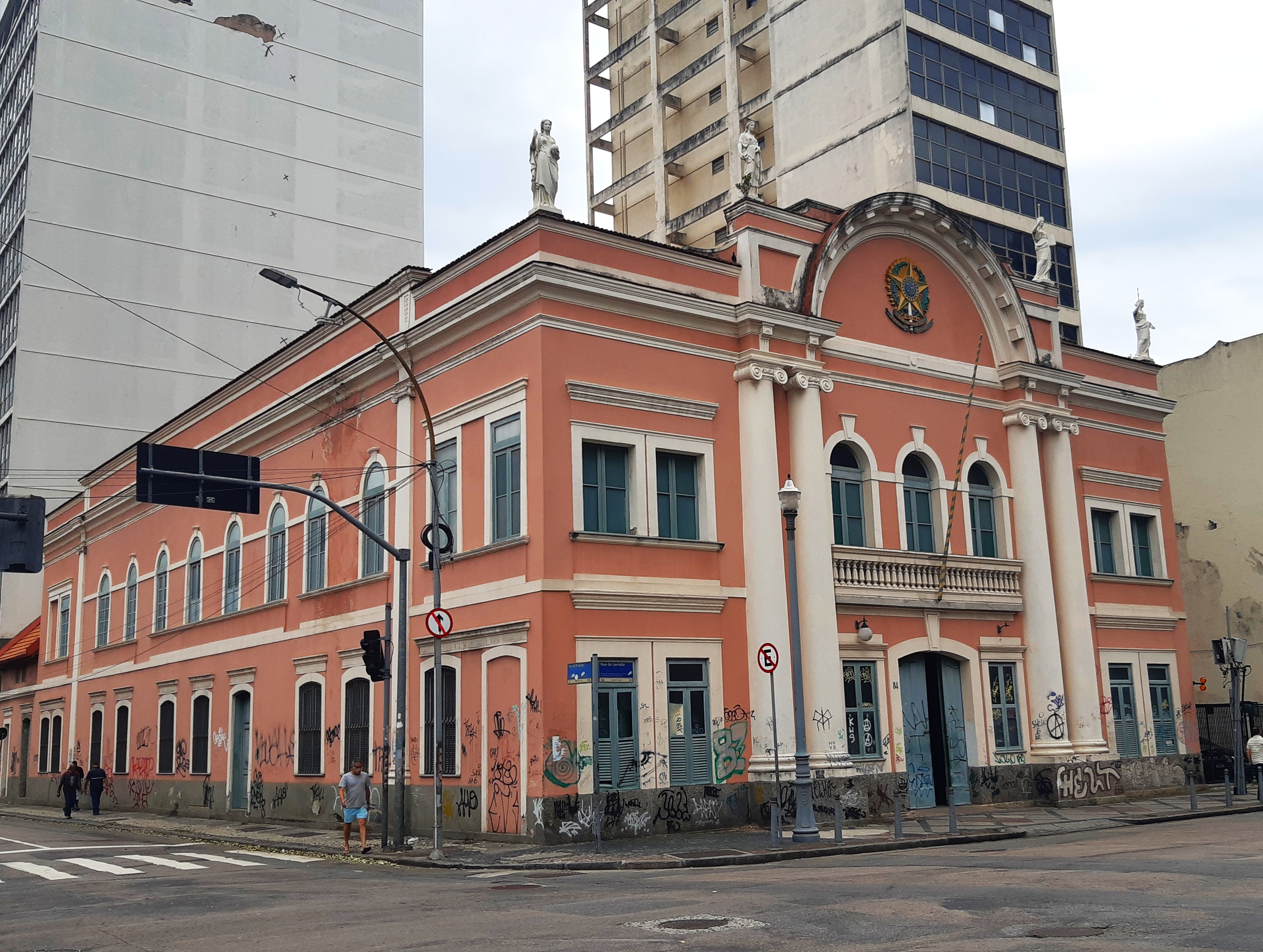
The building photographed in 2022

Solar do Marquês do Lavradio is an 18th-century palace located in Rio de Janeiro, Central Zone, Lapa, Rua do Lavradio, nº 84, built by Luís de Almeida Portugal, 2nd Marquess of Lavradio, a Portuguese nobleman.

In 1967 the historic building was assigned to the Sociedade Brasileira de Belas Artes SBBA (Brazilian Society of Fine Arts).

== History ==
Built in 1777 in colonial style as the residence of the Viceroy of Brazil, the palace was erected during the transfer of the Capital from Salvador, Bahia to Rio de Janeiro. Over the years the palace housed the Tribunal da Relação (1808), the Tribunal do Desembargo, (1812), the Federal Senate (1831) and the Court of Justice (1833). In 1967 the Solar do Marquês do Lavradio was ceded by the State of Rio de Janeiro to the Sociedade Brasileira de Belas Artes SBBA (Brazilian Society of Fine Arts). In 1985 the palace was listed by the State Institute for Cultural Heritage. Renovated between 2010 and 2014, the Solar do Marquês do Lavradio is one of the landmarks of the Central Zone of Rio de Janeiro.

== Bibliography ==
- HILLAL, Therezinha. Renacer da Fhoenix, Nos 105 Anos de Arte Sociedade Brasileira de Belas Artes SBBA, Editora Comunità LTDA, Niterói, RJ, 2015
- INEPAC Sociedade Brasileira de belas Artes.
- FARIA COUTO, André Luiz. Graduação em História pela Universidade Federal Fluminense (UFF).
- RUBENS, Carlos. Pequena História das Artes Plásticas no Brasil. São Paulo: Companhia Editora Nacional, 1941. (pp. 376–378)
