= Arthur Timótheo da Costa =

Brazilian painter and designer (1882–1922)

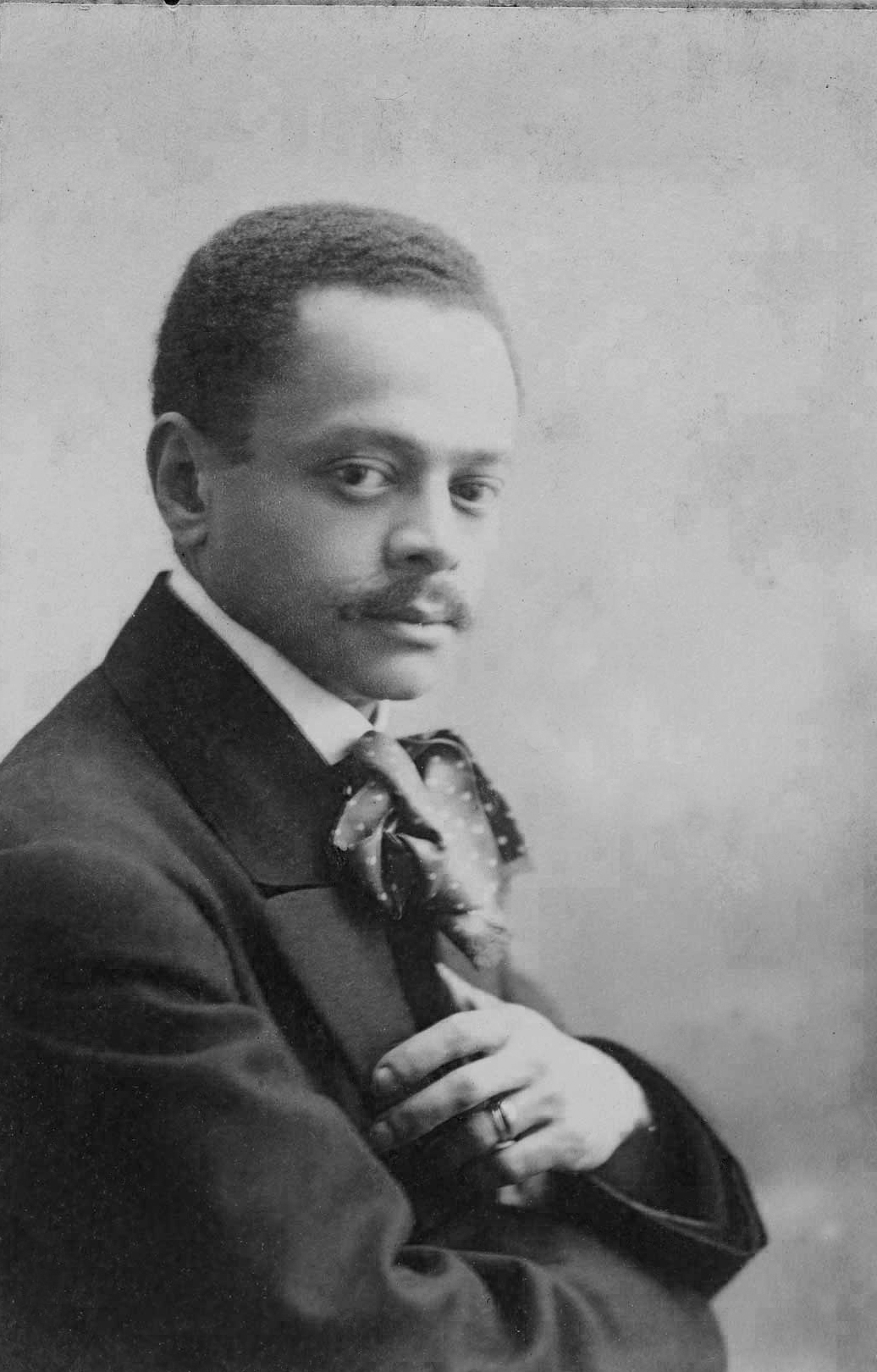
- Arthur Timótheo da Costa (1907)
- Born: 12 November 1882; Rio de Janeiro
- Died: 5 October 1922; Rio de Janeiro
- Occupations: Painter, drawer, scenographer, theatre designer, sculptor

Arthur Timótheo da Costa (12 November 1882 – 5 October 1922) was a Brazilian painter and designer.

== Biography ==
Arthur Timótheo da Costa was born on November 12, 1882. He and his brother João Timóteo da Costa (who also became a well-known painter) began their careers as apprentices at the Brazilian Mint, designing stamps and making prints. At the Mint, da Costa began his studies, taking drawing lessons and familiarizing himself with the technique of Engraving. In 1894, with the permission and patronage of the Director at the Mint, they entered the Escola Nacional de Belas Artes (now part of the Universidade Federal do Rio de Janeiro). He studied under João Zeferino da Costa, Rodolfo Amoedo and Henrique Bernardelli. His early artistic development was further nurtured by Italian set designer Oreste Coliva. Between 1895 and 1900, da Costa informally studied scenography under Coliva, and also worked as his assistant.

Da Costa participated in multiple editions of the "Exposição Gerais de Belas Artes", an annual art exhibition hosted by the Escola de Belas Artes. In 1907, he entered the exhibition and won a trip to Europe, spending some time in Paris. This was the same year his painting "Antes do Aleluia" garnered critical acclaim. The following year, he travelled to Paris where he stayed for 2 years to study.

Together with his brother João and another duo of brother artists, Carlos Chambelland and Rodolfo Chambelland, he participated in decorating the Brazilian pavilion at the Turin International exposition of 1911.

From 1910 onwards, after his return to Brazil, Arthur was a very prolific artist, establishing himself as a renowned painter. In 1919, in Rio de Janeiro, together with a group of fellow artists, he founded the group " la Juventas". That same year, he and his brother decorated the main hall of Fluminese Football Club. In 1921, he participated in the "Exposição Gerais de Belas Artes" for the last time.

In the early 1920s, he began to show signs of mental illness and rapidly deteriorated to the point where he was unable to care for himself. He was committed to the Hospício Pedro II and died there on October 5, 1922.

== Selected paintings ==
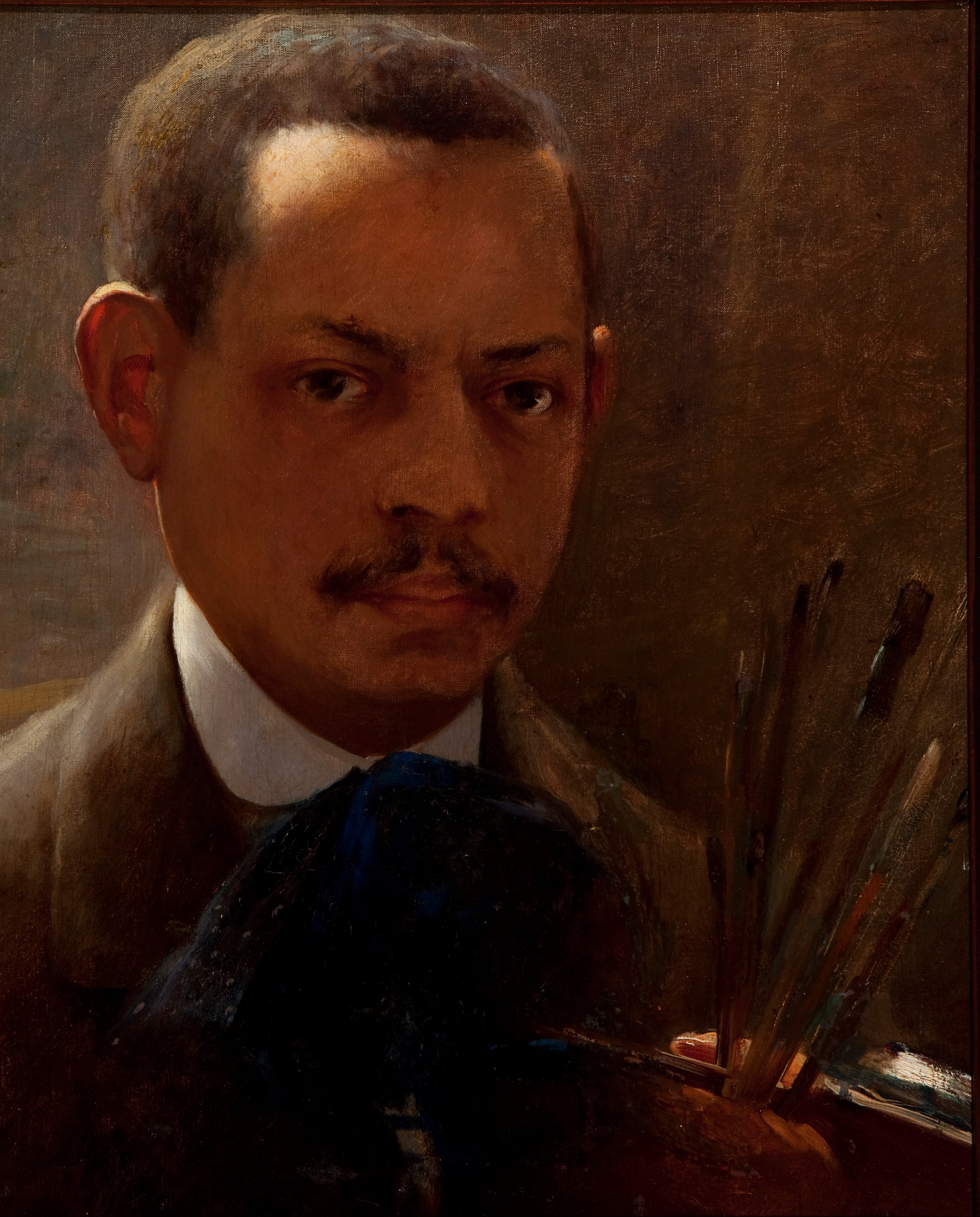
Self-portrait, 1908

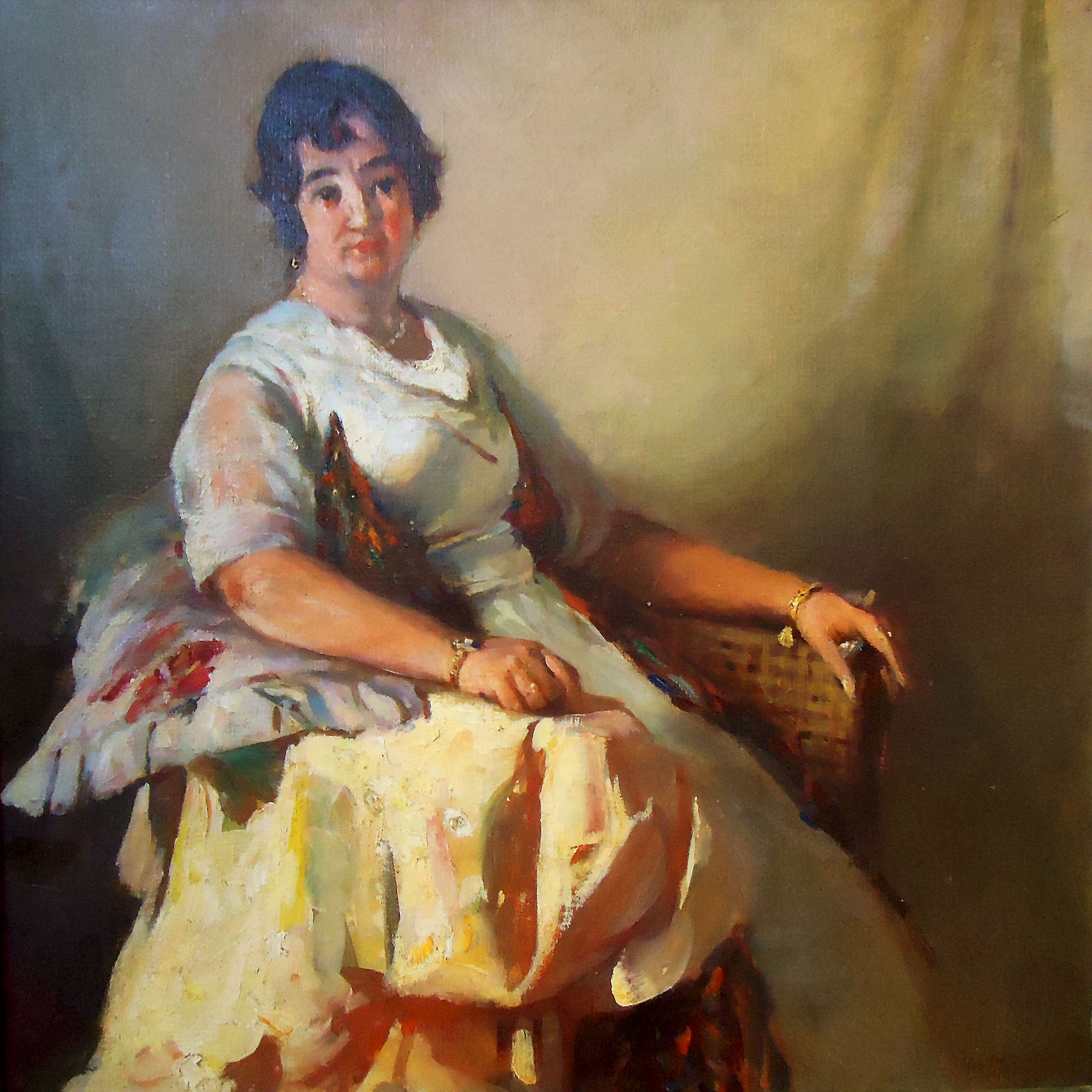
Portrait of a Lady
(date unknown)

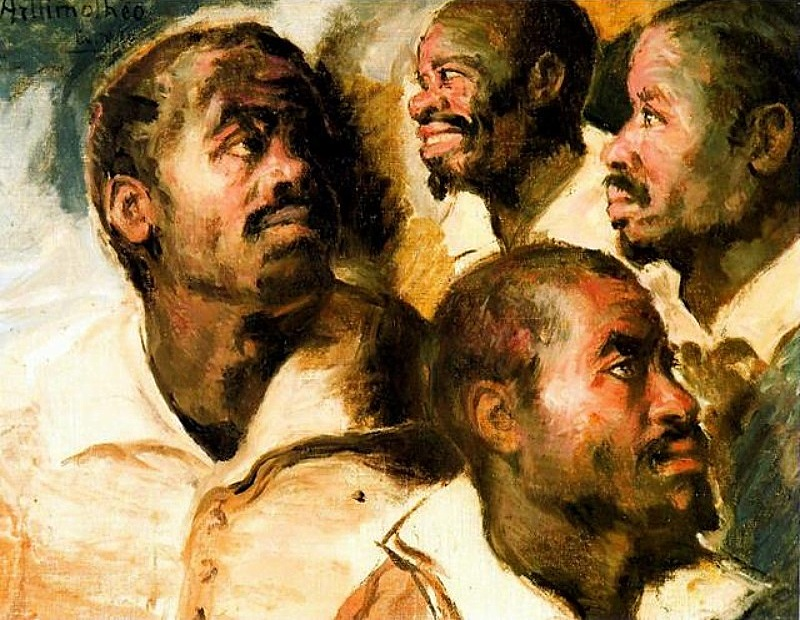
A Study of Heads
(date unknown)

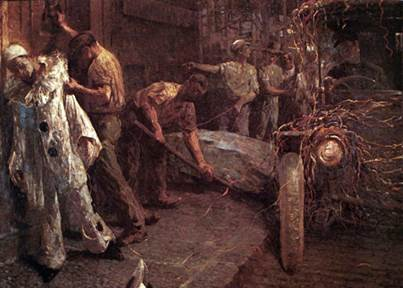
The Day After Carnival (1913)

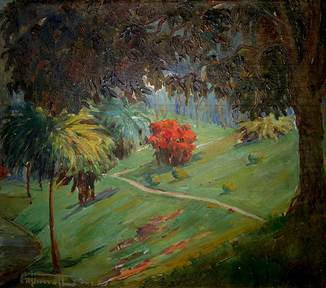
Landscape with Large Tree and Red Bush (1914)

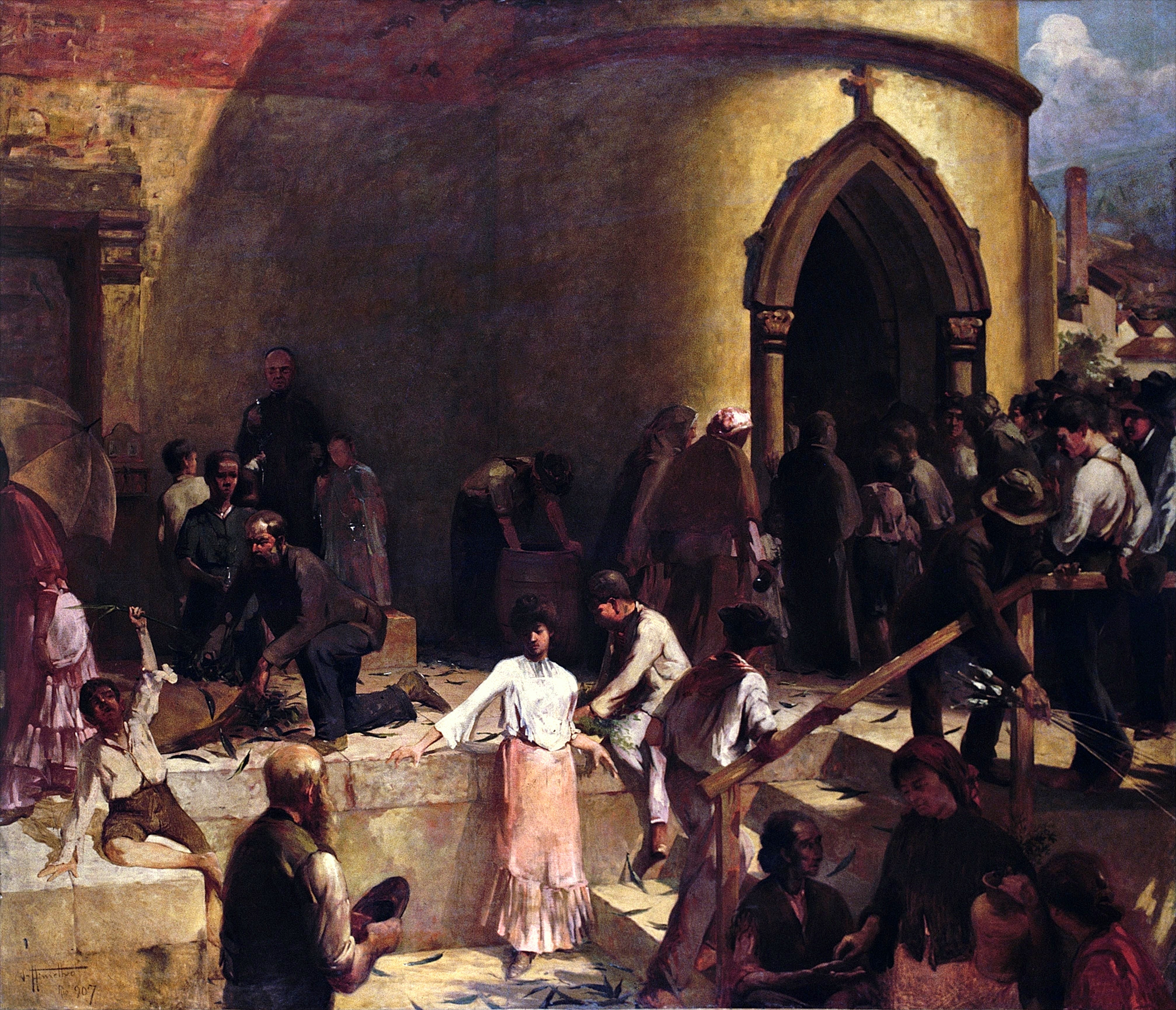
Antes do Aleluia, 1907, at the Museu Nacional de Belas Artes in Rio de Janeiro
