= Gioventù =

1898 painting by Eliseu Visconti

Gioventú
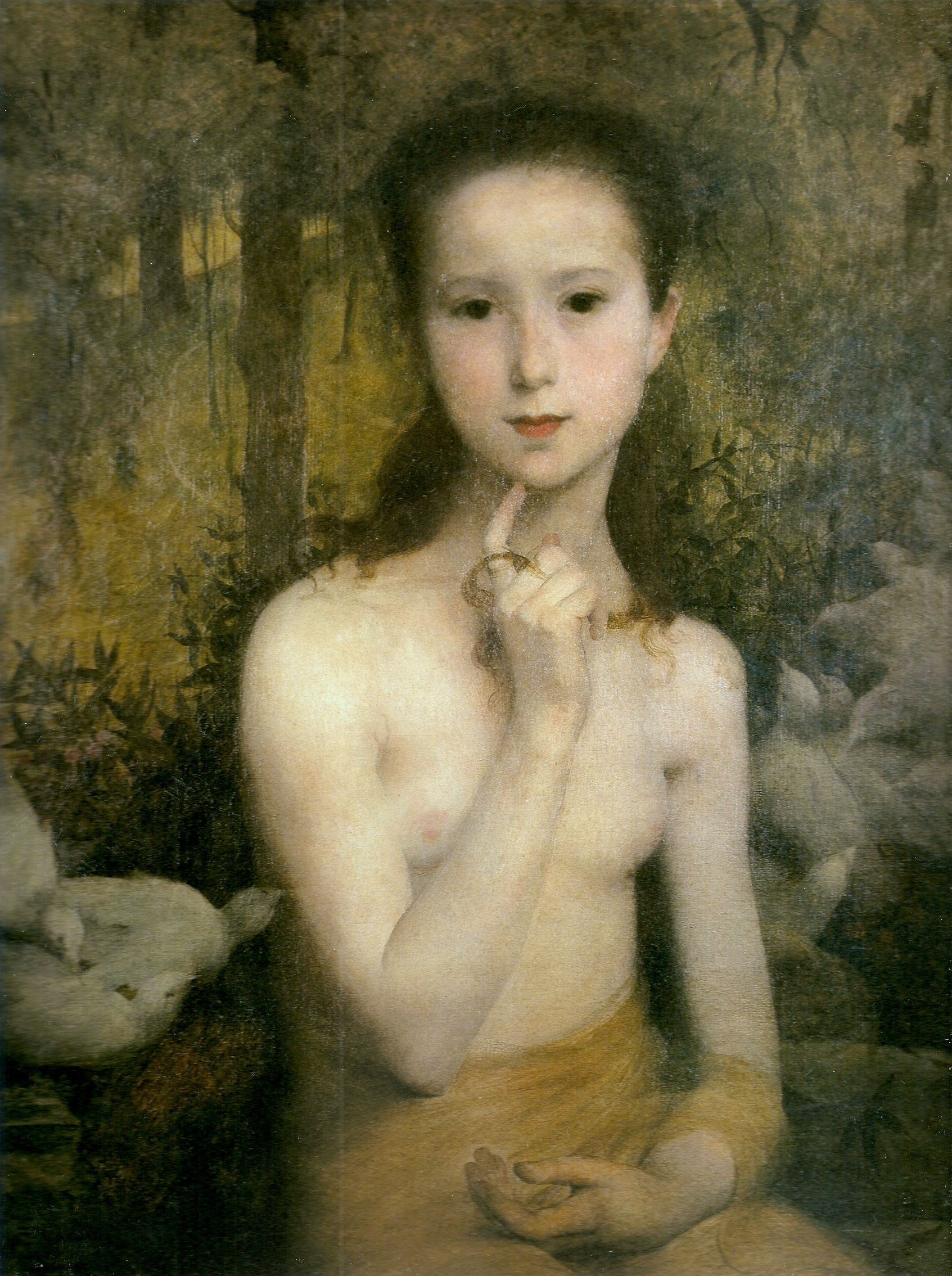
- Artist: Eliseu Visconti
- Year: 1898
- Medium: oil on canvas
- Dimensions: 65 cm × 49 cm (26 in × 19 in)
- Location: Museu Nacional de Belas Artes (MNBA), Rio de Janeiro

Gioventù (Youth in Italian) is a painting by the Brazilian painter and designer Eliseu Visconti, from 1898.

Visconti was educated in Paris and influenced by Impressionism, Art Nouveau and Symbolism. His work was to some extent a modern interpretation of these tendencies he got acquainted to in Paris.

Visconti drew Gioventù in Paris in 1898. This artwork was painted in oil on a canvas; it measures 65 x 49 cm and is on display at the Rio de Janeiro National Museum of Art.

The work was first exhibited at the Salon de la Societe Nationale des Beaux-Arts, Paris, in 1899, under the title Melancolie. Still with that title, it conquered the silver medal in the Exposition Universelle of 1900, in Paris.

== A hidden painting ==
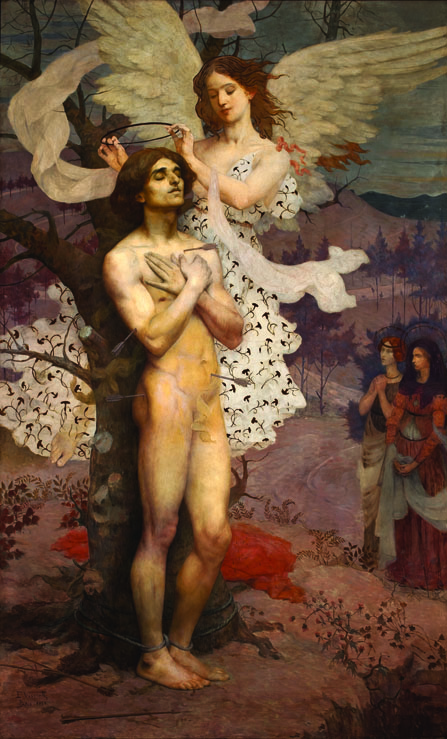
Recompensa de São Sebastião – 1898

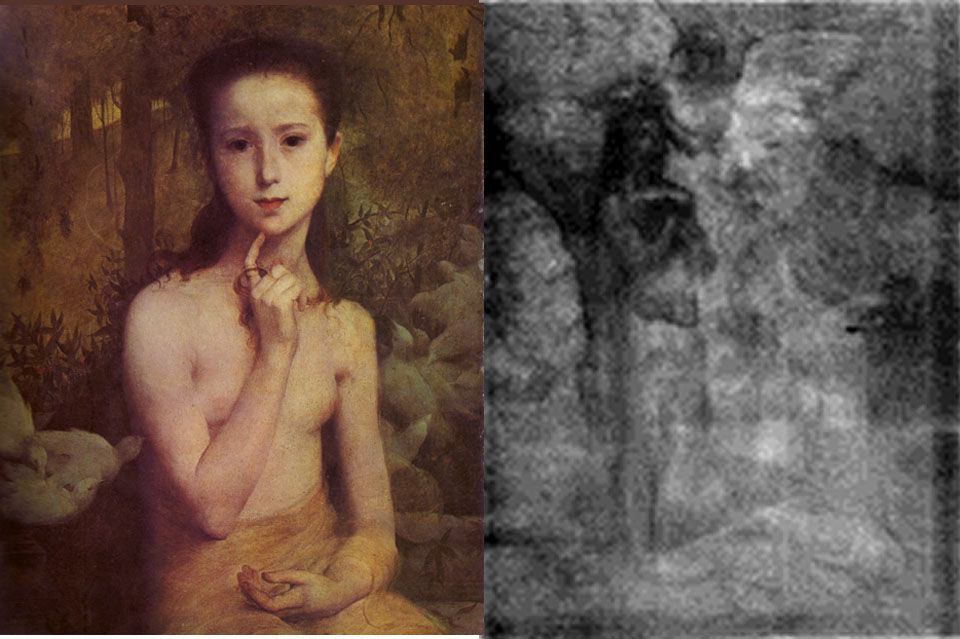
Gioventù and the study for Recompensa de São Sebastião, discovered under painting.

A portable device, which works by X-ray fluorescence, allowed for an important revelation after being used in the Gioventú frame. Concealed under the young woman portrayed, a study was found for another screen by Visconti entitled Recompensa de São Sebastião (Reward of Saint Sebastian). The equipment that allowed this intriguing discovery was developed by the Brazilian researcher Cristiane Calza, during her doctorate, completed in 2007 at the Federal University of Rio de Janeiro. The system is able to identify the time when a painting was painted, the composition of colors used by the artist, the existence of later touches and even falsifications.

Recompensa de São Sebastião, as well as Gioventù, was awarded an international exhibition, receiving the gold medal at the Universal Exposition at Saint Louis, in the United States, in 1904. In X-ray images, the angel crowning laurels the San Sebastian tied to a tree appears even more clearly than the girl of Gioventù. The painter seems to have changed his mind after the study because, instead of laurels, in the finished picture the angel puts a halo on the saint's head.
