= João Zeferino da Costa =

Brazilian painter and designer

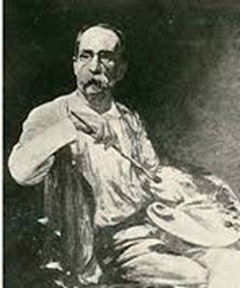
- Born: August 25, 1840; Rio de Janeiro
- Died: August 24, 1915 (aged 74); Rio de Janeiro
- Education: Imperial Academy of Fine Arts; Accademia di San Luca

João Zeferino da Costa (August 25, 1840 – August 24, 1915) was a Brazilian painter and designer. He is the Patron of the 24th chair of the Brazilian Academy of Fine Arts.

== Life and work ==
He began his studies in 1857 at the Academia Imperial de Belas Artes (AIBA) under the direction of Victor Meirelles. While there, he won several awards and was granted a fellowship to study in Europe. In 1869, he went to Rome and enrolled at the Accademia di San Luca, becoming a student of Cesare Mariani. He studied there for three years, winning several more awards, which allowed him to extend his visit for a few more years. Some of his best-known paintings were done during this period.

When he returned to Brazil in 1877, he temporarily replaced Meirelles as the Professor of history painting at AIBA; although his primary position was as a teacher of landscapes, nude figure painting and design at the Escola Nacional de Belas Artes (ENBA). Among his best-known students there were Rodolfo Amoedo, Henrique Bernardelli, Lucílio de Albuquerque and Giovanni Battista Castagneto.

In 1880, Emperor Pedro II (who was impressed by Costa's Italian education) commissioned him to paint murals in Candelária Church which, after a brief trip to Rome for inspiration, were done in collaboration with his students. His rendering of the Virgin Mary surrounded by the Seven Virtues is considered to be his masterpiece. Later, his works at the General Exhibition of Fine Arts were heavily criticized by Gonzaga Duque, Brazil's first art historian. As a result, he never exhibited publicly again.

In 1890, he became a deputy director at ENBA. Two years before his death, he was called upon to help restore his murals (already in poor condition after only thirty years), but his hands were so badly twisted by rheumatism that other painters had to be employed to do the work.

He wrote a book, Mecanismos e proporções da figura humana (Mechanisms and Proportions of the Human Figure), which was published the year after his death and presents the essence of his artistic credo.

== Selected paintings ==
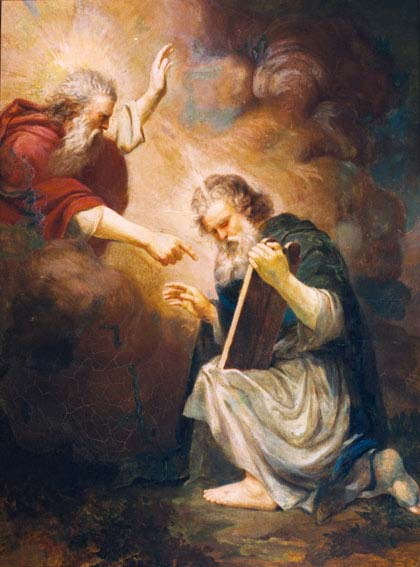
Moses Receiving the Law (1868)

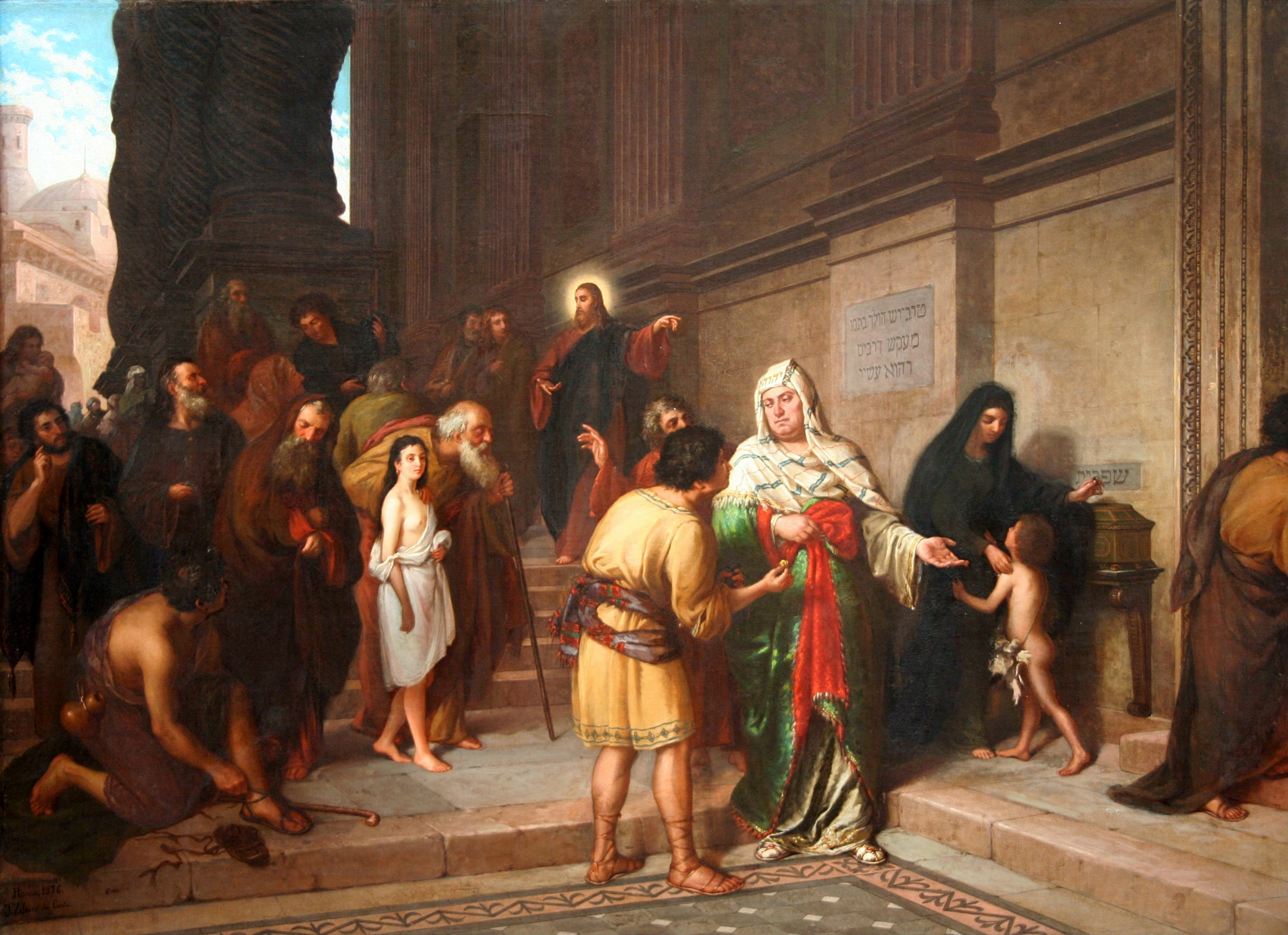
Lesson of the Widow's Mite (1876)

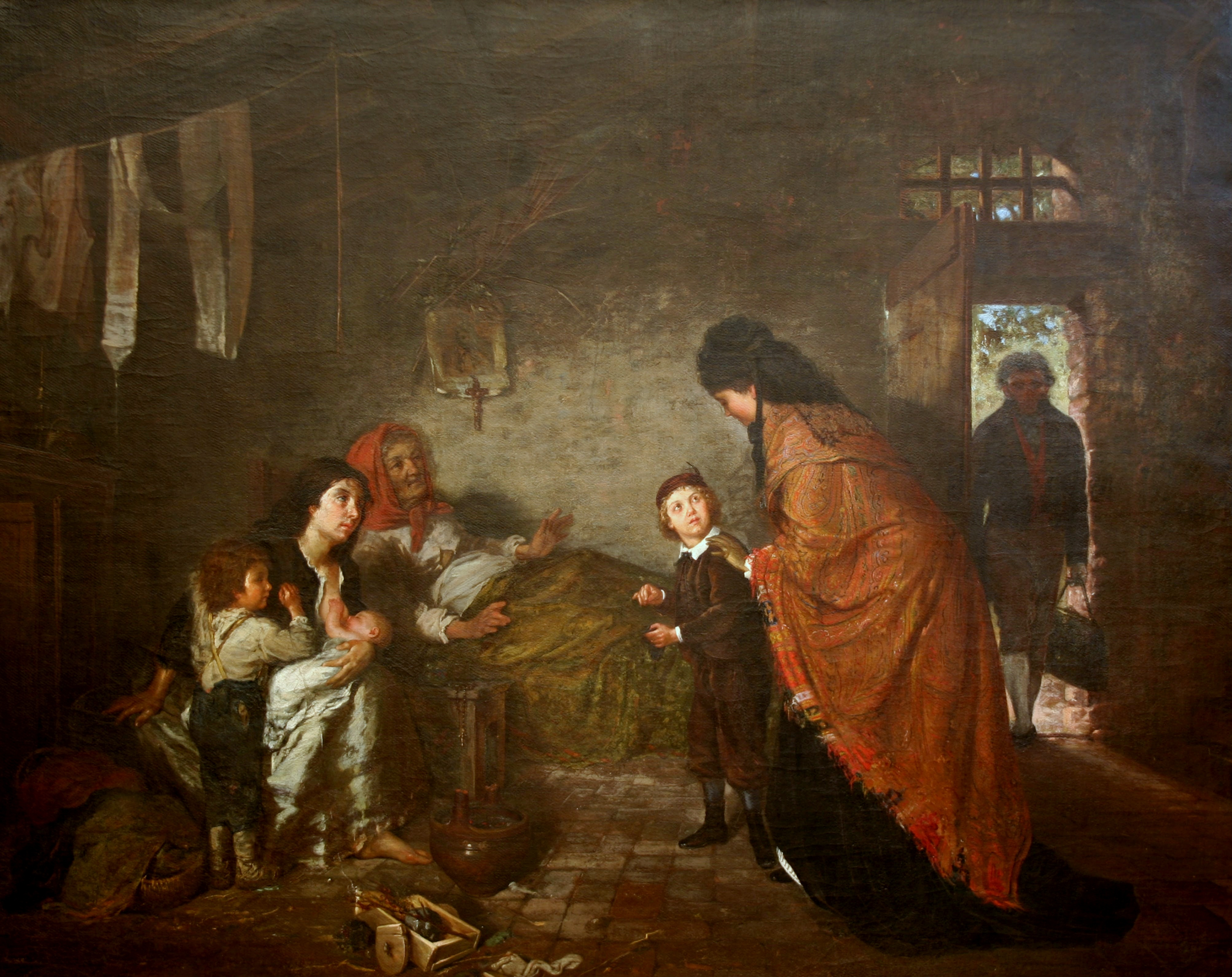
Charity (1872)

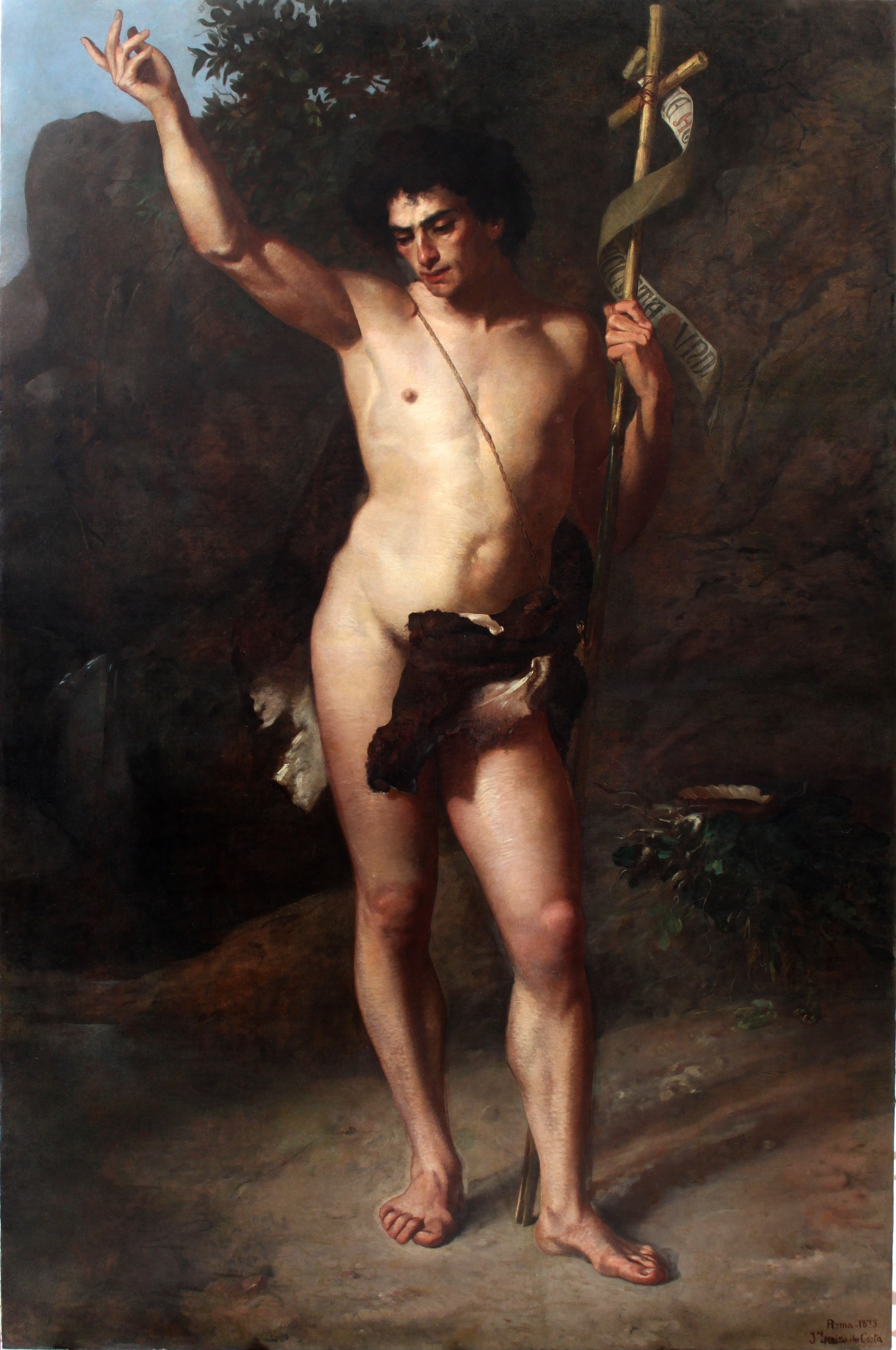
Saint John the Baptist (1873)
