= Escola Nacional de Belas Artes =

School in Rio de Janeiro, Brazil

Coordinates: 22°51′45″S 43°13′32″W

Escola de Belas Artes
- Former names: Royal School of Sciences, Arts and Crafts; Imperial Academy of the Fine Arts
- Type: Fine arts
- Established: 1891; 135 years ago
- Parent institution: Federal University of Rio de Janeiro
- Dean: Roberto de Andrade Medronho
- Director: Madalena Ribeiro Grimaldi
- Location: Rio de Janeiro, Rio de Janeiro, Brazil
- Website: www.eba.ufrj.br
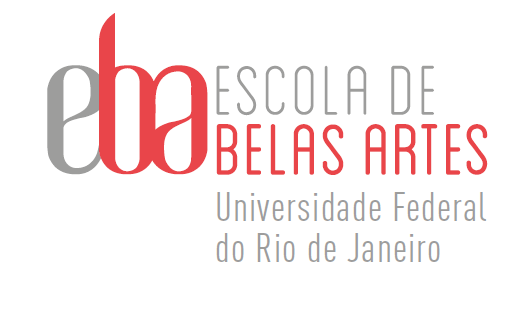

The School of Fine Arts (Brazilian Portuguese: Escola de Belas Artes) is one of the centers of the Federal University of Rio de Janeiro and dates back to colonial times.

A royal letter of 20 November 1800 by John VI of Portugal established the Aula Prática de Desenho e Figura in Rio de Janeiro. It was the first institution in Brazil systematically dedicated to teaching the arts. During colonial times, the arts were mainly of religious or utilitarian nature and were learnt in a system of apprenticeship.

The Decree of 12 August 1816 created the Escola Real de Ciências, Artes e Ofícios (Royal School of Sciences, Arts and Crafts), which established an official education in the fine arts. Then it was renamed as the Academia Imperial de Belas Artes (Imperial Academy of Fine Arts), instituting a system of artistic education that would greatly influence the development of Brazilian art.

On 8 November 1890, the old Imperial Academy was transformed into the National School of Fine Arts (Brazilian Portuguese: Escola Nacional de Belas Artes). In 1931, the School joined the University of Rio de Janeiro, the current Federal University of Rio de Janeiro.

== Notable alumni ==
- Affonso Eduardo Reidy (1909–1964), architect
- Anna Maria Maiolino (1942–), Italian plastic artist
- Artur Barrio (1945–), conceptual artist
- Arthur Timótheo da Costa (1882–1922), Afro-Brazilian painter
- Burle Marx (1909–1994), landscape architect
- Candido Portinari (1903–1962), painter
- Franz Weissmann (1911–2005), Austrian sculptor
- Ismael Nery (1900–1934), poet and painter
- Lúcio Costa (1902–1998), Brazilian architect and urban planner
- Lygia Pape (1927–2004), sculpture, engraving, and filmmaking
- Oscar Niemeyer (1907–2012), architect
- Oswaldo Goeldi (1895–1961), artist and engraver
- Rubens Gerchman (1942–2008), painter and sculptor
- Victor Meirelles (1832–1903), painter
