= List of international presidential trips made by Dilma Rousseff =

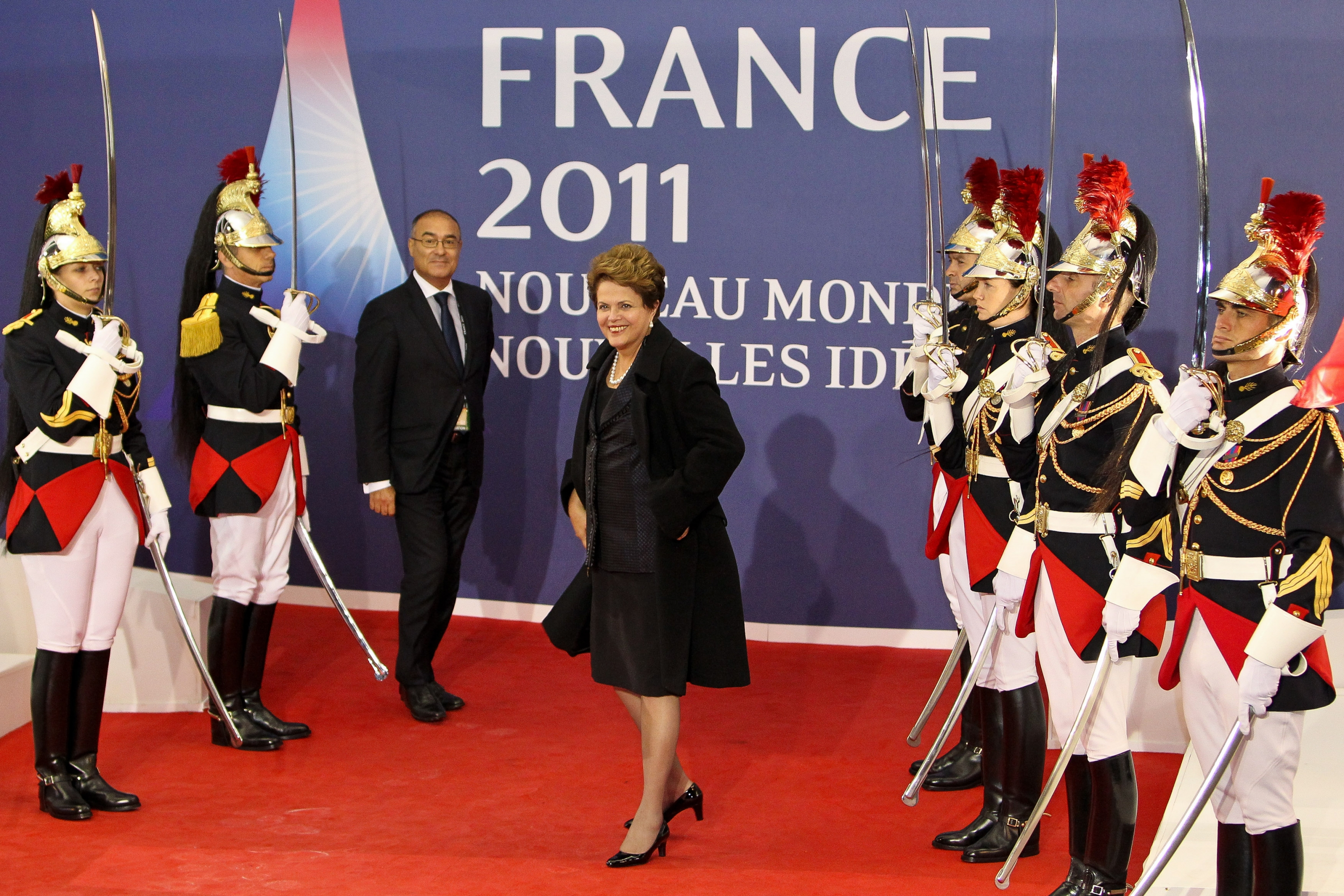
President Rousseff arrives at the G-20 summit in Cannes, France, on 3 November 2011.

This is a list of international presidential trips made by Dilma Rousseff, the 36th President of Brazil. During her presidency, which began with her inauguration on 1 January 2011 and ended with her impeachment on 31 August 2016, Rousseff visited a total of 29 countries.

== Summary of international trips ==
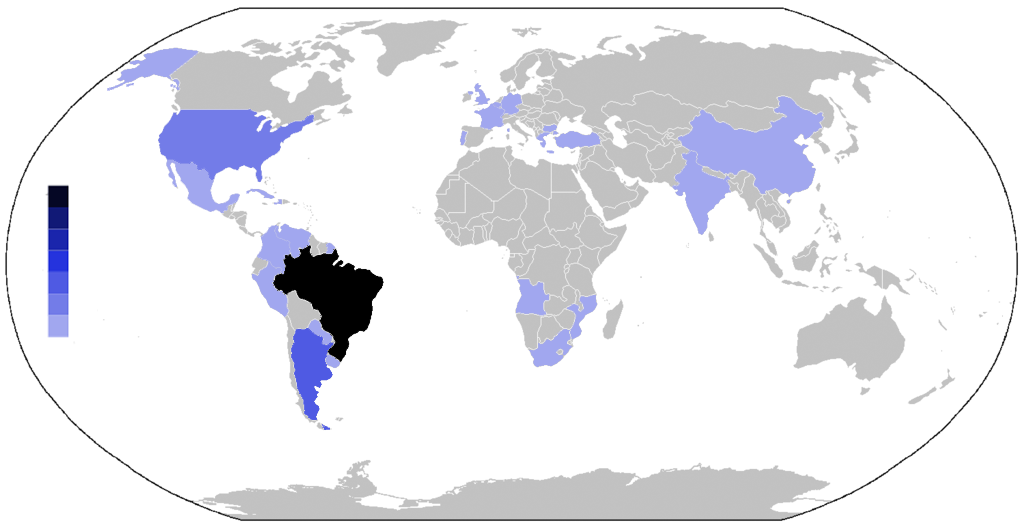
Map of international trips made by Dilma Rousseff as president: 1 visit 2 visits 3 visits 4 visits 5 visits 6 visits 7 or more visits Brazil

Number of visits	Country
1 visit	Angola, Australia, Belgium, Bulgaria, Chile, China, Colombia, Finland, Germany, Greece, Haiti, India, Mozambique, Paraguay, Portugal, Spain, Sweden, United Kingdom, Venezuela
2 visits	Cuba, Mexico, Peru, Russia, South Africa, Turkey, Uruguay
3 visits	France
4 visits	Argentina
5 visits	United States

== 2011 ==
The following international trips were made by President Dilma Rousseff in 2011:

Country	Areas visited	Date(s)	Notes
Argentina	Buenos Aires	31 January	Further information: Argentina–Brazil relations President Rousseff's state visit to Argentina was her first trip outside Brazil as president. She chose Argentina as the first foreign trip of her presidency in a demonstration of the "special and strategic" ties between the two countries. During her state visit to Buenos Aires, Rousseff stated that "it was not a casual decision to pick Argentina as my first foreign destination" and praised Argentina as a "strategic ally" to her country. She had a private meeting with President Cristina Kirchner at the Casa Rosada and signed several treaties to foster bilateral relations. She also met with the Mothers of the Plaza de Mayo.
Portugal	Lisbon; Coimbra	28–30 March	Further information: Brazil–Portugal relations During President Rousseff's 3-day visit to Portugal, she met with the Portuguese leadership in Lisbon and attended a ceremony at the University of Coimbra where former President Luiz Inácio Lula da Silva was awarded an honoris causa degree.
Greece	Athens	9 April	Further information: Brazil–Greece relations Before her trip to China, President Rousseff stopped in Athens to discuss Greece's debt crisis, as well as the European country's experience organizing the 2004 Olympic Games.
China	Beijing; Sanya; Boao; Xi'an	10–15 April	Further information: Brazil – China relations President Rousseff arrived in Beijing on 12 April. During the first official day of her state visit, President Rousseff attended the opening ceremony of the Brazil-China High Level Meeting on Science, Technology and Innovation and the closing ceremony of the Brazil-China Business Summit. Later, she received a ceremonial welcome at the Zhongnanhai where she met with President Hu Jintao and signed several treaties. On the evening of 12 April, she attended a state dinner offered by President Hu Jintao. On the second day of her visit, she met with the Chinese leadership in Beijing, including chairman Wu Bangguo and Premier Wen Jiabao. On 14 April, she traveled to Sanya where she attended the 2011 BRICS summit and held private meetings with the presidents of Russia, Dmitri Medvedev, and South Africa, Jacob Zuma, as well as with the prime ministers of India, Manmohan Singh, and Ukraine, Mykola Azarov. On 15 April, she traveled to Boao where she attended the Boao Forum for Asia. On the last day of her trip, President Rousseff visited the research and development center of the ZTE Corporation in Xi'an. She departed Xi'an Xianyang on 16 April en route to Brasília.
Uruguay	Montevideo	30 May	Further information: Brazil–Uruguay relations On 30 May, Rousseff made a one-day official visit to Uruguay where she met with President José Mujica. Despite the short trip, her agenda included a wide range of issues from power exchange, networking and rail freight transport to trade, tourism and digital television.
Paraguay	Asunción	28–29 June	President Rousseff traveled to Asunción as part of the 41st Mercosur summit. She also held a private bilateral meeting with President Fernando Lugo.
Peru	Lima	28 July	On 28 July, President Rousseff traveled to Lima where she attended the inauguration of President Ollanta Humala.
United States	New York City	18–22 September	Further information: Brazil and the United Nations President Rousseff arrived in New York on 18 September for her five-day visit as part of the General debate of the sixty-sixth session of the United Nations General Assembly. On 19 September, President Rousseff opened the High-Level Meeting on Noncommunicable Disease Prevention and Control at the United Nations and attended the High-Level Gathering of Women Political Leaders at UN Women. On 20 September, President Rousseff had private bilateral meetings with the presidents of Mexico, Felipe Calderón and the United States, Barack Obama. Obama and Rousseff hosted the formal launch of the Open Government Partnership at an event with heads of state and senior officials from 46 countries. On the evening of 20 September, she was awarded the Woodrow Wilson Public Service Award, a distinction which was also given to her predecessor in 2009. On the following day, she became the first woman to open a session of the United Nations General Assembly. She also held bilateral meetings with the presidents of France, Nicolas Sarkozy, Peru, Ollanta Humala, Colombia, Juan Manuel Santos, and with the Prime Minister of the United Kingdom, David Cameron. On the evening of 21 September, she attended a formal dinner offered by the Permanent Representative of Brazil to the United Nations, Maria Luiza Ribeiro Viotti. On the last day of her New York trip, she attended the High-Level Meeting on Nuclear Safety at the United Nations.
Belgium	Brussels	2–4 October	Further information: Brazil–European Union relations President Rousseff traveled to Brussels, Belgium, as part of a three-country tour of Europe. On 3 October, the President met with Prime Minister Yves Leterme and attended a state dinner offered by the presidents of the European Council, Herman Van Rompuy, and European Commission, José Manuel Barroso. On the following day, she attended the 5th EU–Brazil summit, aimed at strengthening the strategic partnership between Brazil and the European bloc. The President later attended a banquet at the Royal Castle of Laeken offered to her by King Albert II and Queen Paola. On the final engagement of her trip, the President attended the opening ceremony of the Europalia Brazil 2011 festival.
Bulgaria	Sofia; Gabrovo; Veliko Tarnovo	4–6 October	On 4 October, President Rousseff arrived in Bulgaria for the first time ever for an emotional back-to-the-roots visit to the homeland of her late emigrant father. The President was welcomed by her Bulgarian counterpart Georgy Parvanov at an official ceremony in the St. Alexander Nevsky Plaza. She later met with Prime Minister Boyko Borisov and Chairwoman Tsetska Tsacheva. During her visit, Rousseff was awarded Bulgaria's highest state honour, the Order of Stara Planina. On the evening of 5 October, the President attended the Brazil-Bulgaria Business summit. Aiming to expand Brazil's economic presence in Bulgaria, Rousseff was accompanied by key ministers and representatives from Brazil's biggest companies, including state-controlled oil company Petrobras, mining company Vale and aerospace conglomerate Embraer. While economic issues dominated the agenda, on the morning of 6 October, Rousseff paid a visit to the grave of her Bulgarian half-brother, Lyuben-Kamen Rusev in Sofia, whom she never met and who died in 2007 at the age of 78 and later visited the old Bulgarian capital of Veliko Tarnovo and her father's birthplace of Gabrovo on 6 October. There she was greeted by members of some 30 families that claim a common heritage with her father.
Turkey	Ankara; Istanbul	6–8 October	President Rousseff arrived in Ankara, Turkey, on the evening of 6 October for a three-day state visit. She was accompanied by her foreign, defense, finance, foreign trade, development, science and communications ministers. Topics on the presidential agenda included trade, energy and education as well as matters of regional and international concern. On the first day of her visit, Rousseff met with President Abdullah Gül and the two signed several bilateral agreements. The leaders also signed a joint declaration titled "Turkey-Brazil: A Strategic Perspective for a Dynamic Partnership". Later, the President visited the Atatürk Memorial and a spoke at the Brazil-Turkey Business Summit. On 8 October, Rousseff paid a visit to Istanbul's historical and touristic sites before returning to Brasília.
South Africa	Pretoria	17–18 October	Further information: Brazil – South Africa relations On 17 October, President Rousseff arrived in Pretoria, South Africa, on the first leg of her African tour that also included Mozambique and Angola. In Pretoria, President Rousseff met with her South African counterpart, Jacob Zuma, at the Presidential Guest House. Topics on the bilateral agenda included Security Council reform, the Euro area crisis, the situation in Syria and the military intervention in Libya. While in Pretoria, President Rousseff attended the 5th IBSA Summit and held a private meeting with Indian Prime Minister, Manmohan Singh. She departed Johannesburg International Airport on 18 October en route to Maputo.
Mozambique	Maputo	18–19 October	President Rousseff arrived in Maputo, Mozambique, on the evening of 18 October. In Maputo, the President took part in the ceremony paying tribute to the late Samora Machel, who was the leader of Mozambique's independence struggle and the first Mozambican president. President Rousseff also met with President Armando Guebuza and local businessmen. Rousseff's visit was expected to boost economic relations between Mozambique and Brazil. Trade between the two countries increased from 25 million dollars in 2010 to 60 million dollars in the first months of 2011. Mozambique has a number of Brazilian investments, notably coal mining projects in Moatize, and is currently considered to be the biggest beneficiary of Brazilian aid, involving approximately US$70 million in the areas of education, health, agriculture, and professional training. While in Maputo, the President inaugurated the new official residence of the Brazilian ambassador and opened an exhibition of Mozambican artists at the Brazil-Mozambique Cultural Center.
Angola	Luanda	19–20 October	Further information: Angola–Brazil relations President Rousseff was in Luanda on the third and final leg of an African tour which took her to South Africa and Mozambique. Rousseff's two-day official visit was aimed at strengthening bilateral cooperation. The two former Portuguese colonies enjoy strong relations as well as many cultural links. During her visit, the President met her Angolan counterpart, José Eduardo dos Santos, and was also at the National Assembly, where she addressed a speech. "Angola's relaunch is a paradigm for other countries in Africa in terms of economic and social stability. It is an example for hope," she told the country's parliament. Rousseff said she hoped Angola and Brazil would continue to deepen their cooperation, particularly in agriculture and energy. A trade delegation from Brazil, she said would visit Angola in November 2011. In the past six years, Brazil has extended more than US$3 billion in credit lines to Angola, most of which has been spent on post-war construction projects such as new roads, dams and bridges. President Rousseff, left the Angolan capital on the evening of 20 October.
France	Cannes; Paris	1–5 November	Further information: 2011 G-20 Cannes summit President Rousseff was in France for a week-long trip as part of the 2011 G-20 Cannes summit. The President was accompanied by the Minister of Foreign Relations, Antonio Patriota, the Minister of Finance, Guido Mantega, the Press Secretary, Helena Chagas, and the Spokesman of the Presidency, Rodrigo Baena. During the summit, she expressed Brazil's readiness to offer aid to troubled countries in Europe through the International Monetary Fund, and called for "leadership, clear vision, and swift action" in response to the economic crisis. On the eve of the summit, the Brazilian delegation had attempted to coordinate actions for offering aid to the EU with fellow BRICS members Russia, India, China and South Africa. During her visit, she also held bilateral meetings with the prime ministers of Australia, Germany, Turkey, and Singapore, as well as with the presidents of China and Indonesia. On 5 November, she flew to Paris, where she visited the UNESCO headquarters and met with its General Director, Irina Bokova. She told Bokova that Brazil strongly supports UNESCO, and praised the recent admission of Palestine as a full member of the organization.
Venezuela	Caracas	1–2 December	The President was in Caracas for a two-day summit of the Community of Latin American and Caribbean States. At the summit, Rousseff stressed the need to boost local industries and increase trade within the region in order to ride out turbulent times. She also held bilateral meetings with the presidents of Venezuela, Bolivia and Argentina. Venezuela agreed to purchase 20 commercial planes from Brazil's Embraer.
Argentina	Buenos Aires	10 December	Rousseff traveled to Buenos Aires to attend the swearing-in ceremony of Cristina Fernández de Kirchner's second term as president.
Uruguay	Montevideo	20 December	President Rousseff was in Montevideo for the 42nd Mercosur summit. Topics on the agenda included a free-trade agreement with Palestine, Venezuela's permanent membership proposal and a draft resolution barring Falklands' flagged vessels from all regional ports.

== 2012 ==
The following international trips have been made by President Dilma Rousseff during her second year in office as of December 2012:

Country	Areas visited	Date(s)	Notes
Cuba	Havana; Mariel	30 January – 1 February	Further information: Brazil–Cuba relations Rousseff traveled to Cuba on 30 January for a 3-day state visit to the island. The presidential agenda was focused on improving the economic ties and expanding Brazil's influence in the region. According to Matthew Taylor, a Brazil specialist at the American University's School of International Service, the visit was about "growing Brazil's soft power on the international scale and raising Brazil's role in the world". In Havana, Rousseff met with president Raúl Castro and with former president Fidel Castro. Brazil is investing $800 million in renovation of Cuba's Mariel port, a strategic infrastructure project to increase trade. The Brazilian government will also open a $350 million credit line to Cuba to finance food purchases, and another $200 million to purchase agricultural equipment. Rousseff also signed several science and technology cooperation agreements. At a press conference, Rousseff pointed to the United States embargo against Cuba as a source of its economic woes, and as another motive for Brazil's support of the Cuban economy.
Haiti	Port-au-Prince	1 February	Rousseff arrived in Haiti on 1 February 2012, for a state visit. She met with Haitian President Michel Martelly and Prime Minister Garry Conille. On the agenda were economic ties and the efforts to deal with Haitian refugees arriving in Brazil since the 2010 Haiti earthquake. The Brazilian states of Acre and Amazonas have seen an influx of undocumented Haitians since the quake. Brazil announced that it had allocated more than $500,000 to help the more than 4,000 Haitian immigrants who are being granted permanent residency.
Germany	Hanover	5–6 March	President Rousseff traveled to Hanover, Germany, to attend the 2012 CeBIT trade fair, following an invitation from the German government. Brazil was chosen as a partner country for the 2012 event. On 5 March, she opened the fair and gave a speech, followed by a private meeting with Chancellor Angela Merkel. Rousseff used the opportunity to express her concerns "about the monetary expansion in Europe and the United States" which she said resulted in an "artificial currency devaluation." She also stressed the need for the International Monetary Fund to give developing nations more say at the lending institution. In response, Merkel said it was "very natural" that emerging countries should see their influence boosted at the IMF and said that on this point, Brazil and Germany were "of one mind."
India	New Delhi	27–31 March	Further information: Brazil–India relations and BRICS President Rousseff traveled to New Delhi, India for the 2012 BRICS summit and for her first state visit to India. The summit was focused on increasing cooperation among the BRICS countries, including the establishment of a BRICS development bank. Rousseff also held bilateral meetings with the BRICS leaders on the sidelines of the summit. During the second part of her trip, the state visit to India, she met with Prime Minister Manmohan Singh and President Pratibha Patil. On the bilateral agenda, Rousseff announced that Brazil plans to boost its trade with India from US$9.2 billion (2011) to US$15 billion by 2015. During her visit, she was awarded an honoris causa degree by the University of Delhi.
United States	Washington, D.C. Boston	9–10 April	Further information: Brazil – United States relations On 9 April 2012, Rousseff made her first official visit to Washington as President of Brazil. She met with President Obama at the White House, where the two leaders had a working lunch. Obama and Rousseff highlighted the areas of cooperation on energy development, education and trade. The United States also announced it was opening two new consulates in Brazil, and the two countries forged an agreement to bolster the trade of cachaça, Brazil's sugarcane liquor. Rousseff also participated at a business summit and met with American businessmen. On 10 April, Rousseff went to Boston to visit the Massachusetts Institute of Technology and Harvard University. The two institutions were chosen by the Brazilian government as partners for its "Science Without Borders" program, which seeks to send 100,000 Brazilian students overseas for science education and training.
Colombia	Cartagena	14–15 April	President Rousseff visited Colombia to take part in the 6th Summit of the Americas in Cartagena.
Mexico	Los Cabos	17–19 June	The president travelled to Los Cabos, Mexico, to attend the 2012 G-20 Mexico summit. Rousseff also attended a meeting of the BRICS group and held bilateral meetings with several leaders, including Mario Monti, Angela Merkel, Vladimir Putin, and Mariano Rajoy.
Argentina	Mendoza	28–29 June	President Rousseff visited Argentina to take part in the 43th Summit of Mercosur and in the concurrent extraordinary summit of Unasur in Mendoza. The extraordinary summit of Unasur was summoned in order to discuss the Paraguayan political crisis after the impeachment that ousted President Fernando Lugo.
United Kingdom	London	25–28 July	Rousseff travelled to London on 25 July 2012, to attend the opening ceremony of the 2012 Summer Olympics. She also held a meeting with Prime Minister David Cameron at 10 Downing Street. In addition, she inaugurated the Casa Brasil or Brazil House, the national house of the Brazilian Olympic Committee during the 2012 Olympic Games. On 27 July, she attended an official reception by Queen Elizabeth II at Buckingham Palace.
United States	New York City	25 September – 1 October	Opening of the 67th UN Assembly.
Peru	Lima	1–2 October	Participation in the 3rd Summit of Heads of State and Government of South America-Arab Countries (SAAC).
Spain	Cádiz; Madrid	15–19 November	Official visit
Argentina	Buenos Aires	28 November	Participation in the Conference "Argentina and Brazil, integration and development or the risk of primarization".
France	Paris	9–12 December	Travel with three issues: measures to contain the impact of the international economic crisis, which affects mainly the countries of the eurozone, and issues related to defense and science, technology and innovation.
Russia	Moscow	13–14 December	First official visit to Russia as president of Brazil, with the objective of increasing trade between the two emerging countries.

== 2013 ==
The following international trips were made by President Dilma Rousseff in 2013:

Country	Areas visited	Date(s)	Notes
Chile	Santiago	25–28 January	President Rousseff traveled to Santiago to attend the first CELAC–EU summit. She cut her trip short to return to Brazil after the Kiss nightclub fire in Santa Maria.
South Africa	Durban	25–27 March	Further information: 5th BRICS summit President Rousseff traveled to Durban to attend the 5th BRICS summit.
Russia	Saint Petersburg	5–6 September	President Rousseff traveled to Saint Petersburg to attend the 2013 G20 Saint Petersburg summit.

On 17 September 2013, President Rousseff cancelled her state visit to Washington, D.C., on 3 October 2013, because of alleged spying by the United States that targeted Brazil.

== 2014 ==
The following international trips were made by President Dilma Rousseff in 2014:

Country	Areas visited	Date(s)	Notes
Cuba	Havana; Mariel	26–28 January	Further information: Brazil–Cuba relations President Rousseff traveled to Cuba to attend the inauguration of the expanded Mariel port and the CELAC summit in Havana. She called the United States embargo against Cuba unfair.
Australia	Brisbane	15–16 November	Further information: 2014 G20 Brisbane summit President Rousseff traveled to Brisbane to attend the 2014 G20 Brisbane summit. She also met with the other BRICS heads of state on the sidelines.

== 2015 ==
The following international trips were made by President Dilma Rousseff in 2015:

Country	Areas visited	Date(s)	Notes
Mexico	Mexico City	25–27 May	Further information: Brazil–Mexico relations President Rousseff travelled to Mexico for a state visit. President Rousseff met with President Enrique Peña Nieto at the National Palace to discuss agreements on commercial cooperation, investment protection, tourism, and trade. The President also attended a session of the Congress of the Union and visited the National Museum of Anthropology.
United States	Washington, D.C. Silicon Valley; New York City	29–30 June	Further information: Brazil–United States relations President Rousseff met with President Barack Obama at the White House nearly two years after she cancelled a state visit to Washington over revelations that the United States had spied on Brazil. The two leaders sought to put the dispute behind them and to expand bilateral trade and investment, as China had overtaken the United States as Brazil's largest trading partner. Rousseff also travelled to New York to meet with investment bankers and to Silicon Valley to promote Brazil's information technology industry.
Sweden	Stockholm	18–19 October	Further information: Brazil–Sweden relations President Rousseff travelled to Sweden for an official visit. President Rousseff met with Prime Minister Stefan Löfven and King Carl XVI Gustaf of Sweden and Queen Silvia of Sweden at the Stockholm Palace. She also met with representatives from the city of Stockholm and took part in a business forum.
Finland	Helsinki	19–20 October	Further information: Brazil–Finland relations President Rousseff travelled to Finland for an official visit. President Rousseff met with President Sauli Niinistö at the Presidential Palace, Helsinki and also met with Prime Minister Juha Sipilä.
Turkey	Antalya	14–16 November	Further information: Brazil–Turkey relations President Rousseff attended the G-20 summit in Antalya.
France	Paris	30 November	President Rousseff attended the COP21 in Paris.

== 2016 ==
The following international trips were made by President Dilma Rousseff in 2016:

Country	Areas visited	Date(s)	Notes
United States	New York City	22 April	President Rousseff traveled to New York to sign the Paris Agreement on climate change at the United Nations. She also used the trip to speak against her impeachment proceedings.

== See also ==
- List of international presidential trips made by Luiz Inácio Lula da Silva, her predecessor
- List of international presidential trips made by Michel Temer, her successor
