= List of international presidential trips made by Jair Bolsonaro =

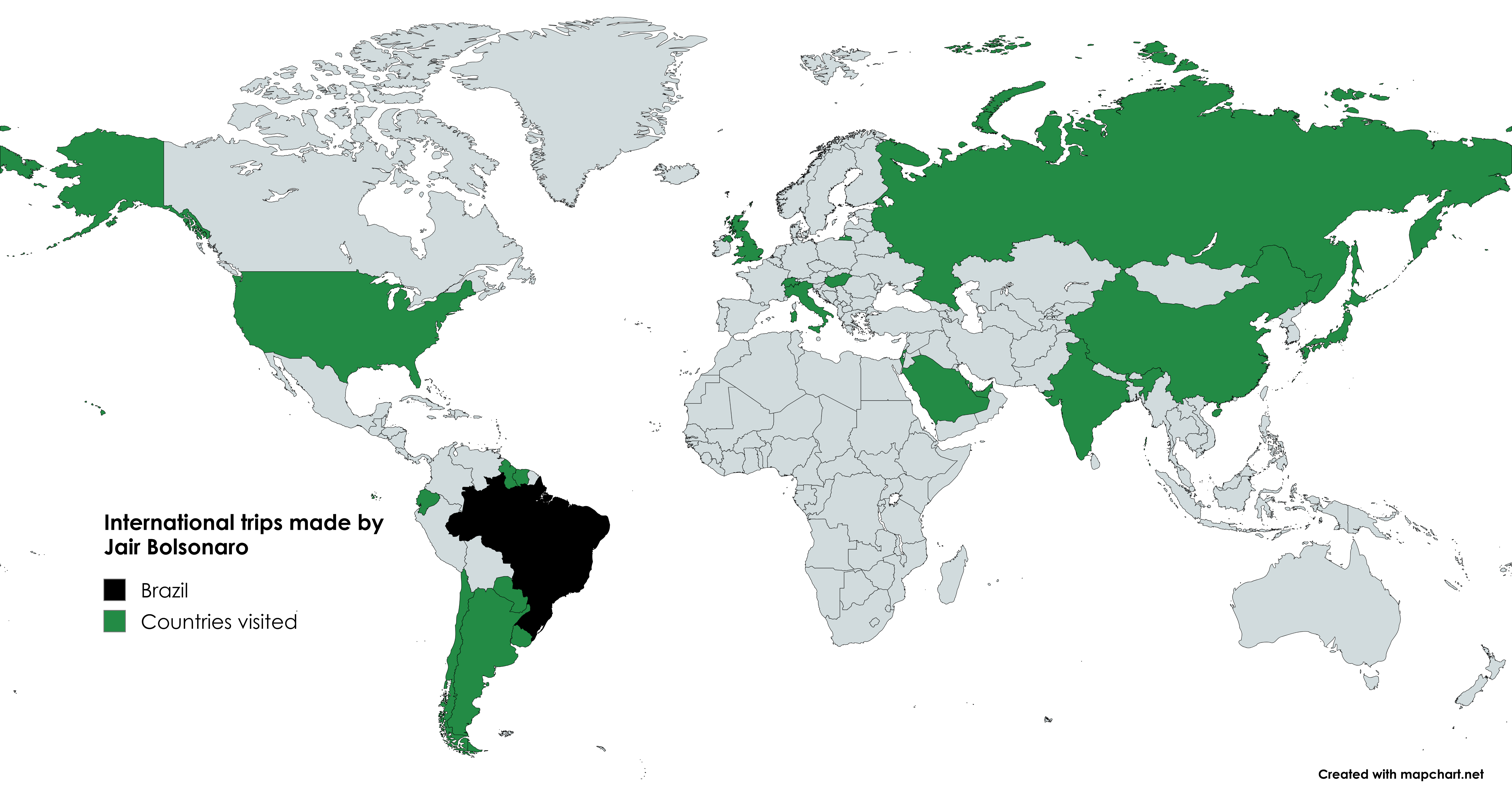
International trips made by Jair Bolsonaro.

This is a list of international presidential trips made by Jair Bolsonaro, the 38th President of Brazil. President Bolsonaro has made 29 international trips to 22 countries during his presidency, which began on 1 January 2019 and ended on 31 December 2022. The official residence of the Brazilian president is the Palácio da Alvorada and principal workplace is the Palácio do Planalto, both in Brasília.

The number of visits per country where he traveled are:

- One visit to Bahrain, China, Chile, Ecuador, Guyana, Hungary, Israel, India, Italy, Paraguay, Russia, Saudi Arabia, Suriname, Switzerland, United Kingdom, Uruguay, and the Vatican
- Two visits to Argentina, Japan, Qatar, and the United Arab Emirates
- Eight visits to the United States

== 2019 ==
The following are the international trips made by President Bolsonaro in 2019.

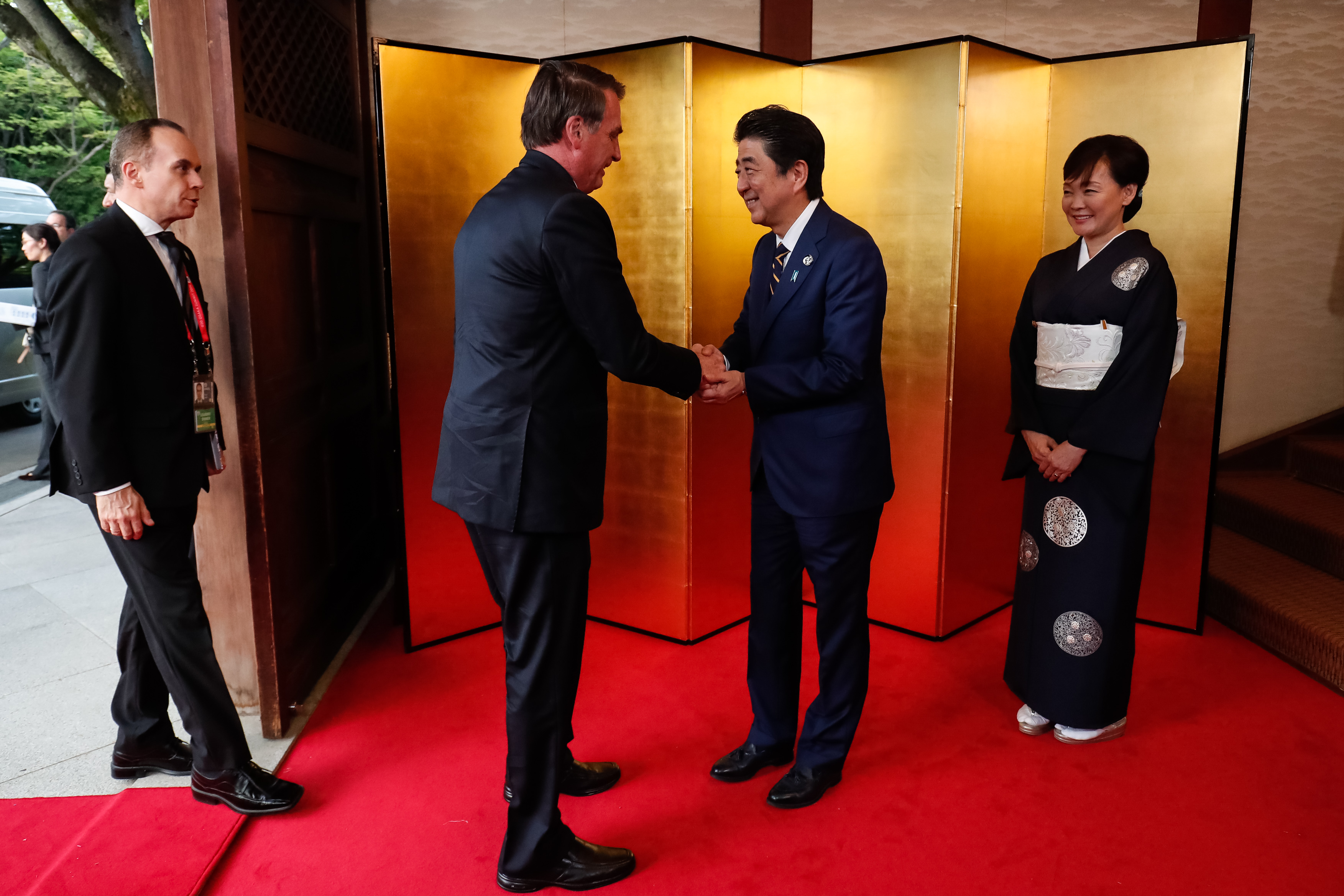
Japanese prime minister Shinzō Abe and his spouse Akie Abe welcoming Brazilian president Jair Bolsonaro for dinner on 28 June at the Osaka State Guest House

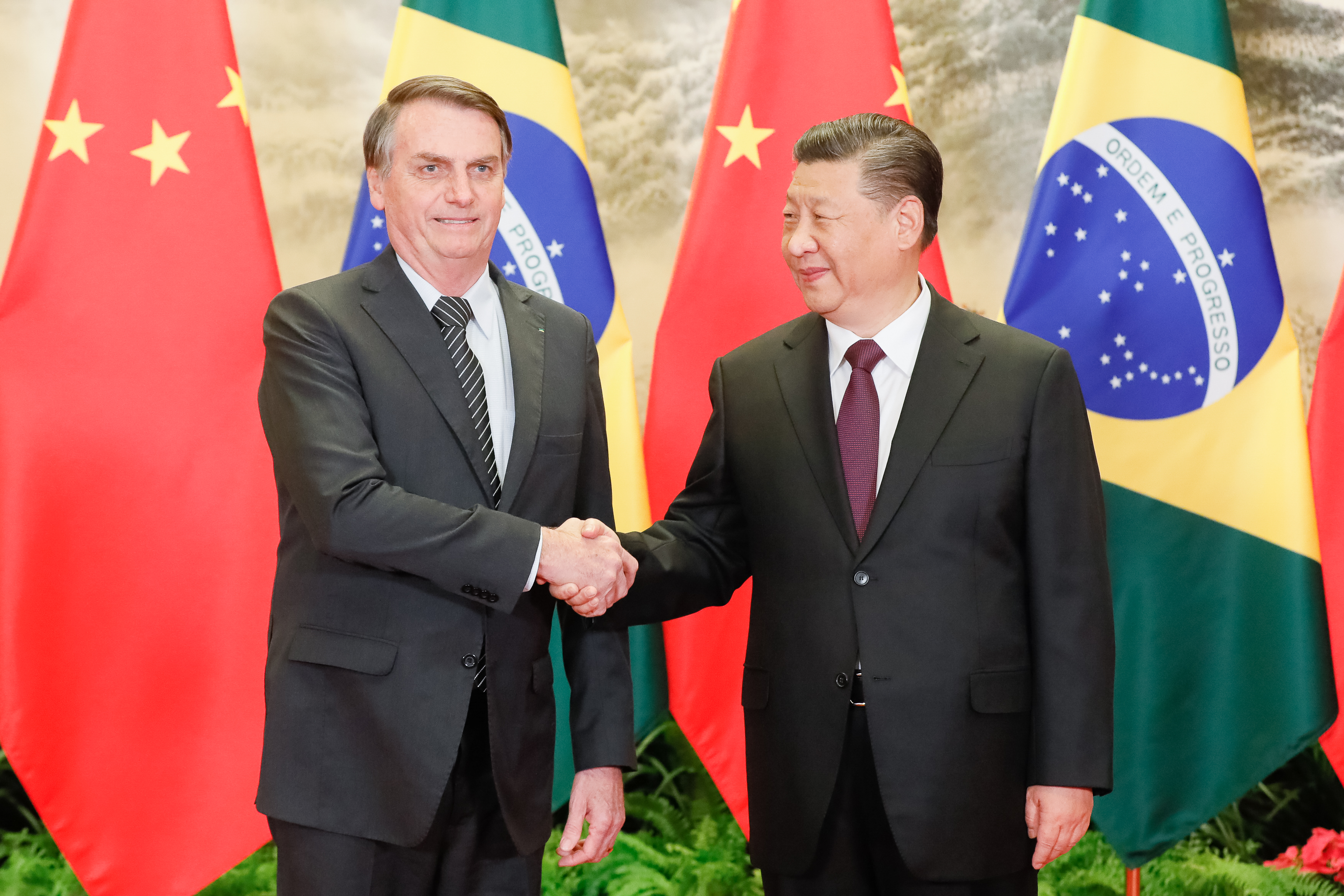
Bolsonaro with Chinese President Xi Jinping in Beijing, October 2019

	Dates	Country	Locations	Details
1	22–25 January	Switzerland	Davos	Attendance to the World Economic Forum. Met with Japanese Prime Minister Shinzō Abe, President Ueli Maurer, Italian Prime Minister Giuseppe Conte, Ukrainian President Petro Poroshenko, Dutch Prime Minister Mark Rutte, Polish President Andrzej Duda, Colombian President Iván Duque, South African President Cyril Ramaphosa and Czech Prime Minister Andrej Babiš.
2	18–20 March	United States	Washington, D.C.	Working visit. Met with President Donald Trump. Nomination of Brazil as Major non-NATO ally.
3	21–23 March	Chile	Santiago	State visit. Met with President Sebastián Piñera. Attendance to the first PROSUR summit.
4	31 March 31 – 4 April	Israel	Tel Aviv; Jerusalem	State visit. Met with Prime Minister Benjamin Netanyahu. Announcement of the opening of a business office of the Ministry of Foreign Affairs in Jerusalem, and possible transfer of the Brazilian embassy to the city. First Brazilian President to visit the Western Wall.
5	14–16 May	United States	Dallas	Awarded as the Person of the Year of Brazilian-American Chamber of Commerce. Met with Former President George W. Bush.
6	6–7 June	Argentina	Buenos Aires	State visit. Met with President Mauricio Macri.
7	27–29 June	Japan	Osaka	Attendance to the G20 Osaka summit. Met with U.S. President Donald Trump, Chinese President Xi Jinping, Russian President Vladimir Putin, German Chancellor Angela Merkel, French President Emmanuel Macron, Indian Prime Minister Narendra Modi, Prime Minister Shinzō Abe, Saudi Crown Prince Mohammad bin Salman and South African President Cyril Ramaphosa. Announcement of the European Union–Mercosur free trade agreement.
8	17 July	Argentina	Santa Fe	Attendance to the Mercosur summit. Met with President Mauricio Macri.
9	23–24 September	United States	New York City	Attendance to the United Nations General Assembly. Met with President Donald Trump and UN Secretary-General António Guterres.
10	21–24 October	Japan	Tokyo	Attendance to the enthronement ceremony of Emperor Naruhito. Met with Prime Minister Shinzō Abe, British Prince of Wales Charles and Ukrainian President Volodymyr Zelenskyy.
10	24–26 October	China	Beijing	State visit. Met with President Xi Jinping, Premier Li Keqiang and the Standing Committee of the National People's Congress Chairman Li Zhanshu. Announcement of the end of the need for visas for Chinese and Indian entry into Brazil.
10	26–27 October	United Arab Emirates	Abu Dhabi	State visit. Met with Abu Dhabian Crown Prince Mohammed bin Zayed Al Nahyan. Announcement of a cooperation program for the joint development of defense materials, in addition to an exchange of information against terrorist organizations.
10	28 October 28	Qatar	Doha	State visit. Met with Emir Tamim bin Hamad Al Thani.
10	28–30 October	Saudi Arabia	Riyadh	State visit. Met with King Salman and Crown Prince Mohammad bin Salman. Saudi Arabia's announcement of a US$10 billion investment in Brazil in the area of infrastructure. Attendance to the Future Investment Initiative summit.

== 2020 ==
The following are the international trips made by President Bolsonaro in 2020.

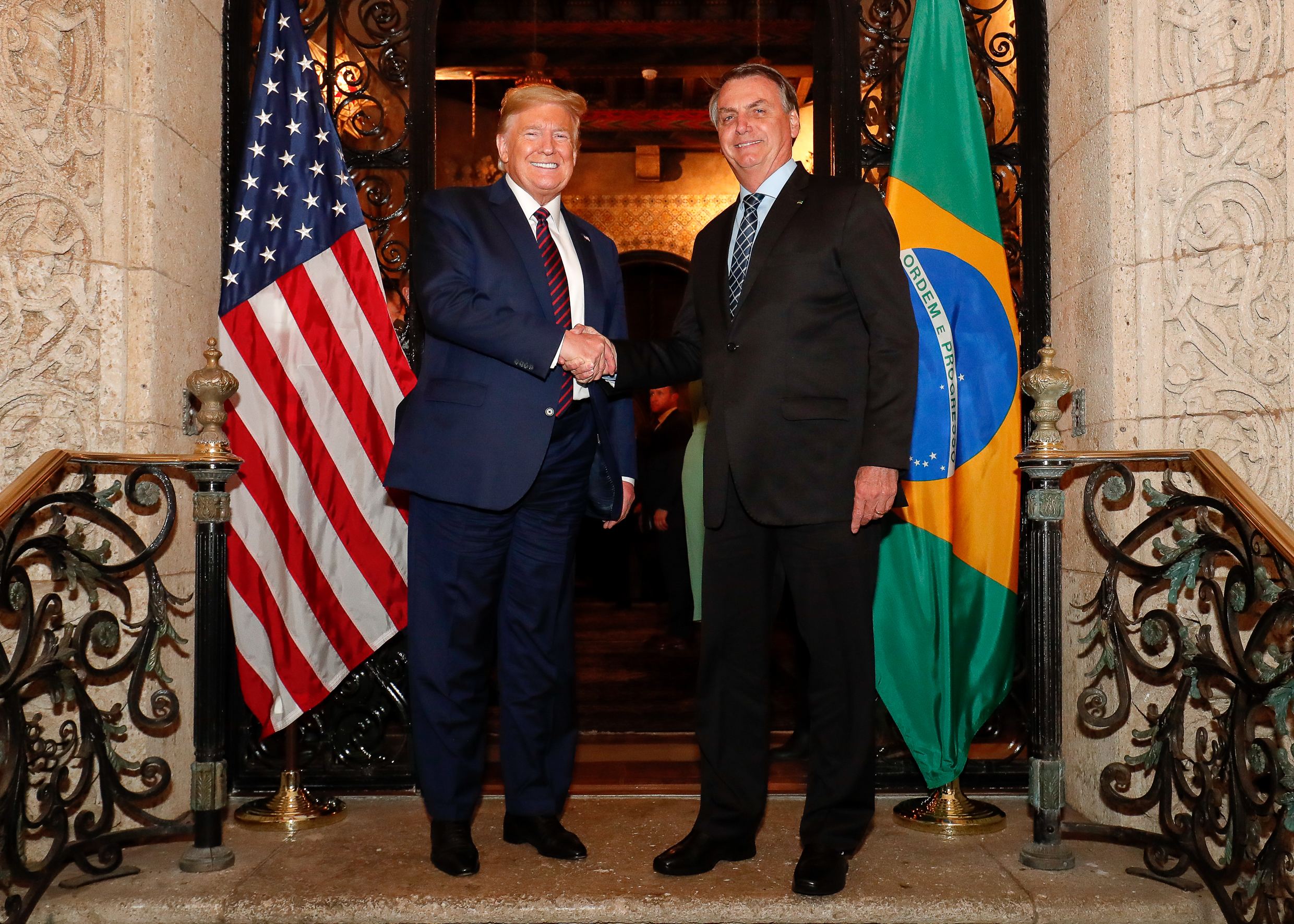
Bolsonaro with U.S. President Donald Trump at Mar-a-Lago, March 2020

	Dates	Country	Locations	Details
12	24–27 January	India	New Delhi; Agra	State visit. Met with Prime Minister Narendra Modi, President Ram Nath Kovind and Vice President Venkaiah Naidu. Chief guest to the 2020 Republic Day celebrations and signature of 15 cooperation agreements in different areas.
13	1 March	Uruguay	Montevideo	Working visit. Attendance to the inauguration of President Luis Lacalle Pou. Met with Chilean President Sebastián Piñera.
14	7–10 March	United States	Miami; Mar-a-Lago; Doral; Jacksonville	Working visit. Met with President Donald Trump, discussed the U.S.-led effort to oust Venezuelan disputed President Nicolás Maduro, a future trade deal and peace for the Middle East. Trump reaffirmed his interest in upgrading the American military alliance with Brazil, suggesting give to the country a full NATO membership. Visited the U.S. Southern Command.

== 2021 ==
The following are the international trips made by President Bolsonaro in 2021.

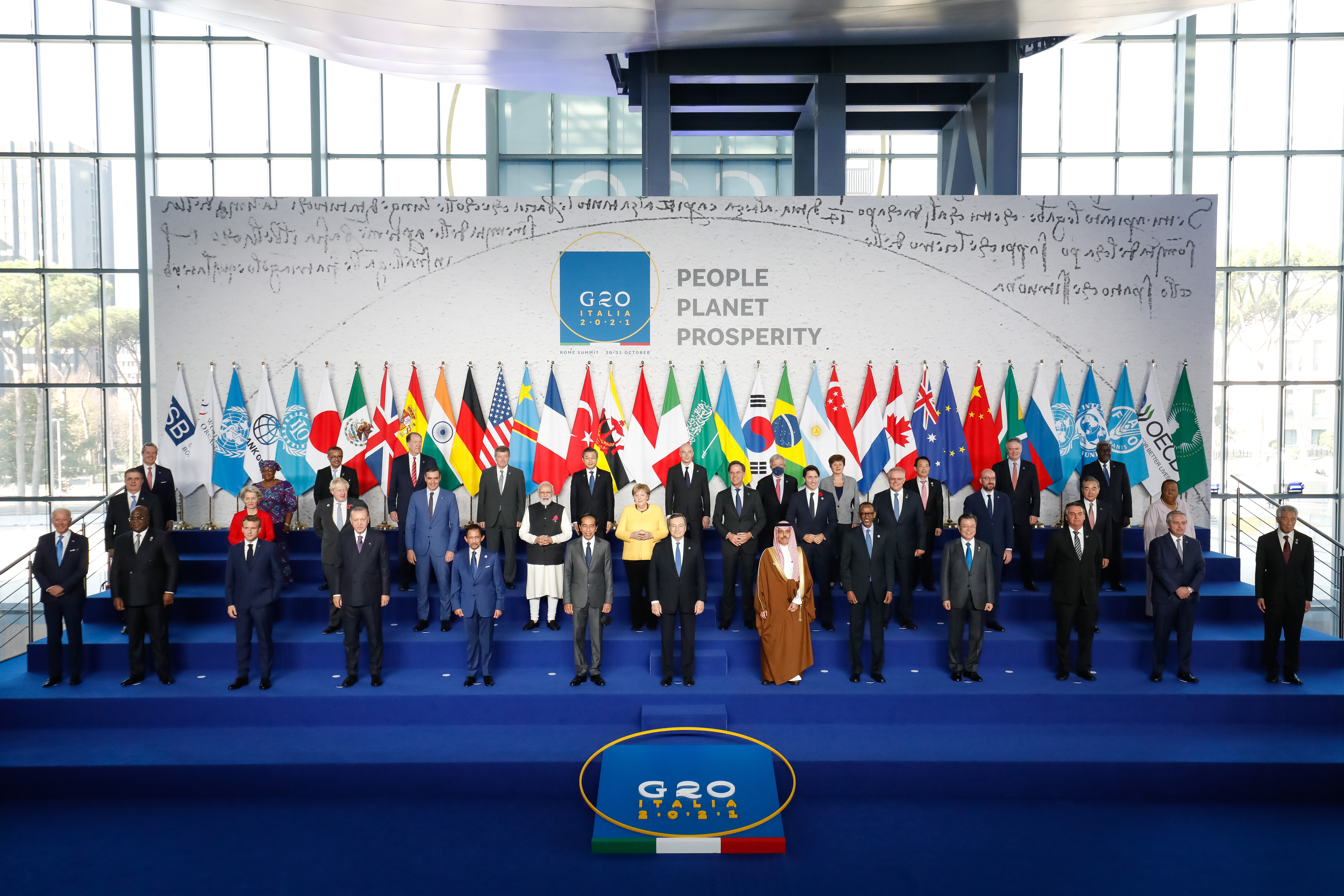
Bolsonaro in Rome for the G20 summit, October 2021

	Dates	Country	Locations	Details
15	23–24 May	Ecuador	Quito	Working visit. Attendance to the inauguration of Guillermo Lasso as President of Ecuador.
16	20–21 September	United States	New York City	Working visit. Attendance to the United Nations General Assembly. Met with British Prime Minister Boris Johnson, Polish President Andrzej Duda and UN Secretary-General António Guterres.
17	29 October – 2 November	Italy	Rome; Padua; Anguillara Veneta; Pistoia	Working visit. Attendance to the G20 Rome summit. Met Italian President Sergio Mattarella and Prime Minister Mario Draghi, British Prime Minister Boris Johnson, Indian Prime Minister Narendra Modi, German Chancellor Angela Merkel, Turkish President Recep Tayyip Erdogan, Argentine President Alberto Fernández, Australian Prime Minister Scott Morrison, U.S. Special Presidential Envoy for Climate John Kerry, World Bank President David Malpass, World Health Organization Director-General Tedros Adhanom and the OECD Director-General Mathias Cormann. President Bolsonaro was recognized as an honorary citizen of Anguillara Veneta, his paternal grandfather's hometown.
17	30 October	Vatican	Vatican City	Trip to Rome. The visit to the Vatican was not official. Visited the St. Peter's Square.
18	November 13–16, 2021	United Arab Emirates	Dubai	Working visit. Attendance to the Expo Dubai 2020 and Dubai Air Show. Met with Abu Dhabian Crown Prince Mohammed bin Zayed Al Nahyan, Emir Mohammed bin Rashid Al Maktoum and Sheikh Nahayan Mabarak Al Nahayan.
18	16–17 November	Bahrain	Manama	State visit. Visit to recently inaugurated Brazilian embassy in Manama. Met with King Hamad Bin Isa Al Khalifa.
18	17–18 November	Qatar	Doha	State visit. Visit to 2022 FIFA World Cup Lusail Iconic Stadium. Met with Emir Tamim bin Hamad Al Thani.

== 2022 ==
The following are the international trips made by President Bolsonaro in 2022.

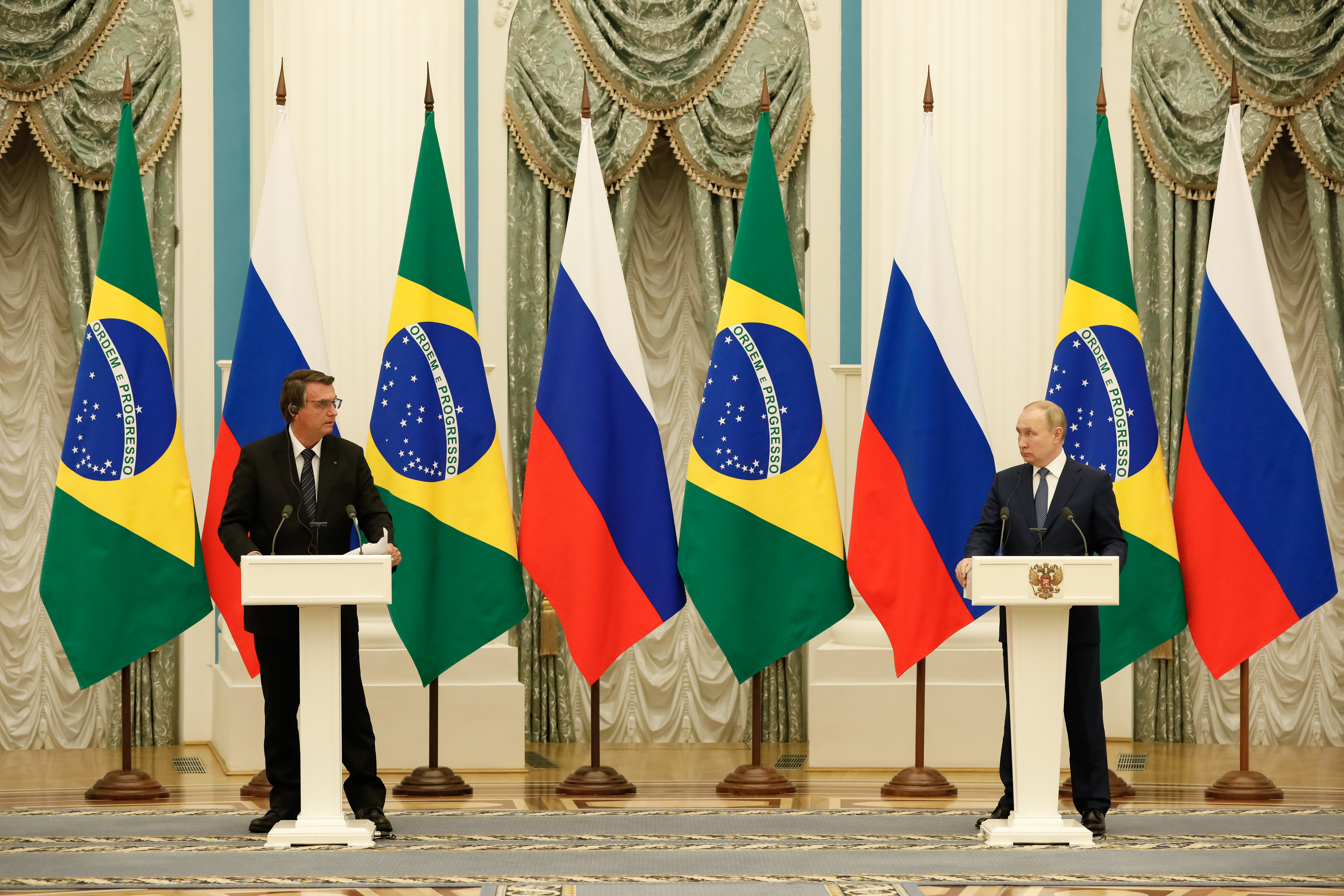
Bolsonaro with Russian President Vladimir Putin in Moscow, February 2022

	Dates	Country	Locations	Details
19	20–21 January	Suriname	Paramaribo	Working visit. Meeting with the President of Suriname, Chan Santokhi, and the President of Guyana, Irfaan Ali. Signed cooperation agreements for exploration of new Guyanese and Surinamese reserves of gas and oil by Petrobras.
20	15–17 February	Russia	Moscow	State visit. President Bolsonaro was invited by Vladimir Putin to a Russia-Brazil summit at Kremlin, amid tension with the US and NATO over Ukraine. Discussion about the global geopolitical situation and tension in Europe, cooperation in defense for technology for cyber security and combat systems for UAVs. Russia formally supports a permanent seat for Brazil in the UN Security Council. Bolsonaro also visits the State Duma and meet with the Duma's Chairman Vyacheslav Volodin.
20	17 February	Hungary	Budapest	State visit. Meeting with the Prime Minister Viktor Orban, President János Áder and the National Assembly Chairman László Kövér.
21	6 May	Guyana	Georgetown	State visit. Meeting with President Irfaan Ali. Addressed bilateral issues between Brazil and Guyana in the areas of trade, oil, economy, infrastructure and electricity.
22	9–11 June	United States	Los Angeles, Orlando	Working visit. In Los Angeles, the President attended the Summit of the Americas and had a bilateral meeting with President Joe Biden. The President also met with Colombian president Iván Duque, with Ecuadorian president Guillermo Lasso and with Dominican president Luis Abinader. In Orlando, Bolsonaro participated in the inauguration of the Brazilian vice consulate in the city.
23	31 August	Paraguay	Brazil–Paraguay border	Working visit. President Bolsonaro met with President of Paraguay, Mario Abdo Benítez to make a technical visit over the Jaime Lerner bridge, which connects the cities of Foz do Iguaçu and Ciudad del Este. He briefly crossed the border line to the Paraguayan side.
24	18–19 September	United Kingdom	London	State visit. President Bolsonaro went to the Palace of Westminster, where the funeral of Queen Elizabeth II was taking place. Had a meeting with the new King of the United Kingdom Charles III, meeting at Buckingham Palace, with other Heads of State Government. Attended the state funeral of Queen Elizabeth II in Westminster Abbey magazine with First Lady Michelle Bolsonaro. Both were received for a meeting by the Secretary of State for Foreign, Commonwealth and Development Affairs and UK Minister James Cleverly.
24	20 September	United States	New York City	Working visit. President Bolsonaro will deliver the traditional opening address of the United Nations General Assembly.
25	30-31 December	United States	Florida	President Bolsonaro travelled Florida to avoid the inauguration to his successor, Luiz Inácio Lula da Silva, who defeated him in the 2022 Brazilian general election.

== Multilateral meetings ==
The following multilateral meetings to take place during President Bolsonaro's 2019–2022 term in office.

Group	Year			
Group	2019	2020	2021	2022
BRICS	13–14 November, (Brazil) Brasília	17 November, (Note: Virtual speech due to the COVID-19 pandemic) (Russia) Saint Petersburg	9 September, (Note: Virtual speech due to the COVID-19 pandemic) (India) New Delhi	23 June, (Note: Virtual speech due to the COVID-19 pandemic) (China) Beijing
G20	28–29 June, (Japan) Osaka	21–22 November, (Note: Virtual speech due to the COVID-19 pandemic) (Saudi Arabia) Riyadh	30–31 October, (Italy) Rome	15–16 November, (Indonesia) Bali
SOA (OAS)	None			8–10 June, (United States) Los Angeles
UNGA	23–30 September, (United States) New York City	22–29 September, (Note: Virtual speech due to the COVID-19 pandemic.) (United States) New York City	20–21 September, (United States) New York City	20–26 September, (United States) New York City
WEF	22–25 January, (Switzerland) Davos	21–24 January, (Switzerland) Davos	25–29 January, (Switzerland) Davos	17–21 January, (Switzerland) Davos
COP			31 October– 12 November, (Note: Represented by the Minister of the Environment Joaquim Alvaro Pereira Leite.) (United Kingdom) Glasgow	
██ = Did not attend

== See also ==
- List of International Presidential Trips made by Michel Temer, his predecessor
- List of international presidential trips made by Luiz Inácio Lula da Silva, his successor
