= List of international presidential trips made by Michel Temer =

This is a list of presidential trips of Michel Temer, the 37th President of Brazil, who took office on 31 August 2016 after the impeachment of Dilma Rousseff. This list covers the diplomatic trips made by Michel Temer from his inauguration on 31 August 2016 until the end of his term on 1 January 2019.

== Trips by country ==
International trips made by Michel Temer as President of Brazil (2016–2019).

Number of visits	Country
1 visit	South Africa; Germany; Cape Verde; Chile; Guatemala; India; Japan; Mexico; Norway; Peru; Russia; Switzerland; Uruguay
2 visits	China; Portugal
3 visits	Argentina; United States; Paraguay

== 2016 ==
Image		Country	Location	Dates	Details
1	Two men shaking hands and smiling.	China	Hangzhou; Shanghai	2–5 September	On 2 September, Temer made his first trip as full President to China, where he was received by the President of the People's Republic of China, Xi Jinping, and took part in the G20 summit.
2	Man speaking at a microphone from a podium.	United States	New York	18–21 September	Temer took part in the General Debate of the 71st Session of the United Nations General Assembly.
3	Two men shaking hands and smiling.	Argentina	Buenos Aires	3 October	Temer was received by the President of Argentina, Mauricio Macri, for a series of meetings on trade relations between the two countries. Topics discussed on the first official trip to Brazil's South American neighbours included the countries' border situation, the internal politics of Mercosur and the bloc's international agreements.
3	Two men shaking hands and smiling.	Paraguay	Asunción	3 October	A lightning visit aimed, in the president's words, at "intensifying relations and increasing the degree of friendship".
4	Two men shaking hands and greeting.	India	Goa	15–17 October	Temer took part in the Meeting of Heads of State and Government of BRICS.
4	Two men seated in conversation with hands clasped.	Japan	Tokyo	18–19 October	Temer's trip to Japan was the first by a Brazilian head of state to the country in 11 years.

== 2017 ==
Image		Country	Location	Dates	Details
5	Temer attends the funeral of Portuguese former President Mário Soares, in January 2017.	Portugal	Lisbon	10 January	Temer was officially received by the President of Portugal, Marcelo Rebelo de Sousa, to attend the state funeral of former Portuguese President Mário Soares.
6	President Michel Temer and Russian President Vladimir Putin in 2017.	Russia	Moscow	20–22 June	The president and the Brazilian delegation watched a performance by the Bolshoi Ballet, one of the most famous in the world. Temer was received by the President of Russia, Vladimir Putin, for a bilateral meeting on trade agreements and cooperation in several areas strategic to both countries.
6	Temer and Norwegian Prime Minister Erna Solberg, in June 2017.	Norway	Oslo	22–23 June	Temer and the Prime Minister of Norway, Erna Solberg, discussed trade and the environment.
7	Temer and German Chancellor Angela Merkel, in July 2017.	Germany	Berlin	7–8 July	The president took part in a meeting of the Heads of State and Government of BRICS and a working session of the G20 Summit.
8	Temer and regional leaders at the Mercosur Summit, in July 2017.	Argentina	Mendonza	21 July	Temer took part in the 50th Meeting of the Common Market Council and the Summit of Mercosur and Associated States, in Mendoza, Argentina.
9	Temer and Portuguese President Marcelo Rebelo de Sousa, in August 2017.	Portugal	Lisbon	29–30 August	Meeting with the President of the Portuguese Republic, Marcelo Rebelo de Sousa.
9	Temer and Chinese President Xi Jinping during the BRICS Summit, in August 2017.	China	Beijing; Xiamei	3 August–4 September	Temer took part in the 50th Meeting of the Common Market Council and the BRICS Summit, and spoke with BRICS business leaders.
10	Temer speaks at the United Nations General Assembly, in September 2017.	United States	New York	18–21 September	Temer took part in the General Debate of the 72nd Session of the United Nations General Assembly.
11	Temer and Argentine President Mauricio Macri, in December 2017.	Argentina	Buenos Aires	10 December	Opening session of the 11th Ministerial Conference of the World Trade Organization.

== 2018 ==
Image		Country	Location	Dates	Details
12	Temer gives an interview during the World Economic Forum, in January 2018.	Switzerland	Davos	22–25 January	Speech at the Plenary Session of the World Economic Forum.
13	Temer attends the presidential inauguration of Sebastián Piñera, in March 2018.	Chile	Valparaíso	11 March	The president attended Piñera's inauguration ceremony. He held bilateral meetings with Mauricio Macri, President of Argentina, and with Pedro Pablo Kuczynski, President of Peru, to discuss Mercosur and the Pacific Alliance.
14	Temer takes part in the Summit of the Americas, in April 2018.	Peru	Lima	13–14 April	The president went to Lima, where he met with the other Latin American presidents for the 8th Summit of the Americas.
15		Paraguay	Asunción	18 June	Plenary Session of the Presidents of the States Parties of Mercosur, Associated States and Special Guests.
16	Temer speaks at the CPLP Summit, in July 2018.	Cape Verde	Sal Island	17–18 July	Conference of Heads of State and Government of the CPLP.
17		Mexico	Puerto Vallarta	23–24 July	Meeting of the Heads of State of Mercosur and the Pacific Alliance.
18	Temer and BRICS leaders, in July 2018.	South Africa	Johannesburg	25–27 July	Attended the 10th Summit of Heads of State and Government of BRICS.
19	Temer and Paraguayan President Mario Abdo Benítez, in August 2018.	Paraguay	Asunción	15 August	Attended the inauguration ceremony of the new President of Paraguay.
20	Temer speaks at the United Nations General Assembly, in September 2018.	United States	New York	23–25 September	Temer took part in the General Debate of the 73rd Session of the United Nations General Assembly.
21	Temer in Guatemala City, in November 2018.	Guatemala	Guatemala City	15–16 November	The president took part in the summit of the OEI.
22	Temer and Uruguayan President Tabaré Vázquez at the Mercosur headquarters, in December 2018.	Uruguay	Montevideo	18 December	Took part in the Mercosur summit. Meeting with presidents Tabaré Vázquez, Mauricio Macri and Mario Abdo Benítez.

== Multilateral events ==
Temer attended the following multilateral events during his presidential term:

Organization	Event	Temer government (2016–2019)		
Organization	Event	2016	2017	2018
United Nations	General Assembly	20 September, (United States) New York	19 September, (United States) New York	25 September, (United States) New York
G20	G20 summit	4–5 September, (China) Hangzhou	7–8 July, (Germany) Hamburg	30 November–1 December, (Argentina) Buenos Aires
BRICS	BRICS summit	15–16 October, (India) Goa	3–5 September, (China) Xiamen	25–27 July, (South Africa) Johannesburg
OAS	Summit of the Americas	—		13–14 April, (Peru) Lima
Mercosur	Mercosur summit	—	21 July, (Argentina) Mendoza	18 June, (Paraguay) Asunción
Mercosur	Mercosur summit	—	21 December, (Brazil) Brasília	18 December, (Uruguay) Montevideo
OEI	Ibero-American Summit	28–29 October, (Colombia) Cartagena de Indias	—	15–16 November, Guatemala City
CPLP	CPLP Summit	17–18 July, (Brazil) Brasília	—	17–18 July, (Cape Verde) Sal Island
Event announced or planned. Event not planned or cancelled. Did not attend.

== See also ==
- List of international presidential trips made by Dilma Rousseff, his predecessor
- List of international presidential trips made by Jair Bolsonaro, his successor
