= Brazilians in Turkey =

Ethnic group in Turkey

Total population
- 1,050

Regions with significant populations
- Istanbul Ankara

Languages
- Brazilian Portuguese; Turkish

Religion
- Christianity; Islam; others

Brazilians in Turkey are one of the very small Brazilian communities outside Brazil, numbering about 1,050. The majority of Brazilians in Turkey work in embassies and/or consulates in Istanbul and Ankara, with a small number working in private companies in other metropolitan cities.

== See also ==
- Brazilians
- Turkish Diaspora
- Turkey-Brazil relations
- Arab Brazilians
- Ethnic groups in Turkey
