= List of ambassadors of Turkey to Brazil =

The ambassador of Turkey to Brazil is the official representative of the president and the government of the Republic of Turkey to the president and government of the Federative Republic of Brazil.

== List of ambassadors ==
Ambassador	Term start	Term end	Ref.
Saki Türkgeldi	18 July 1929	7 December 1931	
Hasan Tahsin Mayatepek	24 March 1938	2 July 1938	
Bedri Tahir Şaman	27 February 1944	20 March 1946	
İlhami Müren	20 March 1946	4 February 1947	
Hüsrev Gerede	5 February 1947	19 July 1949	
Fuat Carım	23 August 1949	13 July 1957	
Şefkati İstinyeli	28 December 1957	6 September 1960	
Ekrem Gökşin	7 September 1960	10 May 1963	
Savlet Aktuğ	11 May 1963	31 January 1964	
Mehmet Osman Dostel	31 January 1964	11 January 1966	
Savlet Aktuğ	11 January 1966	10 February 1968	
Şinasi Orel	11 February 1968	1 November 1970	
Vecdi Türel	1 December 1970	1 November 1972	
Veysel Versan	1 December 1972	21 September 1976	
Berduk Olgaçay	1 October 1976	12 July 1978	
Semih Akbil	1 September 1978	1 June 1979	
Yalçın Kurtbay	1 November 1979	1 September 1983	
Yıldırım Keskin	28 September 1983	22 November 1985	
Metin Kuştaloğlu	26 November 1985	15 November 1989	
Ergun Sav	1 December 1989	19 November 1991	
Tahsin Tarlan	4 December 1991	1 January 1996	
Doğan Alpan	1 January 1996	11 November 2000	
Sevinç Dalyanoğlu	14 November 2000	17 December 2004	
Ahmet Gürkan	27 December 2004	28 June 2009	
Ersin Erçin	17 August 2009	1 December 2013	
Hüseyin Lazip Diriöz	1 December 2013	15 November 2016	
Ali Kaya Savut	15 November 2016	15 January 2019	
Murat Yavuz Ateş	15 January 2019	25 January 2023	
Halil İbrahim Akça	1 February 2023	Present	

== See also ==
- Brazil–Turkey relations
