= Brazil–Turkey relations =

- Brazil: Turkey

Diplomatic mission
- Brazilian embassy, Ankara: Turkish embassy, Brasilia

Brazil–Turkey relations (Portuguese: Relações entre Brasil e Turquia; Turkish: Brezilya-Türkiye ilişkileri) are foreign relations between Brazil and Turkey.

Relations between Brazil and Turkey have roots that predate the foundation of the modern Republic of Turkey in 1923.

Brazil maintains an embassy in Ankara and a consulate general in Istanbul, while Turkey is represented in Brazil through its embassy in Brasília and a consulate general in São Paulo. Both countries are full members of the World Trade Organization (WTO). Brazil is Turkey's largest trading partner in South America.

== Early relations ==
The Empire of Brazil was the second state in the Americas (after the United States) to enter into treaty relations with the Ottoman Empire (predecessor of modern Turkey). On 5 February 1858, the two empires signed a Treaty of Commerce and Navigation, which had eleven articles and was similar in nature to the other Ottoman capitulations to Christian powers. Brazil set up four consulates in the Ottoman-administered cities of Cairo, Jaffa, Mansouri and Tanta. The Ottomans had two consulates in Rio de Janeiro and São Paulo. As a result of the opening of diplomatic relations and establishment of formal rules of residence for each other's subjects, over 100,000 Ottoman subjects, mainly from Syria, emigrated to Brazil, often to work on the coffee plantations. About twenty Arabic newspapers were published in Brazil for the Ottoman expatriate population from the late 19th century on. These generally took an anti-Ottoman editorial stance, putting a strain on the countries' relations. Although the First Brazilian Republic tried after 1909 to establish consulates in Constantinople (Istanbul) and Beirut, it was unable to since the Ottomans would not allow it and there was no agreement on consular reciprocity.

Brazil formally recognized the newly-established Republic of Turkey in 1926. Both signed a new treaty of friendship on 8 September 1927. In 1930 the two countries opened their respective embassies and in 1933 signed a trade agreement.

== Recent events ==
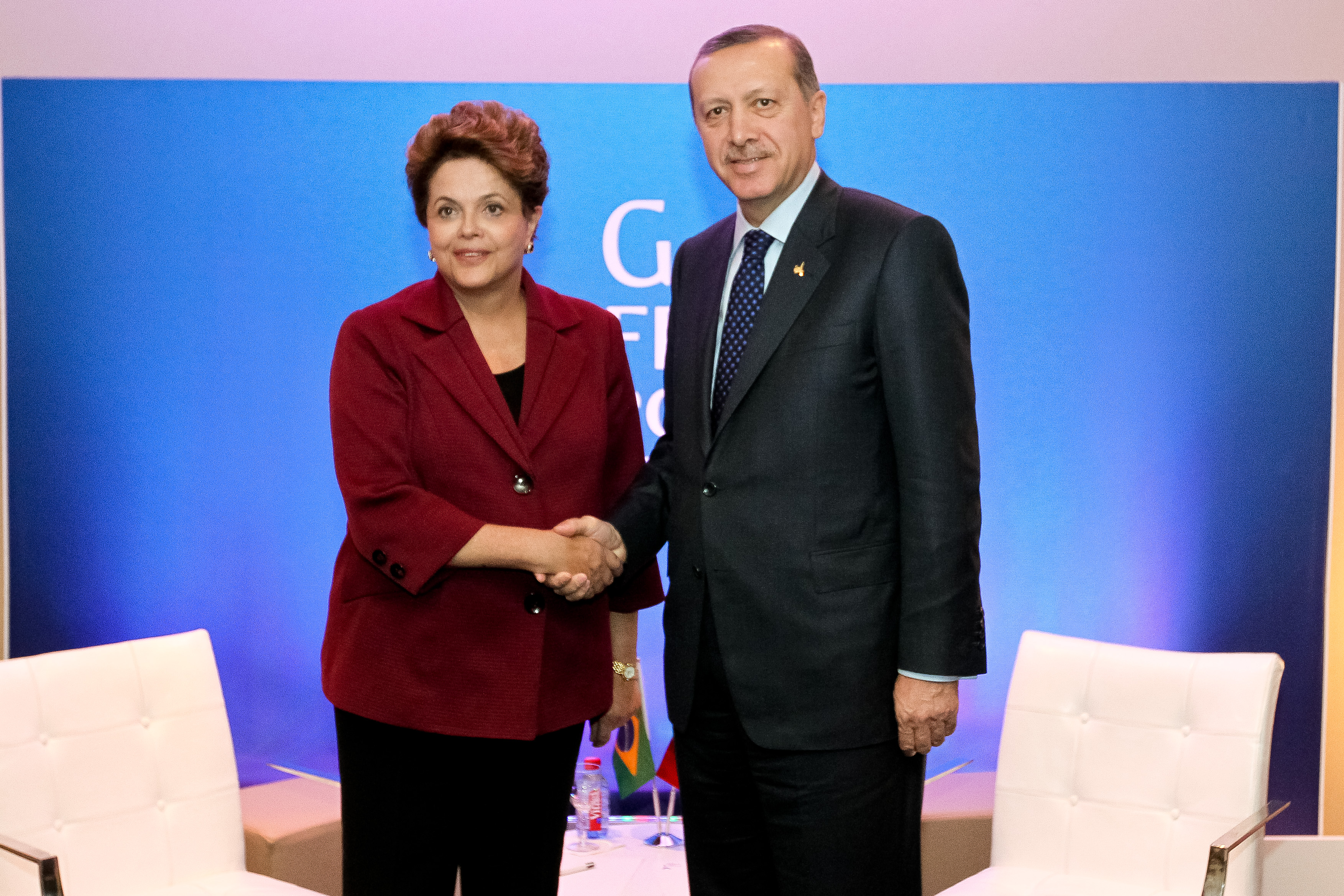
Brazilian President Dilma Rousseff and Recep Tayyip Erdoğan, 4 November 2011

In 2003 then Turkey Defense minister Vecdi Gönül paid an official visit to Brazil and met Brazilian Defense Minister José Viegas Filho. The sides signed an agreement on cooperation on defense related matters on August 14, 2003. But the agreement came into the force only in 2007.

In 2006 Foreign Minister of Turkey Abdullah Gül paid an official visit to Brazil.

In 2009 then President of Brazil Luiz Inácio Lula da Silva visited Turkey.

In 2012 former Turkish defense minister İsmet Yıldız arrival Brazil to meet Brazilian then defense minister Celso Amorim. The discussion between the two was about production of military equipment. During the visit a letter of intention was signed between two which was about the exchange of the experiences in the field of military.

In May 2010, Brazil and Turkey signed a tripartite agreement with Iran aimed at partly resolving the diplomatic crisis surrounding Iran's nuclear program.

In 2013 Brazil and Turkey established a visa agreement. Countries mutually do not require entrant visas for touristic visitors for stays no longer than three months. However, entrants with other status such as students, legal workers, and long-term visitors will have to obtain visas upon their entries.

Relations between the two countries were strained in June 2015, when Brazil recognized the Armenian genocide. Turkey recalled its ambassador to Brazil soon afterwards.

== Resident diplomatic missions ==
- Brazil has an embassy in Ankara and a consulate-general in Istanbul.
- Turkey has an embassy in Brasília and a consulate-general in São Paulo.

== See also ==
- Foreign relations of Brazil
- Foreign relations of Turkey
- List of ambassadors of Turkey to Brazil
- Brazilians in Turkey
- Turks in Brazil
