= Brazil–Cuba relations =

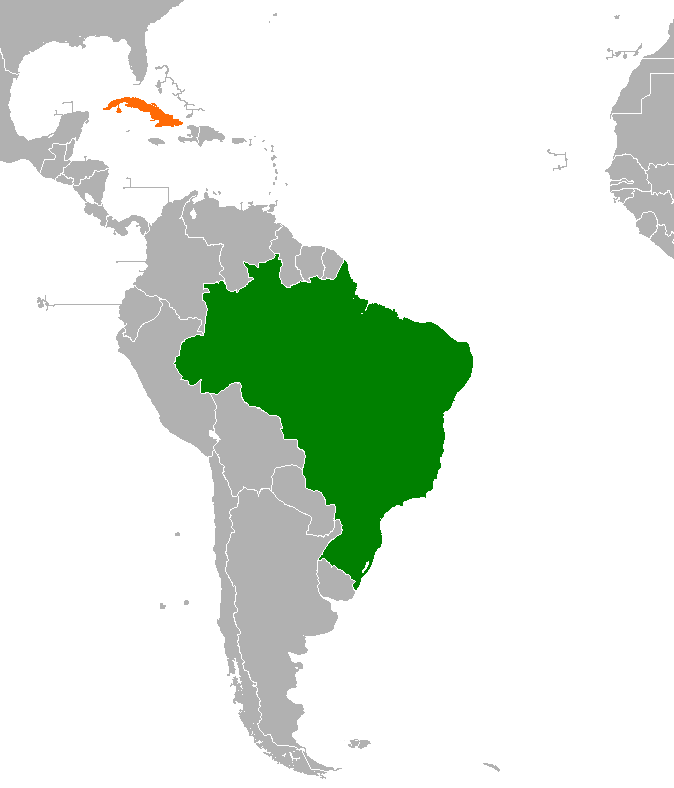

- Brazil: Cuba

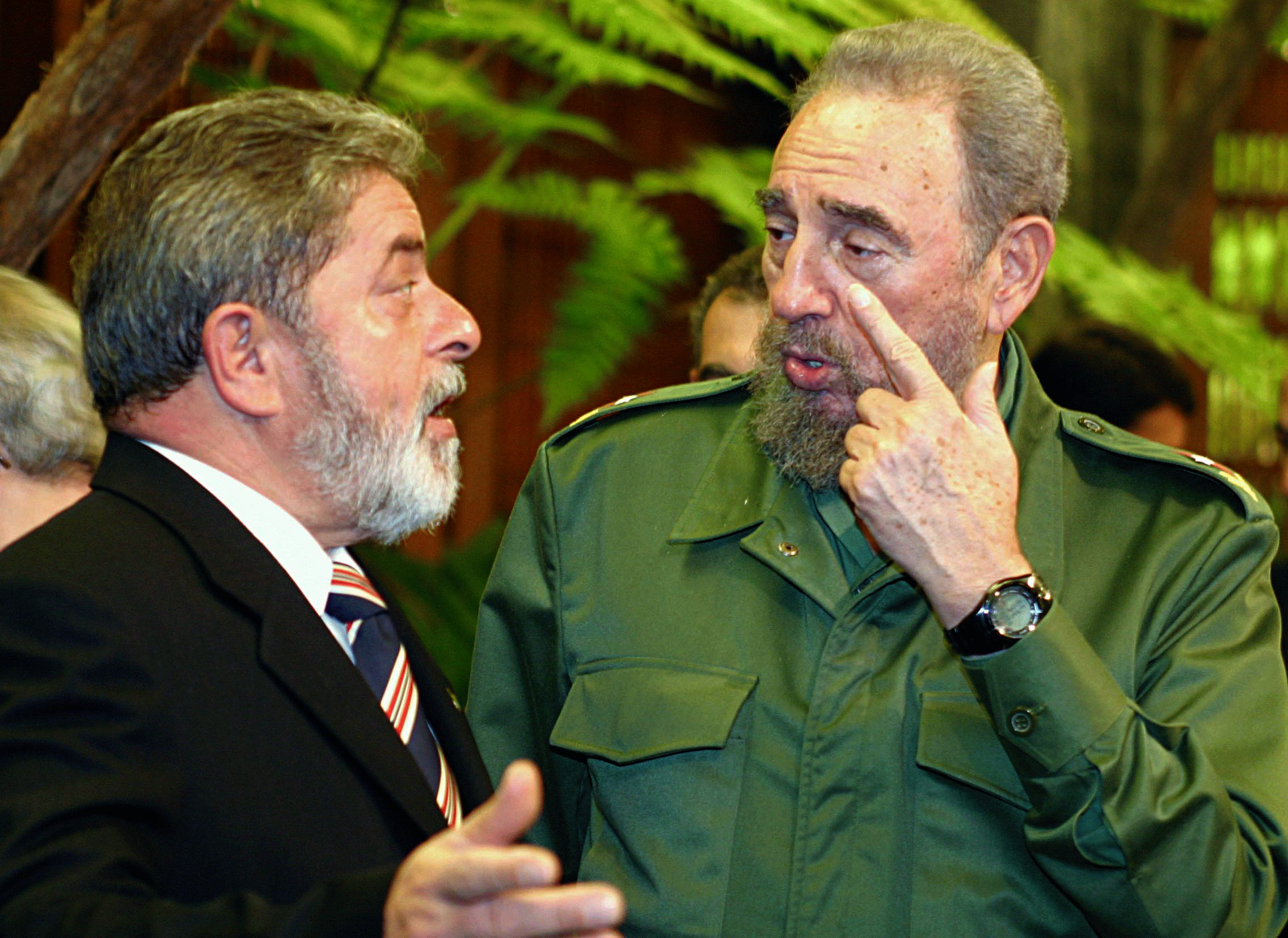
Then-Cuban President Fidel Castro and Brazilian President Lula da Silva talking in September 2003

Brazil–Cuba relations are Bilateralism and Diplomacy of the Sovereign States of Brazil and Cuba.

== History ==
After the 1964 Brazilian coup, the military regime in Brazil severed diplomatic relations with Cuba, which were only restored after Brazil's redemocratization in 1986.

Brazilian President Lula da Silva and Cuban president Fidel Castro were longtime friends. Under Lula, Brazil provided money and corporate support to Cuba. The state-controlled Brazilian oil company Petrobras studied the possibility of drilling for oil off of Cuba, while the Odebrecht construction firm headed a revamp of the Cuban port of Mariel into the island's main commercial port. Brazil's state-run Brazilian Development Bank gave $300 million to Odebrecht to build new roads, rail lines, wharves, and warehouses at Mariel. Brazil also offered Cuba up to $1 billion in credit lines to pay for Brazilian goods and services.

During a January 2008 state visit to Cuba by Lula, the Brazilian leader expressed desire for his country to be Cuba's "number one partner".

In May 2008 following a meeting of their foreign ministers, it was described as "excellent".

After the election of Jair Bolsonaro in the 2018 Brazilian general election, relations between Cuba and Brazil worsened, exemplified by the cessation of the program agreed to by the governments of Dilma Rousseff and Raúl Castro for Cuban doctors to provide medical treatment to tens of millions of poor and indigenous Brazilians. President Bolsonaro ended the Mais Medicos (More Doctors) programme, and thousands of Cuban doctors left Brazil.

In addition, in November 2019, Brazil for the first time voted against an annual United Nations resolution condemning and calling for an end to the United States' economic embargo on Cuba.

In January 2023, Luiz Inácio Lula da Silva regained Brazilian presidency. In September 2023, Lula called Cuba a "victim" of an "illegal" United States embargo against Cuba. He also denounced the inclusion of Cuba on the US list of state sponsors of terrorism.

== Resident diplomatic missions ==
- Brazil has an embassy in Havana.
- Cuba has an embassy in Brasília and a consulate-general in São Paulo.

== See also ==
- Foreign relations of Brazil
- Foreign relations of Cuba
