= Brazil–Mexico relations =

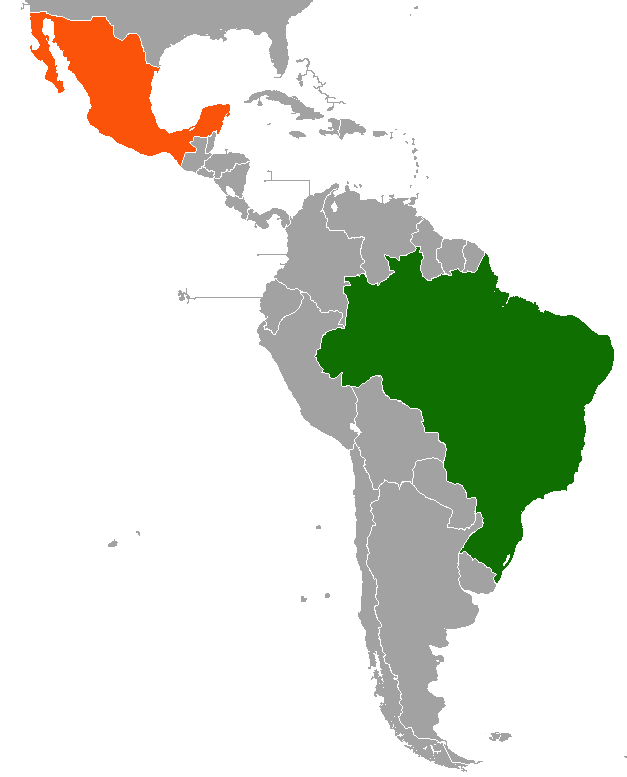

- Brazil: Mexico

The nations of Brazil and Mexico established diplomatic relations in 1825. Together, Brazil and Mexico are the most populous nations in Latin America, and both nations have the largest global emerging economies and are considered regional powers. Both countries are members of the Community of Latin American and Caribbean States, G-20 major economies, G-15 developing nations, Latin American Integration Association, Organization of American States, Organization of Ibero-American States and the United Nations.

== History ==
Brazilian President Juscelino Kubitschek and Mexican President Adolfo López Mateos, at the ceremony for the laying of the foundation stone of the new Mexican Embassy in Brasília; 1960.

The first contact between Brazil and Mexico took place in August 1824 when both nations exchanged communications through their respective diplomatic representations in London. Both nations extended mutual recognition as independent States and decided to start negotiations to establish diplomatic relations. Diplomatic relations between Brazil and Mexico were established on 9 March 1825. In 1831, both nations established resident diplomatic missions in each other's capitals respectively. During the 1860s, both nations were the only Latin American countries to be governed by monarchs; in Brazil by Emperor Pedro II and in Mexico by Emperor Maximilian I; both emperors being cousins.

In 1914, Brazil belonged to a regional group called the ABC nations (which also included Argentina and Chile). These three nations made up the richest and most influential nations in South America at the time. That year, the ABC nations intervened in a diplomatic dispute between the United States and Mexico who were on verge of war over the Tampico Affair and the subsequent occupation of Veracruz by US forces. The ABC nations met with representatives of the United States and Mexico in Niagara Falls, Canada to ease the tension between the two nations and to avoid war, which afterwards did not occur.

Between 1910 and 1920, diplomatic relations between Brazil and Mexico were severed during the Mexican Revolution. Diplomatic relations were re-reestablished in 1920 when Brazil recognized the new Mexican government. In 1922, diplomatic missions in each other's capitals were upgraded to embassies, respectively. During World War II, both Brazil and Mexico were the only two Latin American nations to declare war on the Axis powers and to send troops to fight abroad. Brazil sent an expeditionary force to fight in Italy while Mexico sent the 201st Fighter Squadron to fight in the Philippines. In 1960, President Adolfo López Mateos became the first Mexican head-of-state to pay an official visit to Brazil. The visit was reciprocated with the visit to Mexico by Brazilian President João Goulart in 1962. Since the initial visits, there have been several high-level visits by leaders of both nations.

On 1 June 2002, Mexico and Brazil signed an Economic Complementation Agreement (known as ACE 53). In accordance with the decision of Mexican President Enrique Peña Nieto and Brazilian President Dilma Rousseff in July 2015, the First Round of Negotiations of the Economic Complementation Agreement was held in Mexico City; both leaders discussed the parameters of the negotiations and improved access to markets; rules of origin and trade facilitation; international trade rules (technical barriers to trade, regulatory coherence, sanitary and phytosanitary measures, competition policy, intellectual property, public procurement); services and investment, and dispute resolution.

Both nations have worked closely in multinational forums on mutual objectives. In 2018, Mexican President Enrique Peña Nieto and CEO of Pemex, Emilio Lozoya Austin, were accused of receiving bribes from Brazilian multinational conglomerate company, Odebrecht, in one of the world's largest corruption scandals.

In April 2023, Brazil's Foreign Minister Mauro Vieira paid a visit to Mexico to participate in the V meeting of the Mexico-Brazil Binational Commission and celebrated the centenary of the opening of the Brazilian embassy in Mexico. In October 2024, President da Silva travelled to Mexico to attend the inauguration of President Claudia Sheinbaum. In November 2024, President Sheinbaum arrived to Brazil to attend the G20 Rio de Janeiro summit.

In August 2026, Mexican Foreign Secretary Roberto Velasco Álvarez paid a visit to Brazil and met with his counterpart Mauro Vieira and President Luiz Inácio Lula da Silva.

== High-level visits ==
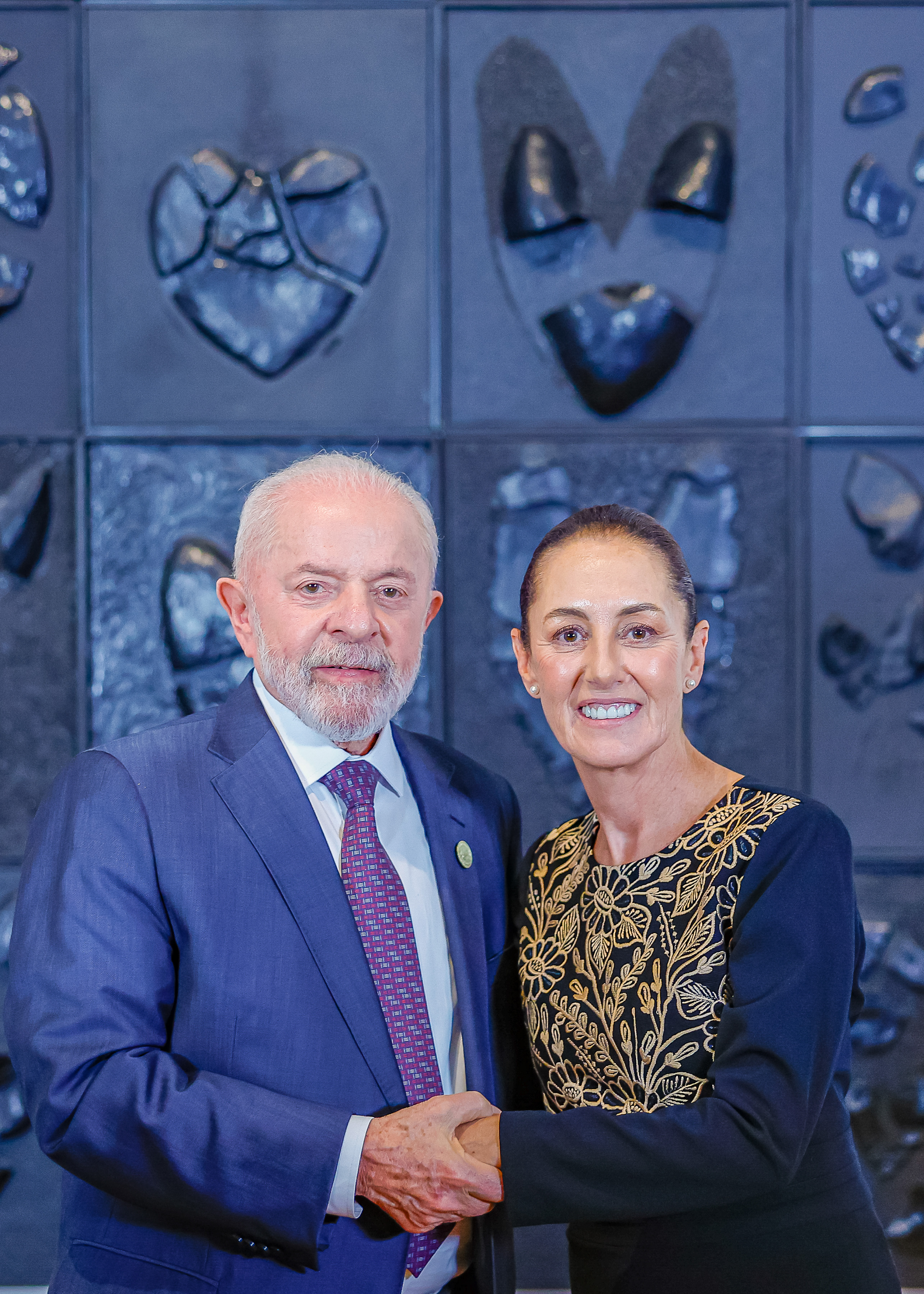
Presidents Claudia Sheinbaum and Lula da Silva in Mexico City; October 2024.

Presidential visits from Brazil to Mexico

- President João Goulart (1962)
- President Ernesto Geisel (1978)
- President João Figueiredo (1983)
- President José Sarney (1987)
- President Fernando Collor de Mello (1991)
- President Fernando Henrique Cardoso (1996, 1999, 2002)
- President Luiz Inácio Lula da Silva (2007, 2010, 2024)
- President Dilma Rousseff (2012, 2015)
- President Michel Temer (2018)

Presidential visits from Mexico to Brazil

- President Adolfo López Mateos (1960)
- President Luis Echeverría (1974)
- President José López Portillo (1980)
- President Miguel de la Madrid Hurtado (1984)
- President Carlos Salinas de Gortari (1990, 1993)
- President Ernesto Zedillo (1999)
- President Vicente Fox (2002, 2004)
- President Felipe Calderón (2009)
- President Claudia Sheinbaum (2024)

Presidents Juscelino Kubitschek and Adolfo López Mateos in Brasília; 1960.

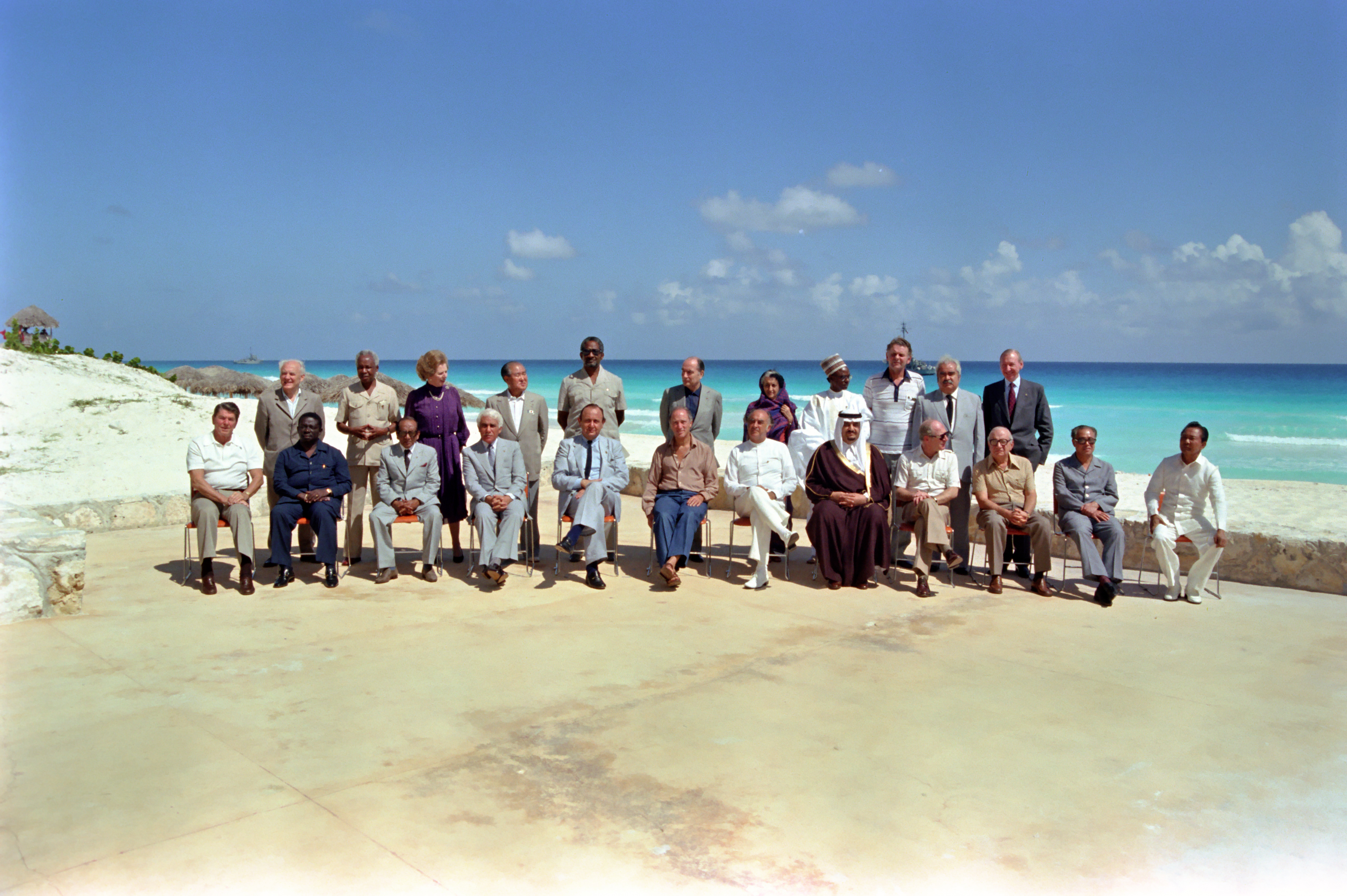
Foreign Minister Ramiro Saraiva Guerreiro attending the North–South Summit in Cancún along with Mexican President José López Portillo, 1981.

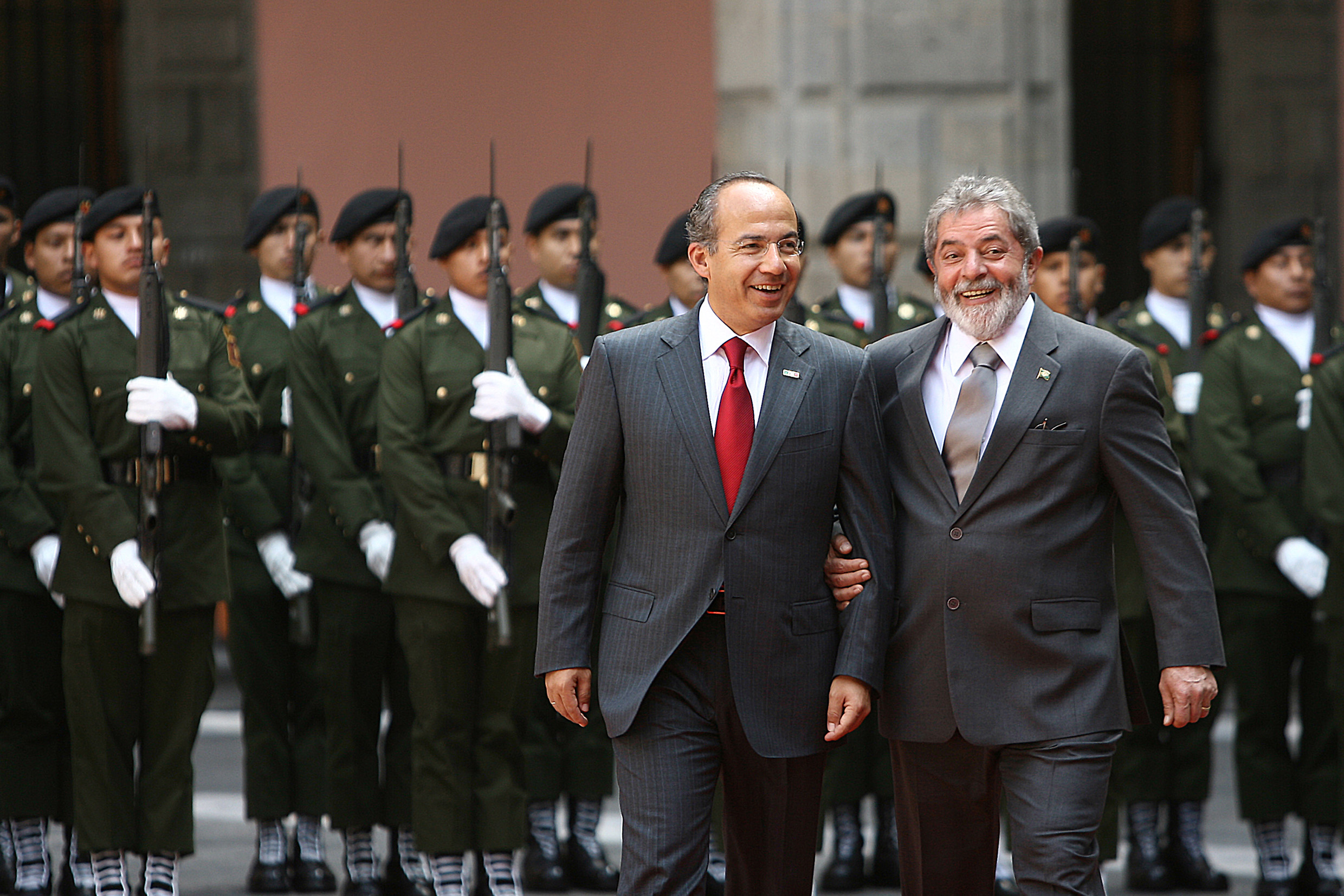
President Felipe Calderón along with President Luiz Inácio Lula da Silva in Mexico City; August 2007.

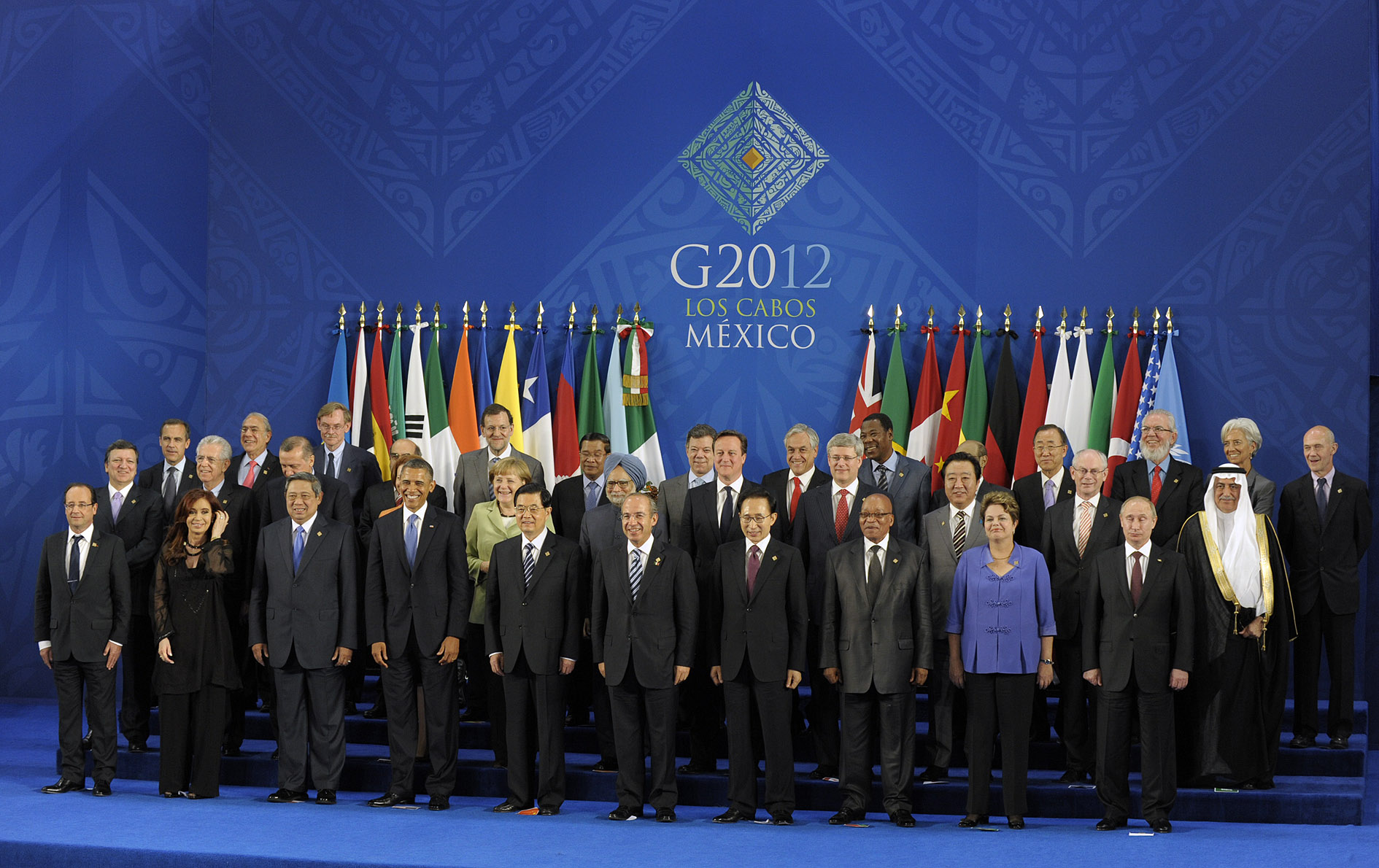
President Dilma Rousseff attending the G-20 summit in Los Cabos, Mexico; 2012.

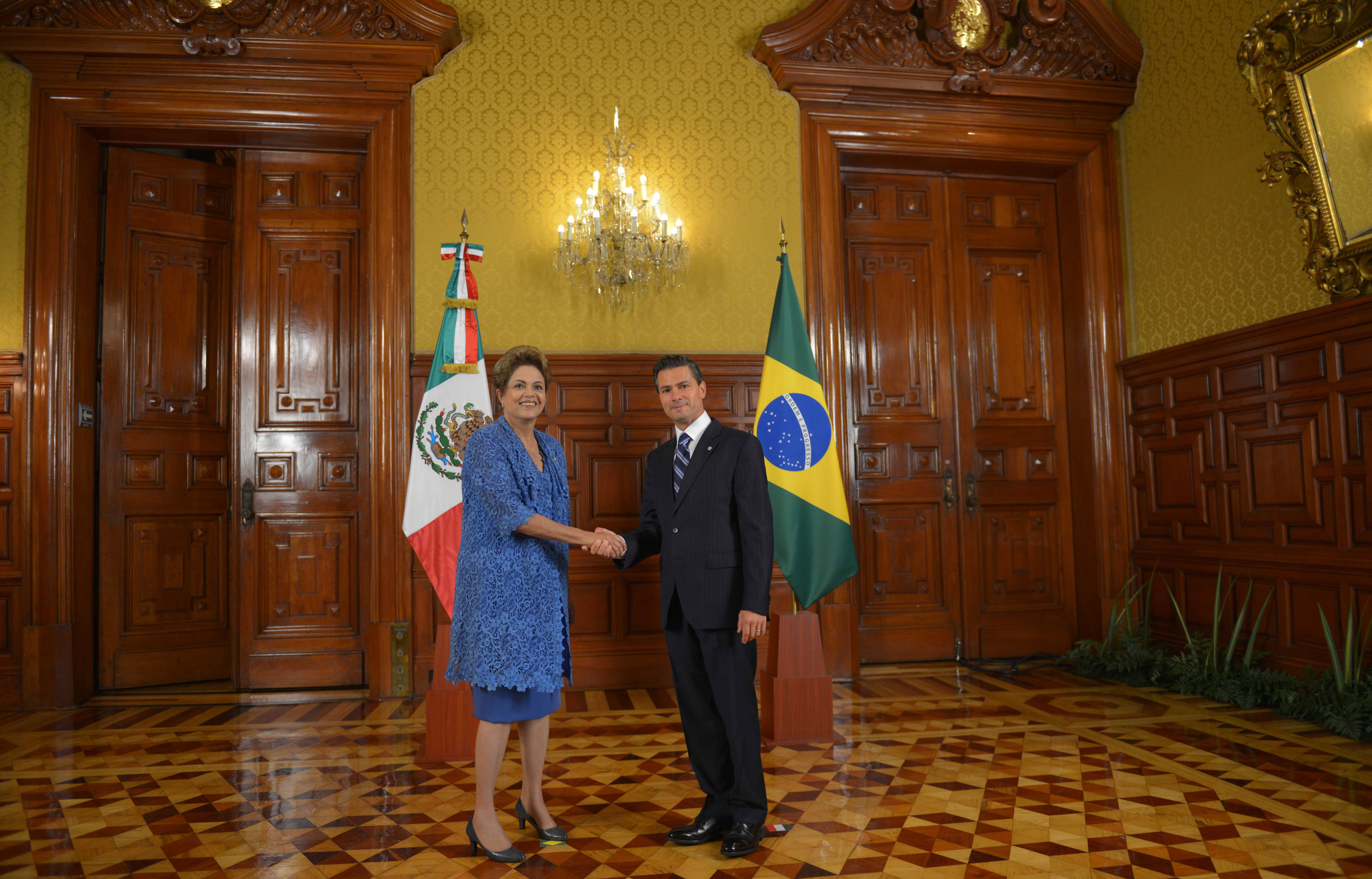
President Dilma Rousseff and President Enrique Peña Nieto in Mexico City; 2015.

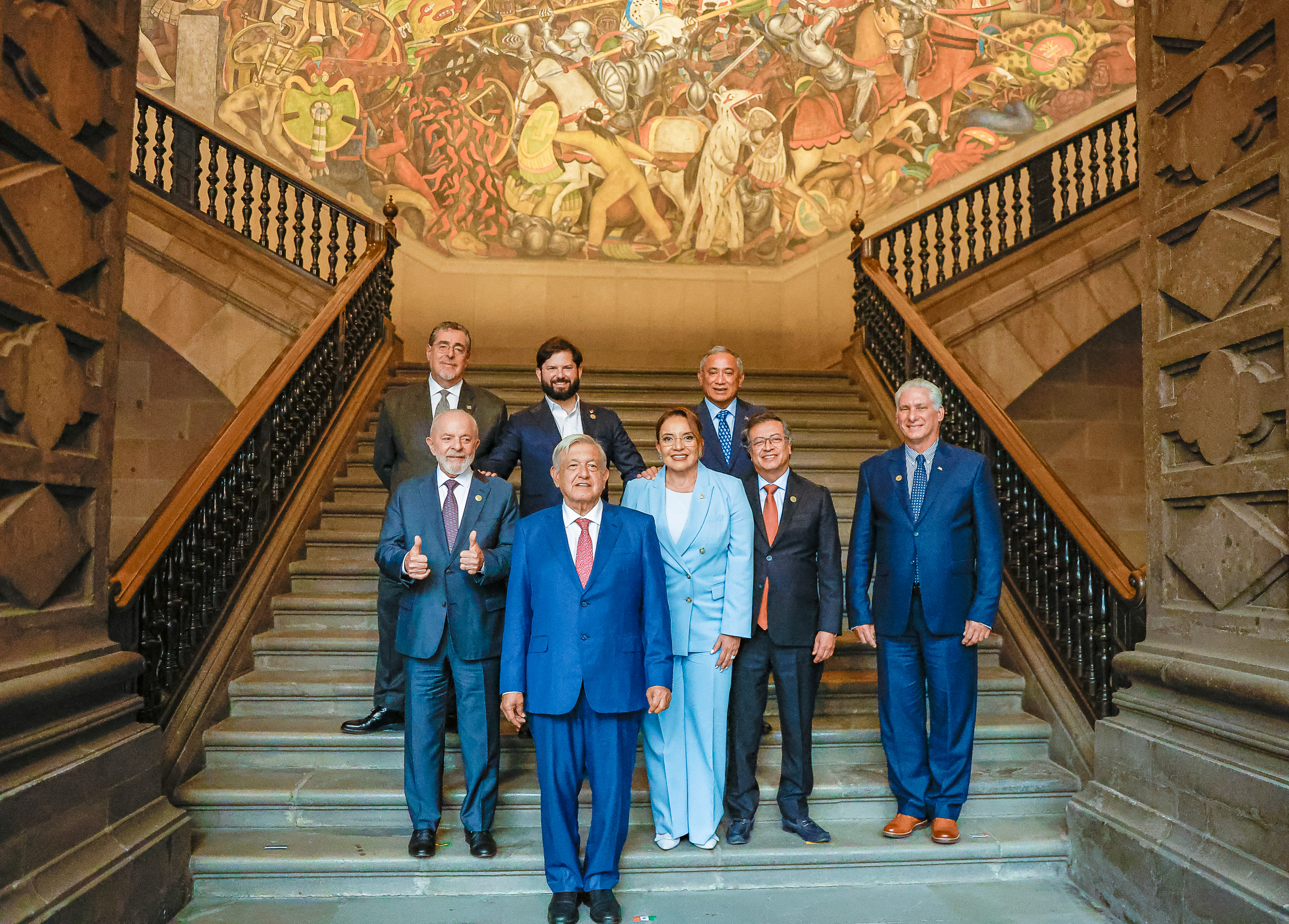
President Andrés Manuel López Obrador and President Luiz Inácio Lula da Silva (and other leaders) in Mexico City; October 2024.

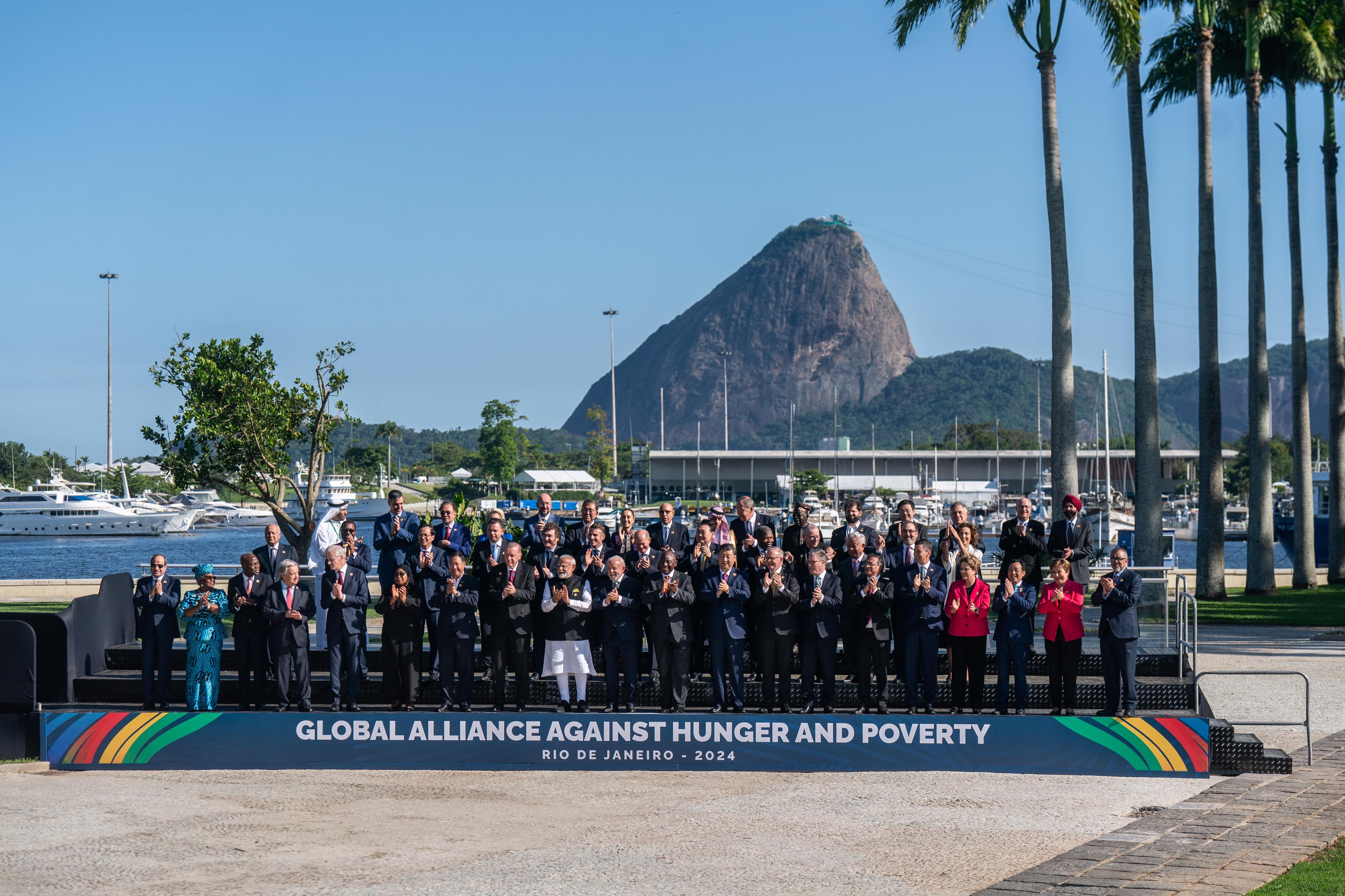
President Claudia Sheinbaum attending the G-20 Rio de Janeiro Summit; November 2024.

== Bilateral agreements ==
Both nations have signed numerous bilateral agreement such as an Arbitration Agreement (1909); Commerce Agreement (1931); Agreement for the revision of Texts for the Teaching of History and Geography (1933); Extradition Treaty (1933); Agreement for Scientific and Technical Cooperation (1974); Agreement for Touristic Cooperation (1974); Agreement on Industrial Cooperation (1979); Agreement on Cultural and Educational Cooperation (1980); Agreement of Cooperation on the Environment (1990); Agreement of Cooperation to Combat Drug Trafficking and Drug Dependency (1996); Agreement for the Establishment of a Regional Center for Teaching Space Science and Technology for Latin America and the Caribbean (1997); Agreement to Prevent Double Taxation and Prevent Tax Evasion in Tax Matters on Income (2003); Treaty of Cooperation on Mutual Legal Assistance in Criminal Matters (2007); Agreement on Air Services (2015); Agreement of Cooperation and Investment Facilitation (2015).

== Transportation ==
There are nonstop flights between both nations with the following airlines: Aeroméxico and LATAM Airlines Brasil.

== Trade relations ==
At a 2009 heads of state conference then Brazilian president Lula da Silva commented that there was "mistrust" between the two countries that needed to be overcome in order to increase trade, which he stated was a goal. He proposed further high-level talks aimed at strengthening ties between the two countries' national oil companies, Petrobras and Pemex. Mexican president Felipe Calderón stated that Mexico wanted to diversify its trade away from over-reliance on the United States and hoped to finish a free trade agreement between the two countries that has been in negotiation since 2000. Shortly after his election in 2012 Mexican president Enrique Peña Nieto criticized cuts to Brazil quotas of imported Mexican-built automobiles, and restated Mexico's interest in a free trade agreement.

In 2023, two-way trade between both nations amounted to US$16.4 billion. Brazil's main exports to Mexico include: goods for the iron and steel industry; vehicles and parts; frozen rooster and chicken offal and sulfate pulp. Mexico's main exports to Brazil include: vehicles with reciprocating piston engine; vehicle parts and terephthalic acid and its salts. Several Mexican multinational companies such as Alpek, Alsea, América Móvil, Cemex, Coppel, and Grupo Bimbo (among others) operate in Brazil. At the same time several Brazilian multinational companies such as Embraer, Marfrig, Odebrecht and Petrobras (among others) operate in Mexico.

== Resident diplomatic missions ==
of Brazil in Mexico

- Mexico City (Embassy)
- Mexico City (Consulate-General)

of Mexico in Brazil

- Brasília (Embassy)
- Rio de Janeiro (Consulate-General)
- São Paulo (Consulate-General)

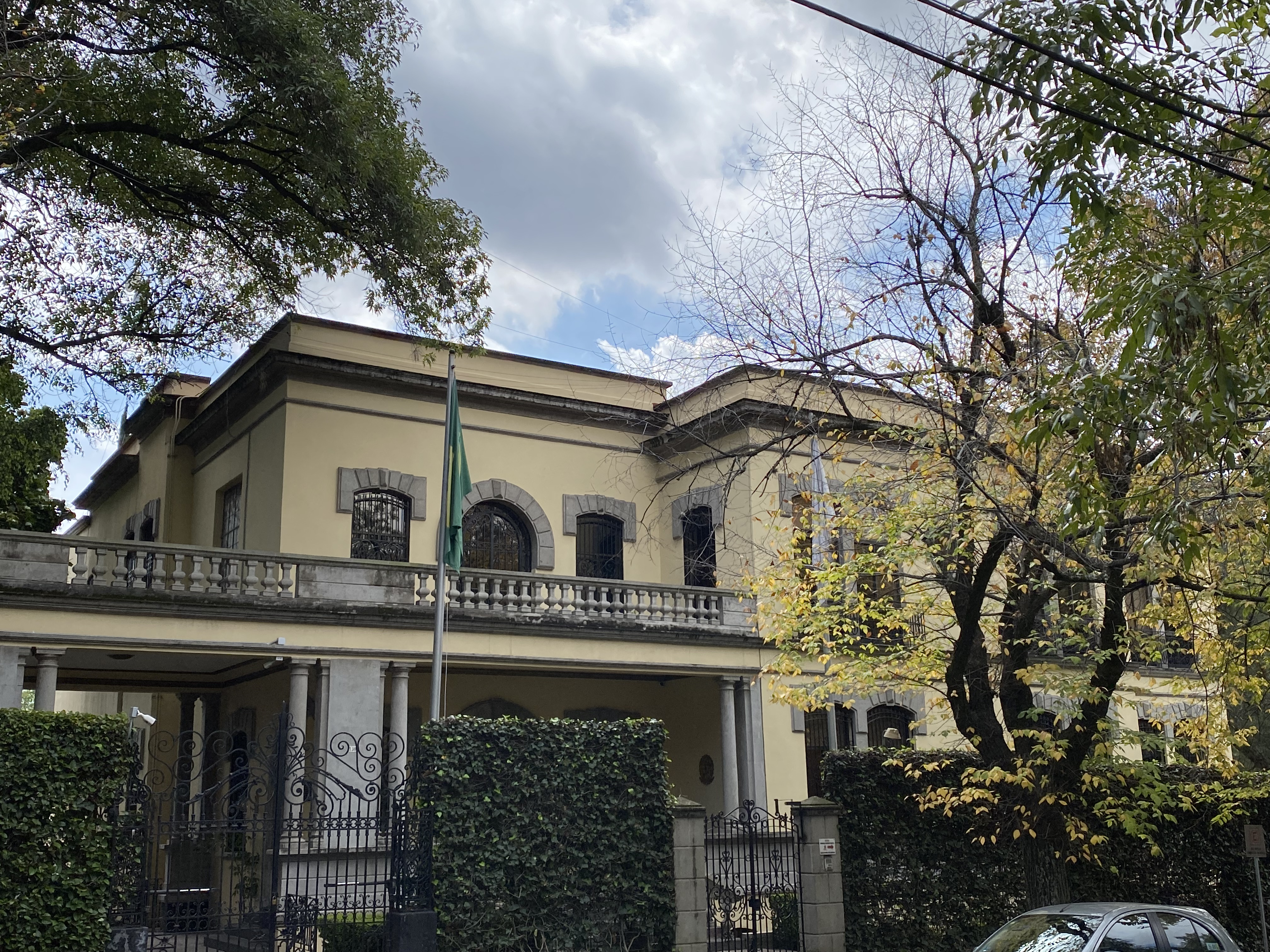
Embassy of Brazil in Mexico City

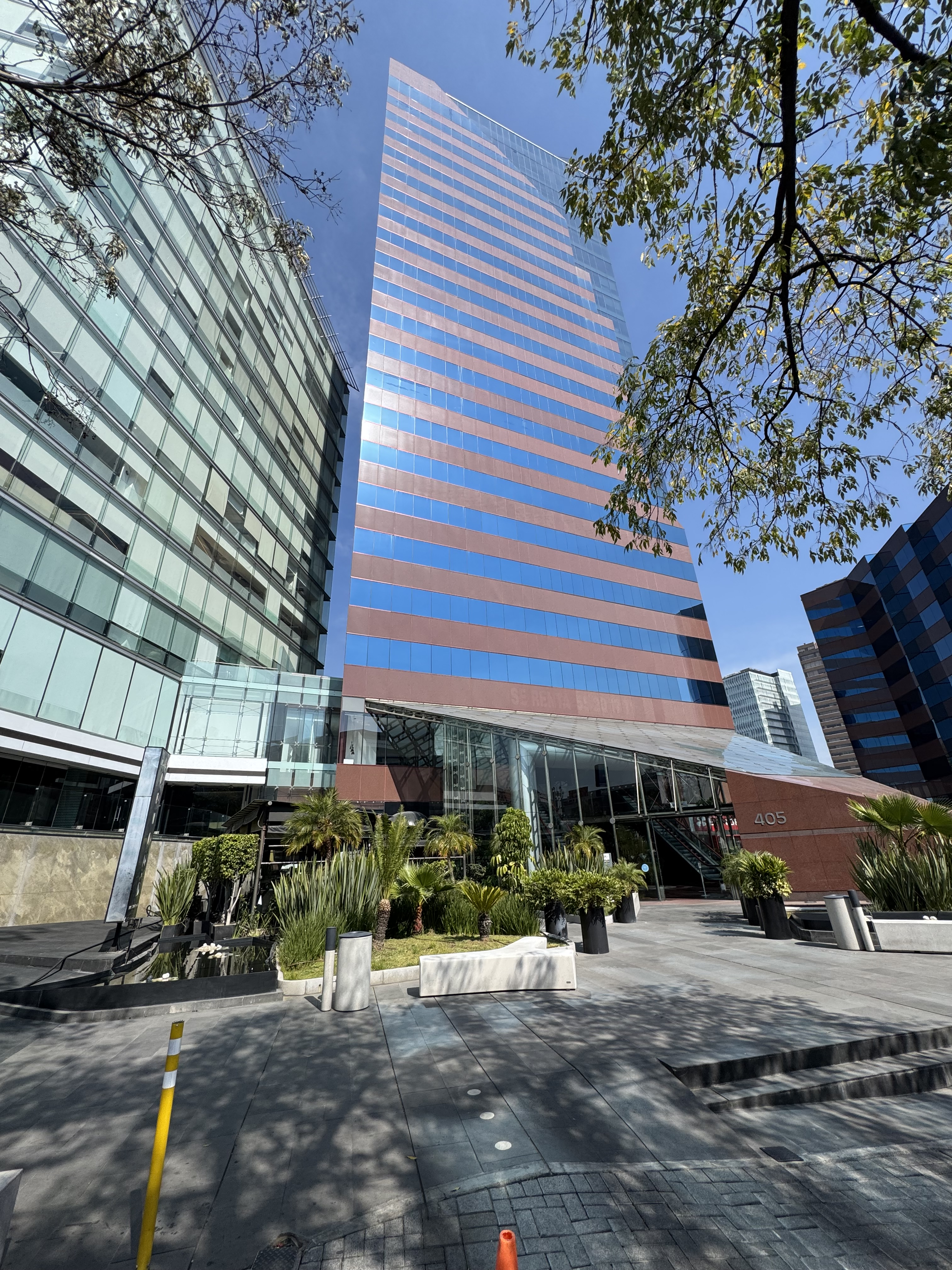
Building hosting the Consulate-General of Brazil in Mexico City
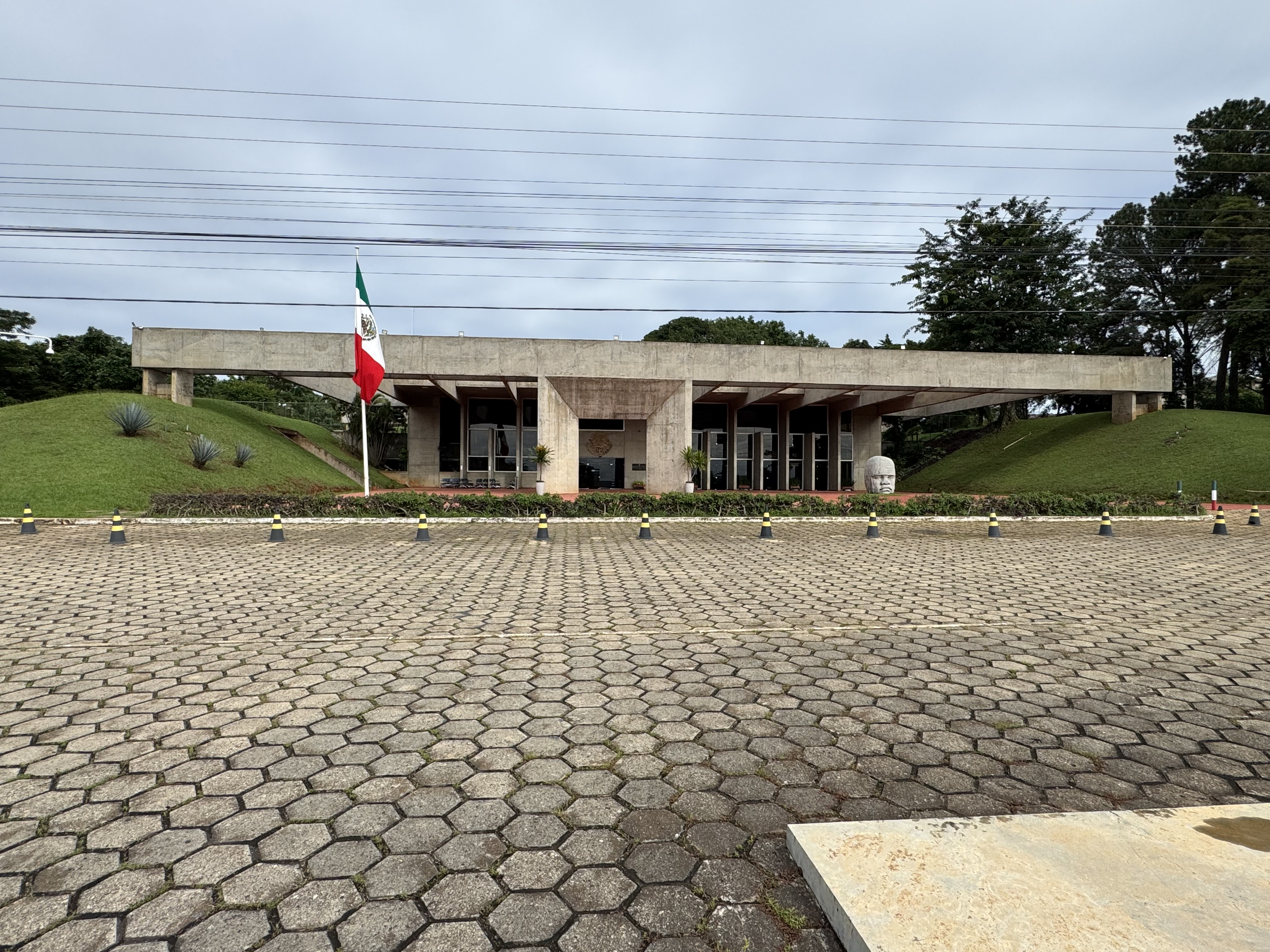
Embassy of Mexico in Brasília

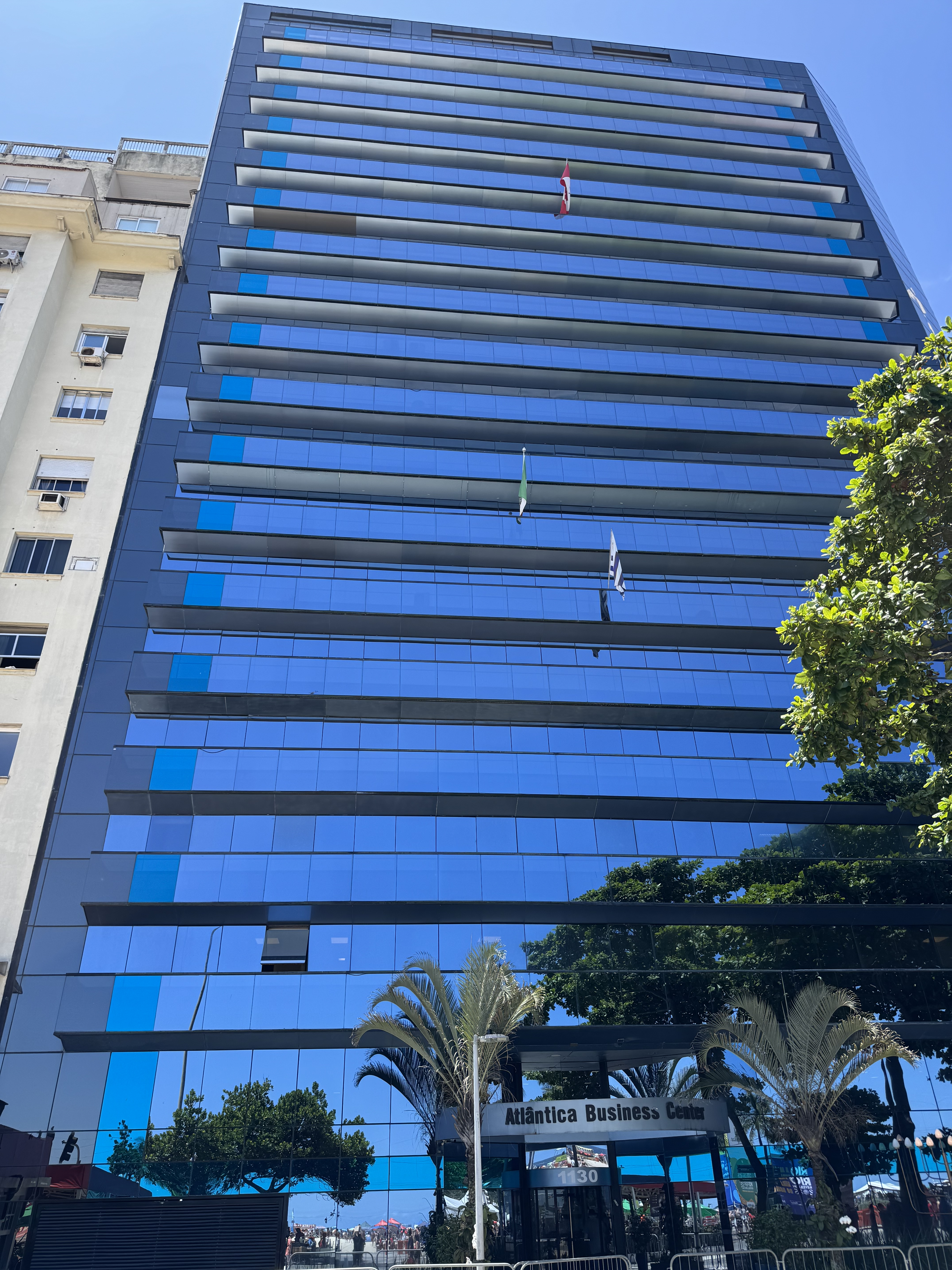
Consulate-General of Mexico in Rio de Janeiro

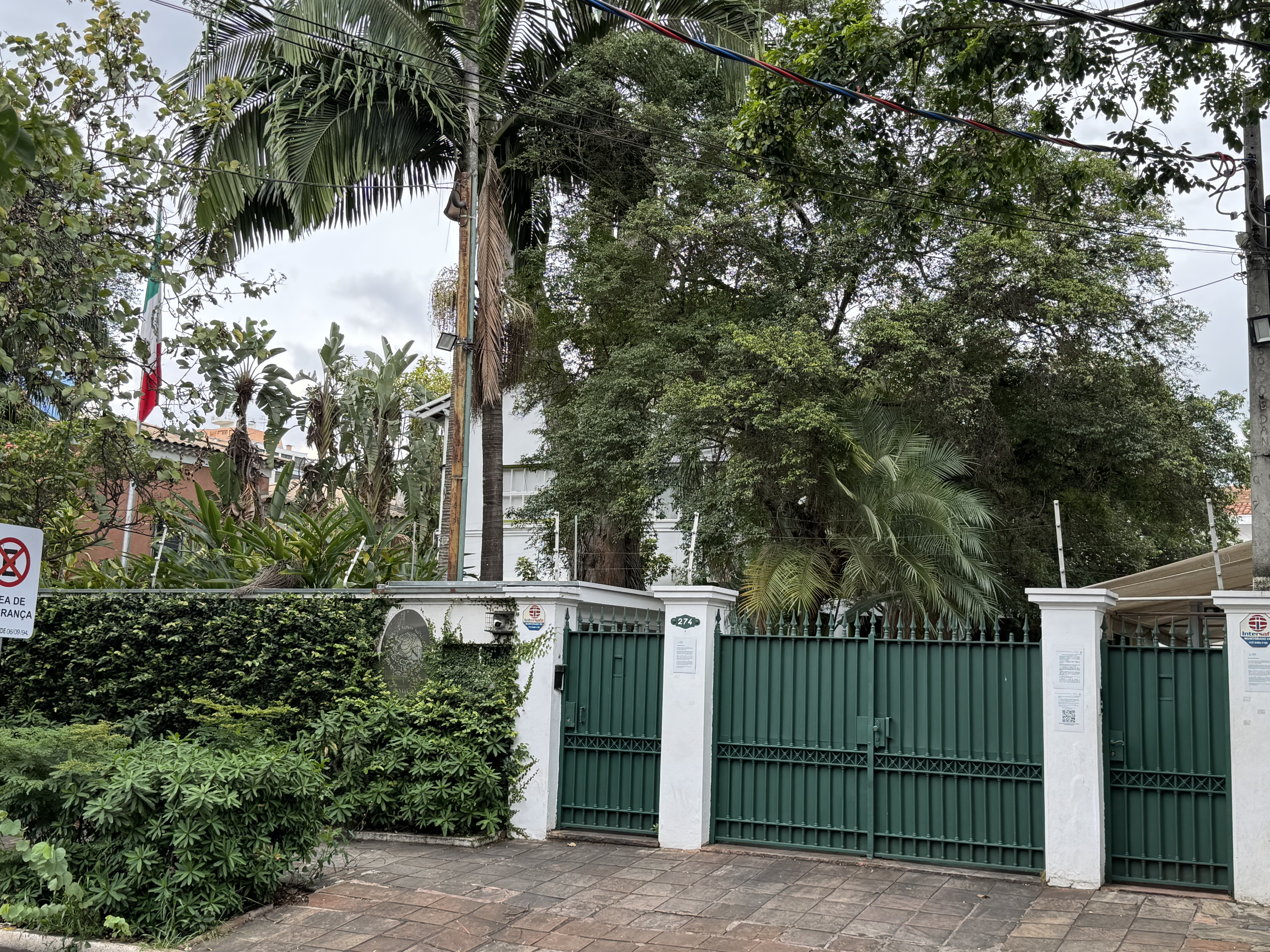
Consulate-General of Mexico in São Paulo

== Gallery ==
Flags of Mexico and Brazil at the National Palace in Mexico City

Mexican Navy training vessel, the ARM Cuauhtémoc, visiting Rio de Janeiro in 2019

The Brazilian flag flying over the former Embassy of Mexico in Lima, Peru; keeping it under its diplomatic protection in 2026

== See also ==
- Brazilian Mexicans
- Mexican Brazilians
