= Mexican Brazilians =

Mexican community in Brazil

Mexican immigration in Brazil Mexicanos en Brasil Mexicano-brasileiros
Total population
- 2,132 (2020 census)

Regions with significant populations
- São Paulo, Rio de Janeiro, Paraná, Rio Grande do Sul

Languages
- Mexican Spanish and Brazilian Portuguese

Religion
- Christianity

Related ethnic groups
- Mexican diaspora, Brazilian Mexicans

Mexican immigration in Brazil has been significant. Brazil is the Latin American country with the sixth largest Mexican presence since the end of the 20th century, with a mild climate and culture that characterizes this South American country. The Mexican population in Brazil according to official data from the Government of Mexico in 2020 was 2,132 people, most of whom are members of business and educational communities for Mexican immigrants. Unlike other destinations, most Mexicans who immigrate to the country come mainly from Mexico City, Veracruz, Nuevo León and Jalisco.

The Mexican community in Brazil is considered the third most numerous in South America and the fastest growing. Mexicans who live in the country stay temporarily (about 1 to 3 years), mainly for work, research, studies or commercial opening, which is why it is a community that is continually renewing itself.

== Notable people ==
- Giselle Itié (born 1981-), Mexican-born Brazilian actress (born in Mexico City).
- Chico Díaz (born 1959-), Mexican-born Brazilian actor (born in Mexico City), Paraguayan father.
- Rodolfo Bernardelli (1852-1931), Mexican-born Brazilian sculptor, art professor (born in Guadalajara), Italian descent.

== See also ==
- Mexicans
- Mexican diaspora
- Brazilian Mexicans
- Brazil–Mexico relations
