= Brazilian Mexicans =

Ethnic group in Mexico

Brazilian Mexicans Brasileño-Mexicanos Brasileiro-Mexicanos
Total population
- 45,000 Brazilian citizens (2020 (Number of Mexicans of Brazilian descent unknown)

Regions with significant populations
- Mexico City, Querétaro and Baja California

Languages
- Brazilian Portuguese, Mexican Spanish, Portuñol

Religion
- Christianity

Related ethnic groups
- other Brazilian diaspora

There is a Brazilian diaspora in Mexico. Although the first Portuguese-speaking immigrants in Mexico were the Portuguese, Brazilians today are the largest Portuguese-speaking community living in the country, numbering around 45,000 individuals.

== History ==
There has been a Brazilian presence in Mexico since at least 1895, when the National Census counted 91 residents. As a result of the 1964 Brazilian coup d'état, around one hundred individuals were admitted into Mexico as political refugees.

== Institutions ==
Founded in 1945 in Mexico City, the main cultural organization is the Centro Cultural Brasil-México. With more than fourteen thousand works, the center houses the largest collection of Brazilian books in Mexico. The collection grew through the donations from the Brazilian community, the Brazilian Embassy and publishers that have participated in the Guadalajara International Book Fair.

== Notable individuals ==
Football

- Luís Roberto Alves, striker
- Leandro Augusto, midfielder
- Evanivaldo Castro, forward
- Alex Fernandes, striker
- Ricardo Ferretti, midfielder, manager
- Eder Pacheco, striker
- Julio César Pinheiro, midfielder
- Flavio Rogério, defender
- Geraldo Francisco dos Santos, midfielder
- Giovani dos Santos, striker
- Jonathan dos Santos, midfielder
- José Aílton da Silva, attacking midfielder
- Lucas Silva, attacking midfielder
- Sinha, attacking midfielder, central midfielder
- Wilson Tiago, defensive midfielder
- Anselmo Vendrechovski Júnior, center back
- Edson Zwaricz, striker

Other

- Félix Bernardelli, painter
- Jaime Camil, actor
- Khotan Fernández, actor
- Giselle Itié, actress
- Metturo, singer, actor and influencer
- Santiago Lambre, show jumper
- Orlandina de Oliveira, sociologist
- Léia Scheinvar, botanist
- Diego Lopes, mixed martial artist

== See also ==
- Brazil–Mexico relations
- Mexican Brazilians
- Portuguese Mexicans
