= Félix Bernardelli =

Brazilian Mexican painter and musician

Atiliano Félix Bernardelli Thierry
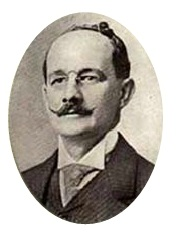
- Félix Bernardelli
- Born: 1866; Rio Grande do Sul, Brazil
- Died: 1908 (aged 41–42); Guadalajara, Mexico
- Citizenship: Mexican
- Occupations: Painter, Musician
- Known for: Teaching art in Mexico
- Relatives: Rodolfo Bernardelli (Brother, Mexican-born sculptor); Henrique Bernardelli (Brother, Chilean-born painter)

Atiliano Félix Bernardelli Thierry (1866, Rio Grande do Sul, Brazil – 1908, Guadalajara, Mexico) was a Brazilian Mexican painter and musician. He spent most of his life in Mexico teaching art. Gerardo Murillo and Roberto Montenegro were among his pupils.

== Personal life ==
He was the brother of Mexican-born sculptor Rodolfo Bernardelli and Chilean-born painter Henrique Bernardelli. He was of Italian descent.

== Selected paintings ==
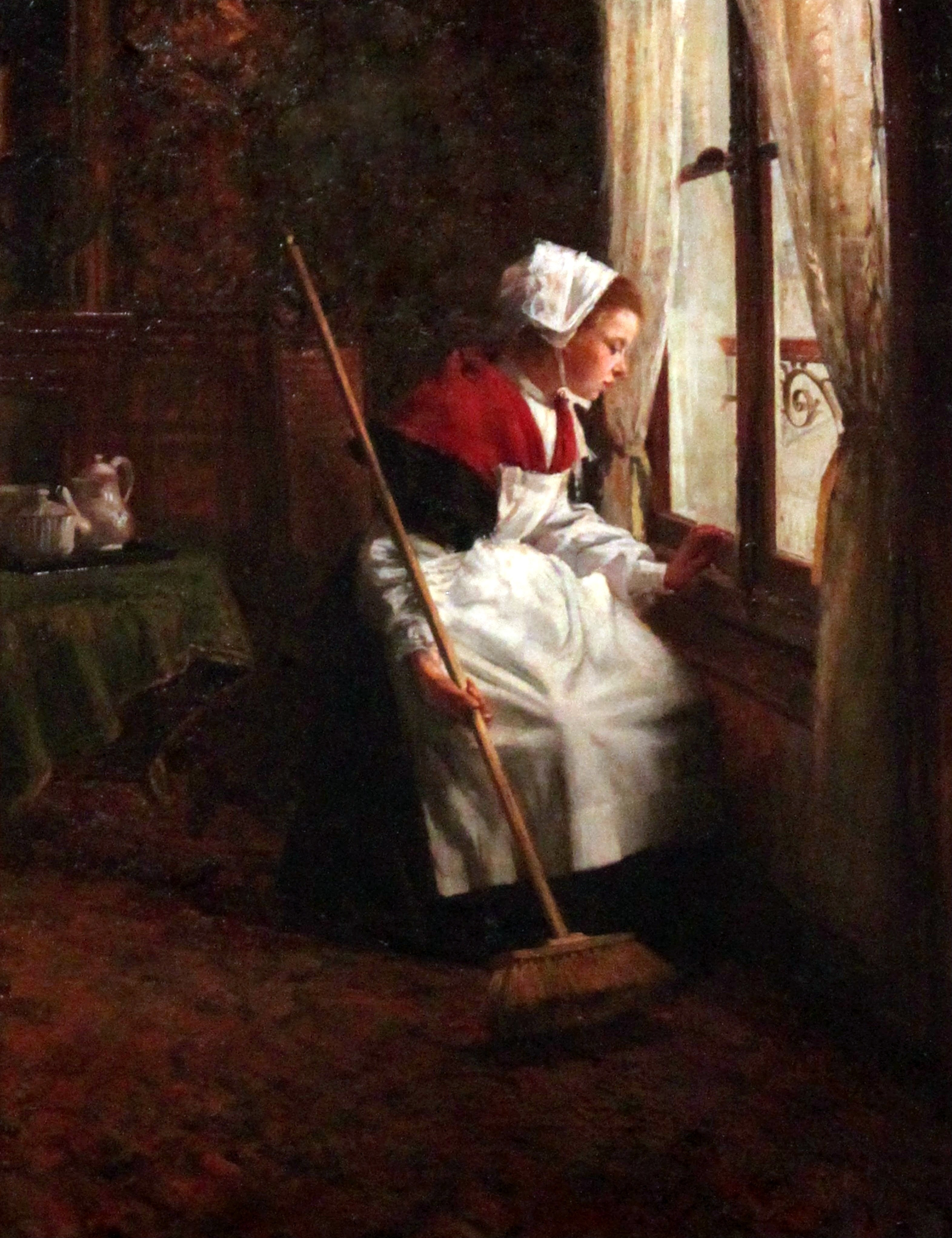
Will he pass?,
c. 1894

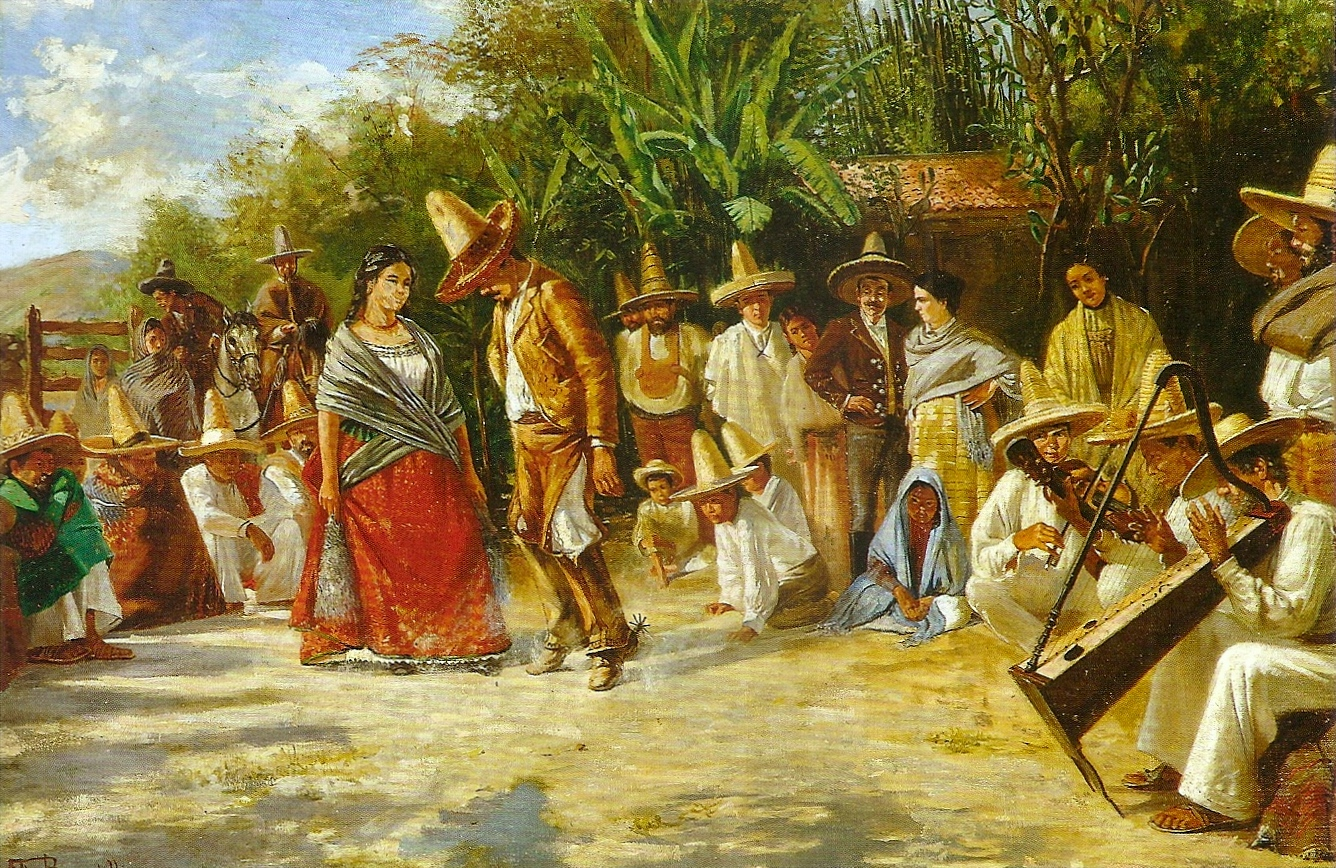
Mexican Dance, unknown date

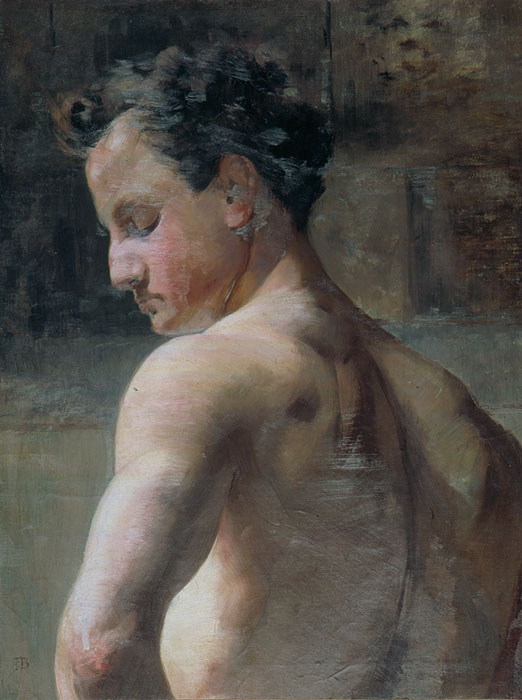
Academia, 1892

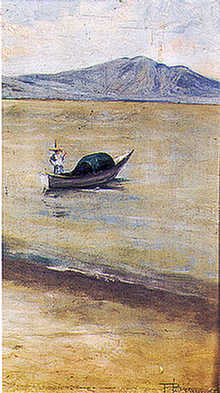
Chapala, 1899

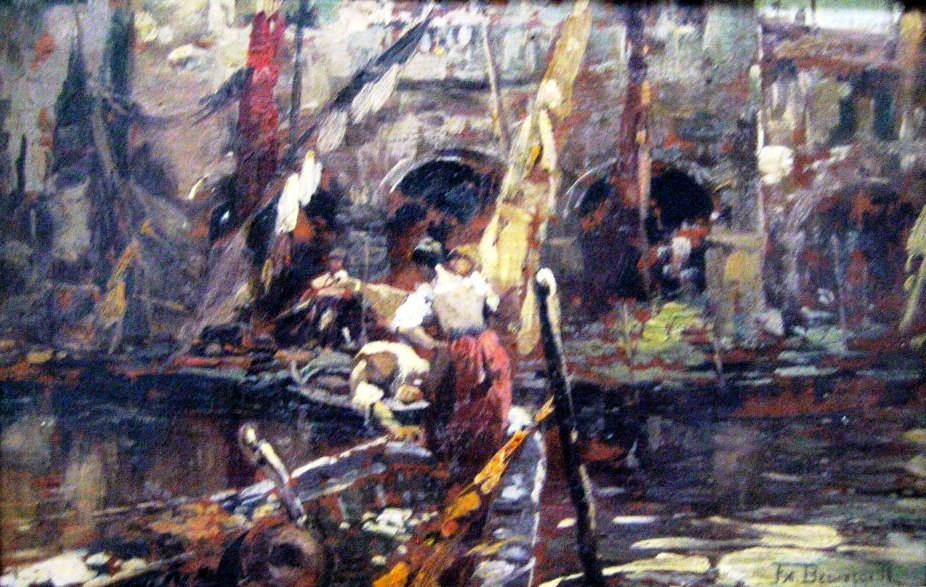
Chioggia, unknown date

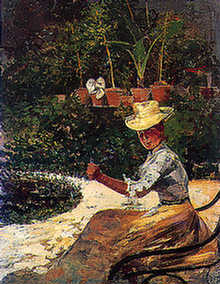
Figura en el jardín, 1900
