= Portuguese Mexicans =

Mexicans of Portuguese birth or descent

Portuguese Mexican luso-mexicano
Total population
- 1,302 Portuguese nationals in Mexico (2019); Unknown number of Mexicans of Portuguese descent

Languages
- Mexican Spanish, Portuguese, Portuñol

Religion
- Roman Catholicism, Sephardic Judaism (historically)

Related ethnic groups
- Portuguese people, Brazilian Mexicans

The Portuguese arrived in Mexico during the Spanish colonial period. Many of them were sailors, conquistadors, clergy, and members of the military. Later Portuguese arrivals included pirates in conflict with Spanish leadership. Today, the country's largest Portuguese community is concentrated in Mexico City, especially in the Colonia Condesa, home to many restaurants and bars popular with people of Portuguese origin.

== History ==
Viceroys of New Spain of Portuguese descent

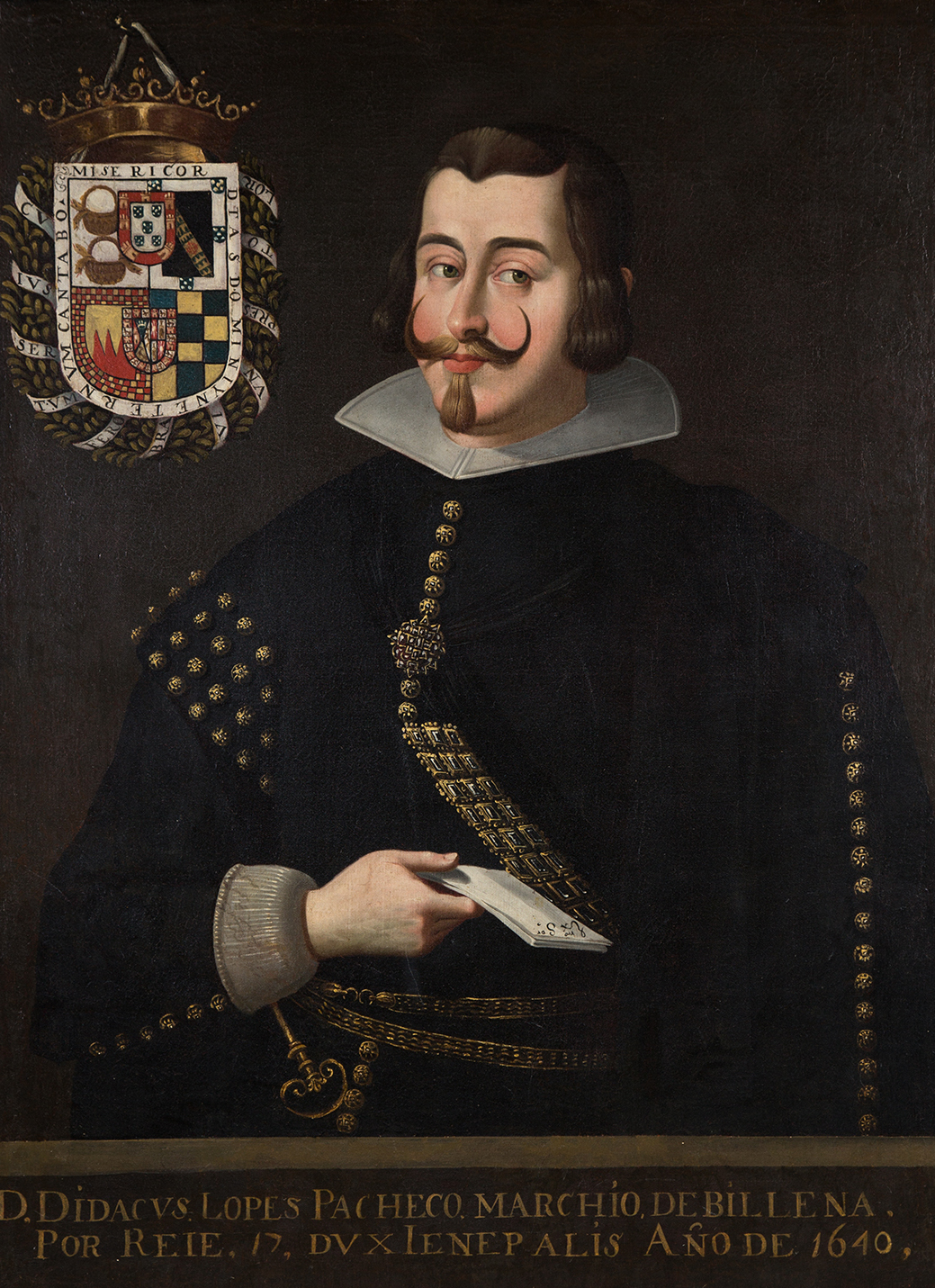
Diego López Pacheco, 7th Duke of Escalona

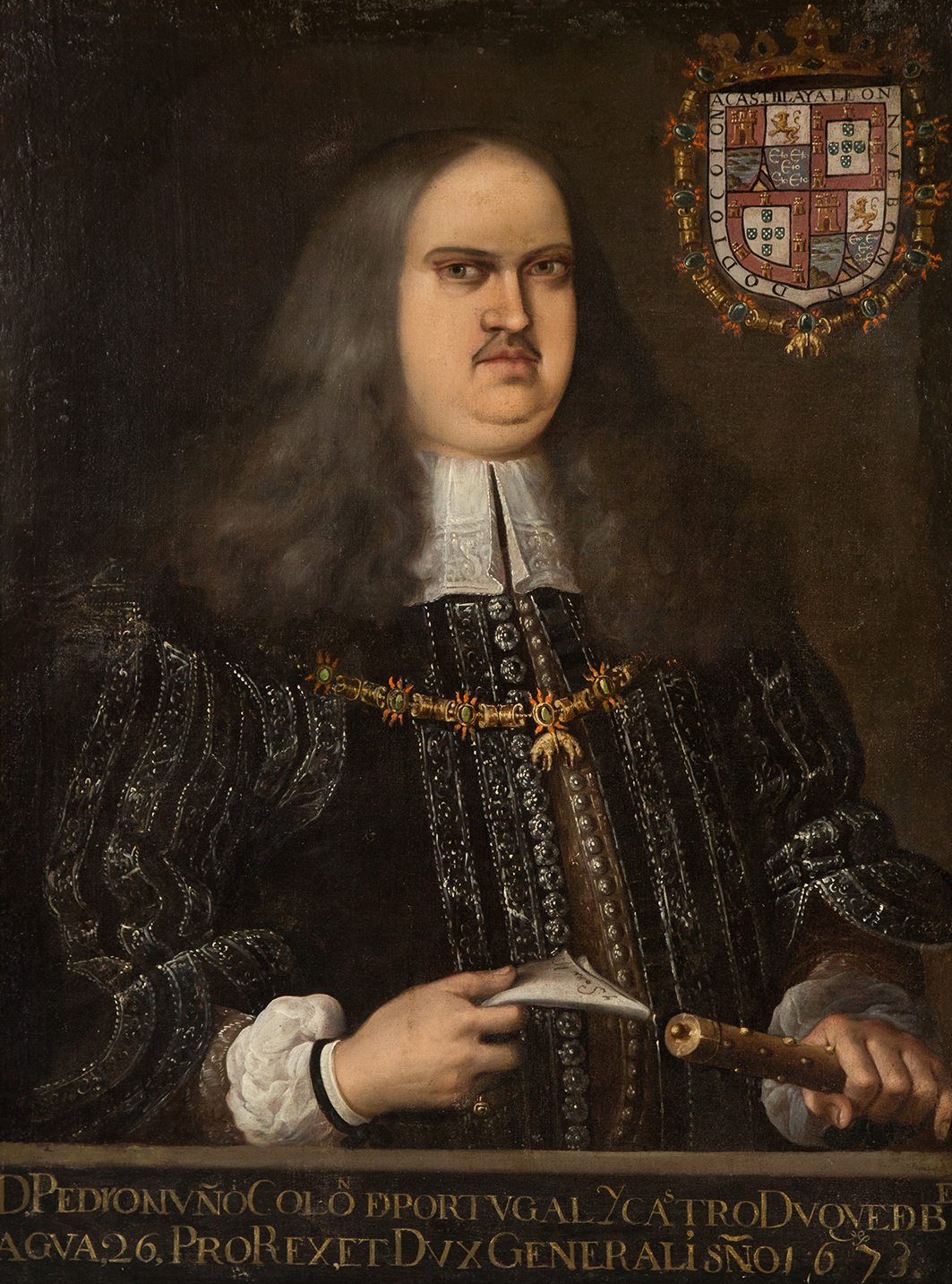
Pedro Nuño Colón de Portugal, 6th Duke of Veragua

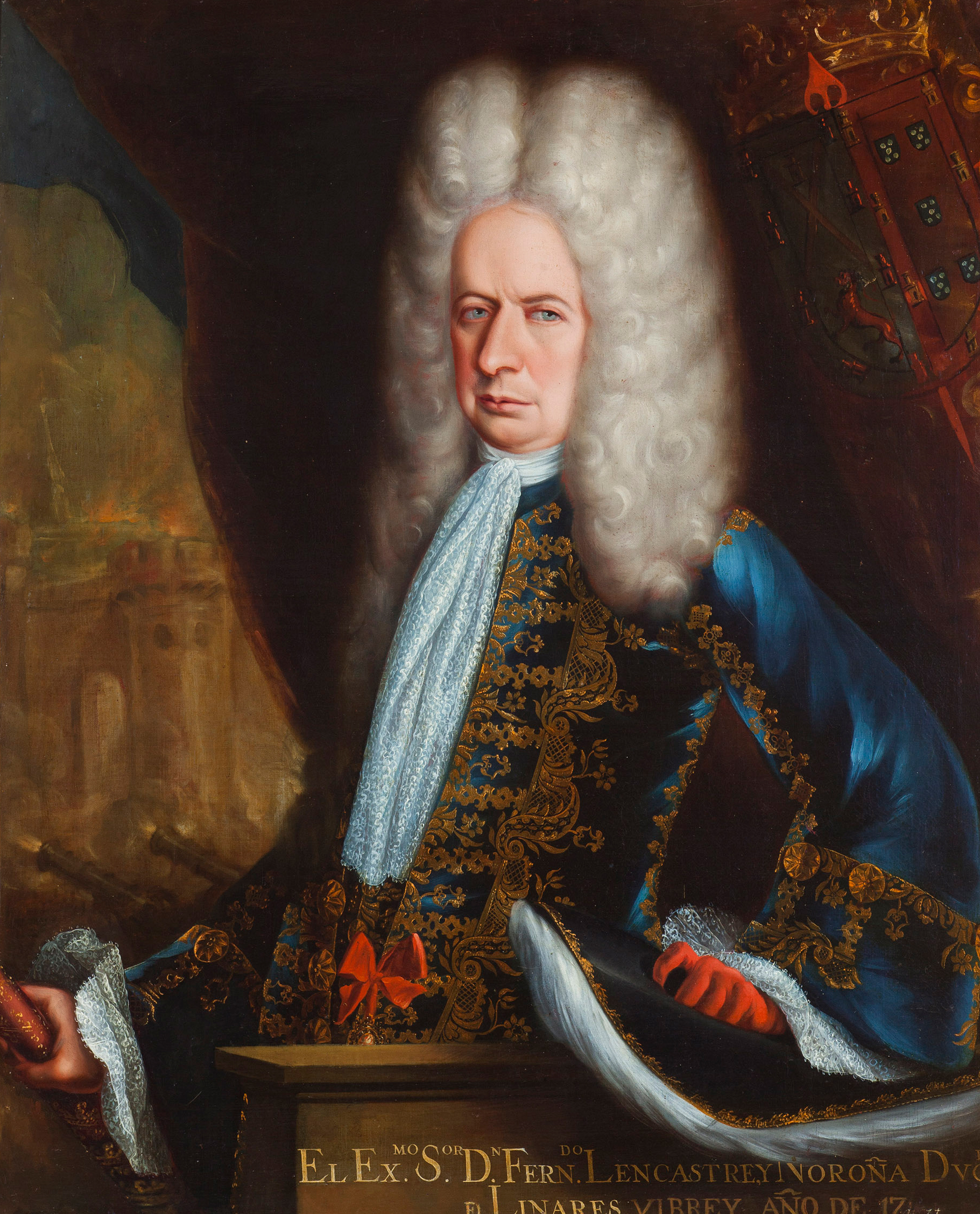
Fernando de Alencastre, 1st Duke of Linares

The first Portuguese to arrive in New Spain was Sebastián Rodríguez de Oliveira, a companion of Hernán Cortés. The Portuguese were a significant presence in New Spain, particularly during the Iberian Union. A notable portion of the immigrants were Portuguese Sephardi Jews fleeing the Spanish Inquisition.

Portuguese immigrants had no difficulty adapting into New Spanish society because they were Catholics and accountable to the Spanish Crown for taxation. During the Mexican War of Independence, Mexicans did not distinguish between Spanish and Portuguese colonists who were on the side of the Spanish Crown, many of whom were killed or expelled. Only those who wanted to remain loyal to The Spanish Crown were expelled or returned to the Iberian Peninsula, while others stayed and integrated into Mexican society remained and lost touch with the Old World.

Portuguese immigrants were granted preferential naturalization times (requiring two years of residence instead of five) in 1993. The preferential naturalization time was granted due to historical and cultural connections and was previously given to Latin Americans (1917) and Spaniards (1939).

According to the 2000 Censo General de Población y Vivienda, there were 311 Portuguese-born residents of Mexico.

== See also ==
- Mexico–Portugal relations
- Judaism in Mexico
- Peninsulares
- Spanish Mexican
- Geographic distribution of Portuguese
- Portuguese diaspora
