= Mexico–Portugal relations =

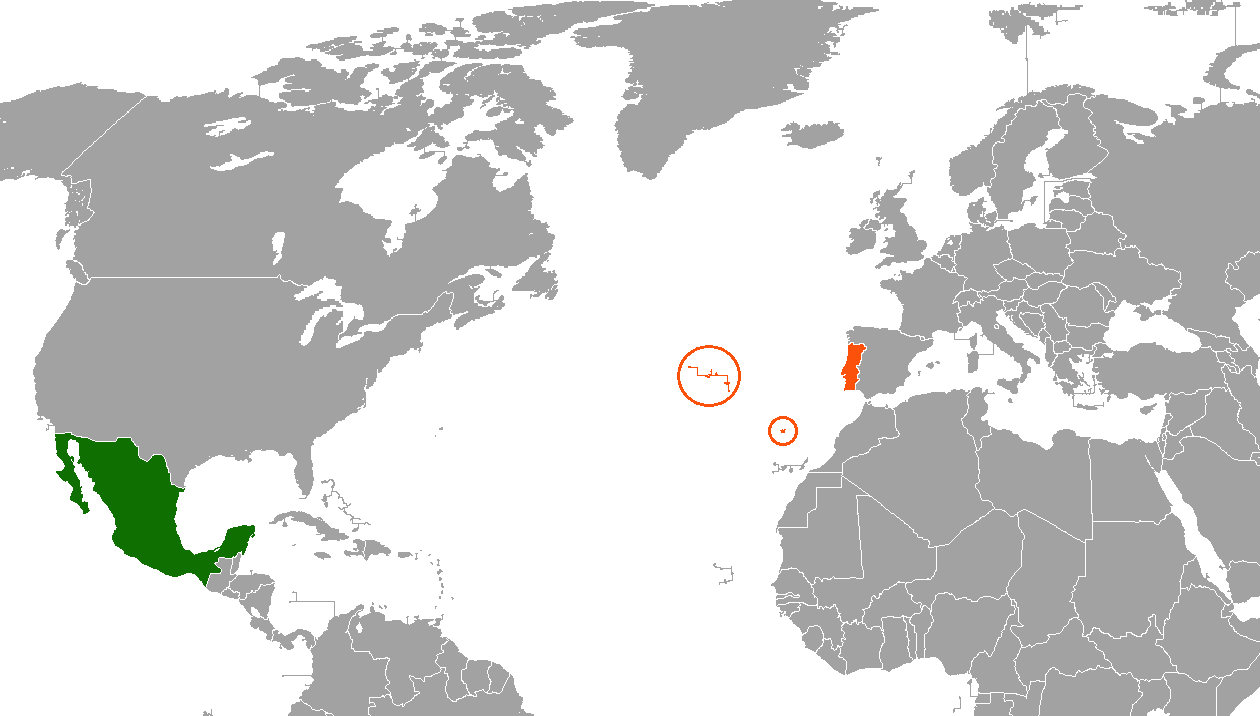

- Mexico: Portugal

The nations of Mexico and Portugal established diplomatic relations in 1864. Both nations are members of the Organization of Ibero-American States, Organisation for Economic Co-operation and Development and the United Nations.

== History ==
The first official diplomatic contacts between Mexico and Portugal took place in 1843 in when ambassadors of both nations met in Washington, D.C., United States. Diplomatic relations were not established officially until 20 October 1864 under the government of Emperor Maximilian I of Mexico. Portugal, however, broke diplomatic relations with Mexico in 1867 after the assassination of the Emperor. Relations were not reinstated until 1879.

In 1884, Mexico opened its first diplomatic mission in Lisbon; however, the mission was closed in 1918 when Portugal refused to recognize the government of Mexican President Venustiano Carranza. Diplomatic relations were restored once again between the two nations in 1929. In 1959, diplomatic missions were opened in Lisbon and in Mexico City, respectively, and were elevated to the level of embassies.

In January 1990, President Carlos Salinas de Gortari became the first Mexican head of state to visit Portugal. In July 1991, Portuguese Prime Minister Aníbal Cavaco Silva and President Mario Soares visited the city of Guadalajara, Mexico to attend the first Ibero-American Summit. In October 2013, Portuguese Prime Minister Pedro Passos Coelho visited Mexico on an official state visit. In June 2014, Mexican President Enrique Peña Nieto visited Portugal on a state visit to commemorate the 150 years of diplomatic relations between both nations.

On 17 July 2017, Portuguese President Marcelo Rebelo de Sousa paid a state visit to Mexico and was received by President Enrique Peña Nieto. During the meeting, both Presidents agreed to boost Portuguese investment in Mexico and for Mexican companies to increase their presence and export products to Portugal. Both leaders also agreed to promote tourism and to encourage bilateral cooperation in science and technology.

In February 2024, Mexico signed an agreement with Portugal, and in particular the Coimbra region in an effort to promote business opportunities and encouraging trade and investment between both nations. That same year, both nations celebrated 160 years of diplomatic relations.

== High-level visits ==
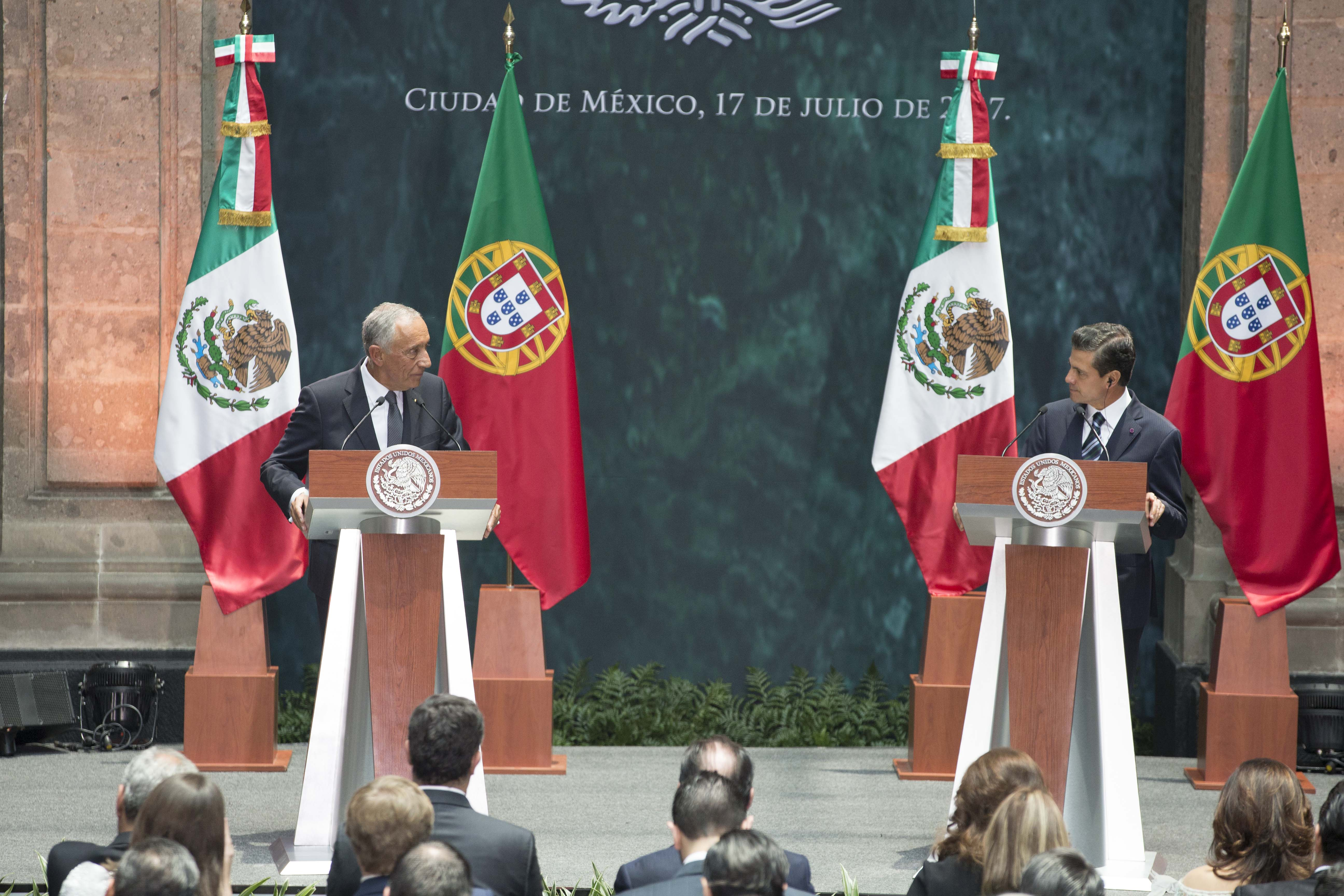
President Marcelo Rebelo de Sousa and President Enrique Peña Nieto in Mexico City, July 2017.

High-level visits from Mexico to Portugal

- President Carlos Salinas de Gortari (1990)
- President Ernesto Zedillo (1998, 2000)
- President Felipe Calderón (2009)
- President Enrique Peña Nieto (2014)

High-level visits from Portugal to Mexico

- President Mario Soares (1991)
- Prime Minister Aníbal Cavaco Silva (1991)
- Prime Minister António Guterres (1996)
- President Jorge Sampaio (1999)
- Prime Minister Pedro Passos Coelho (2013)
- President Aníbal Cavaco Silva (1991)
- President Marcelo Rebelo de Sousa (2017)
- Prime Minister António Costa (2018)

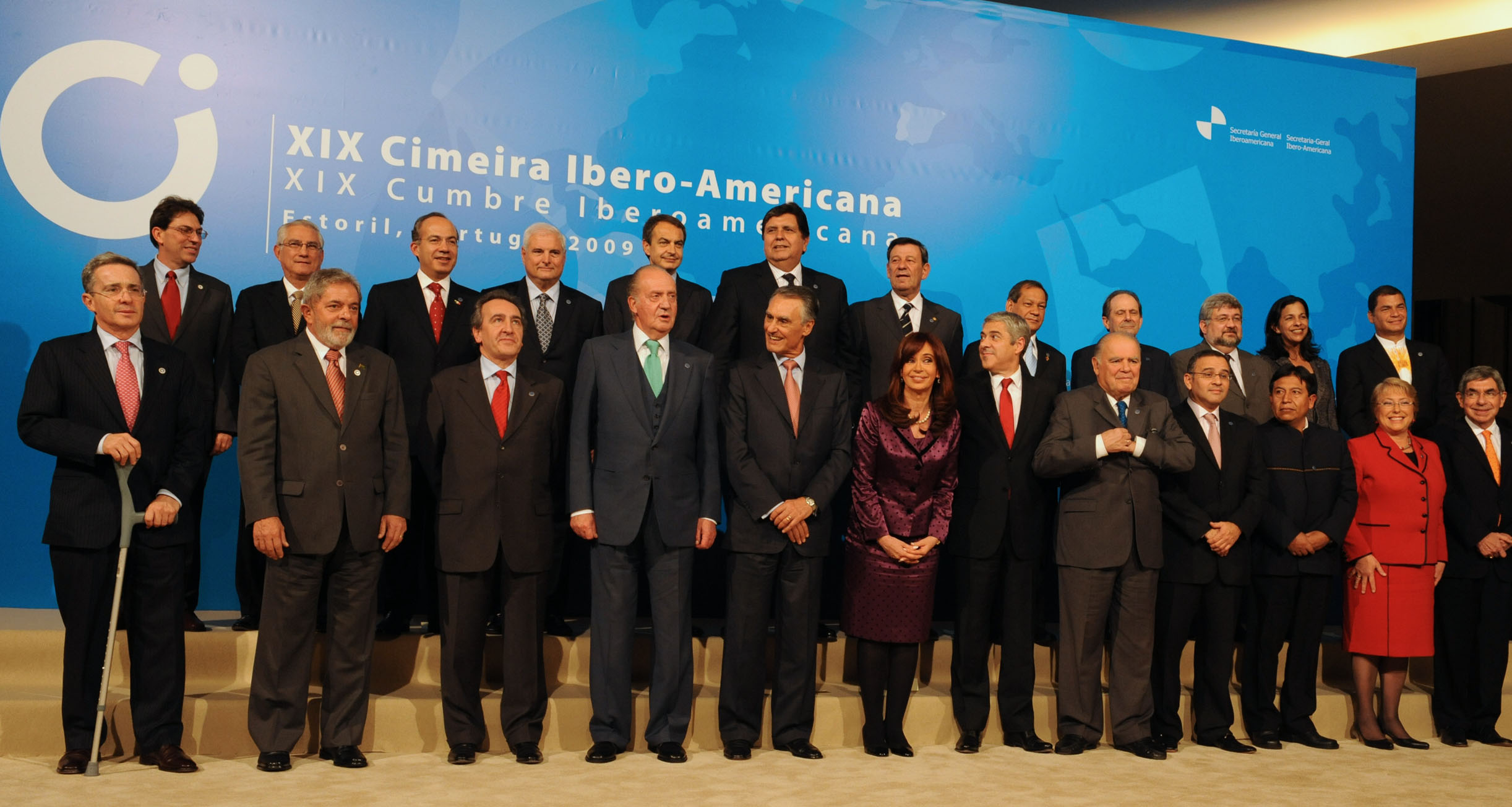
President Aníbal Cavaco Silva and President Felipe Calderón in Estoril, Portugal; November 2009.

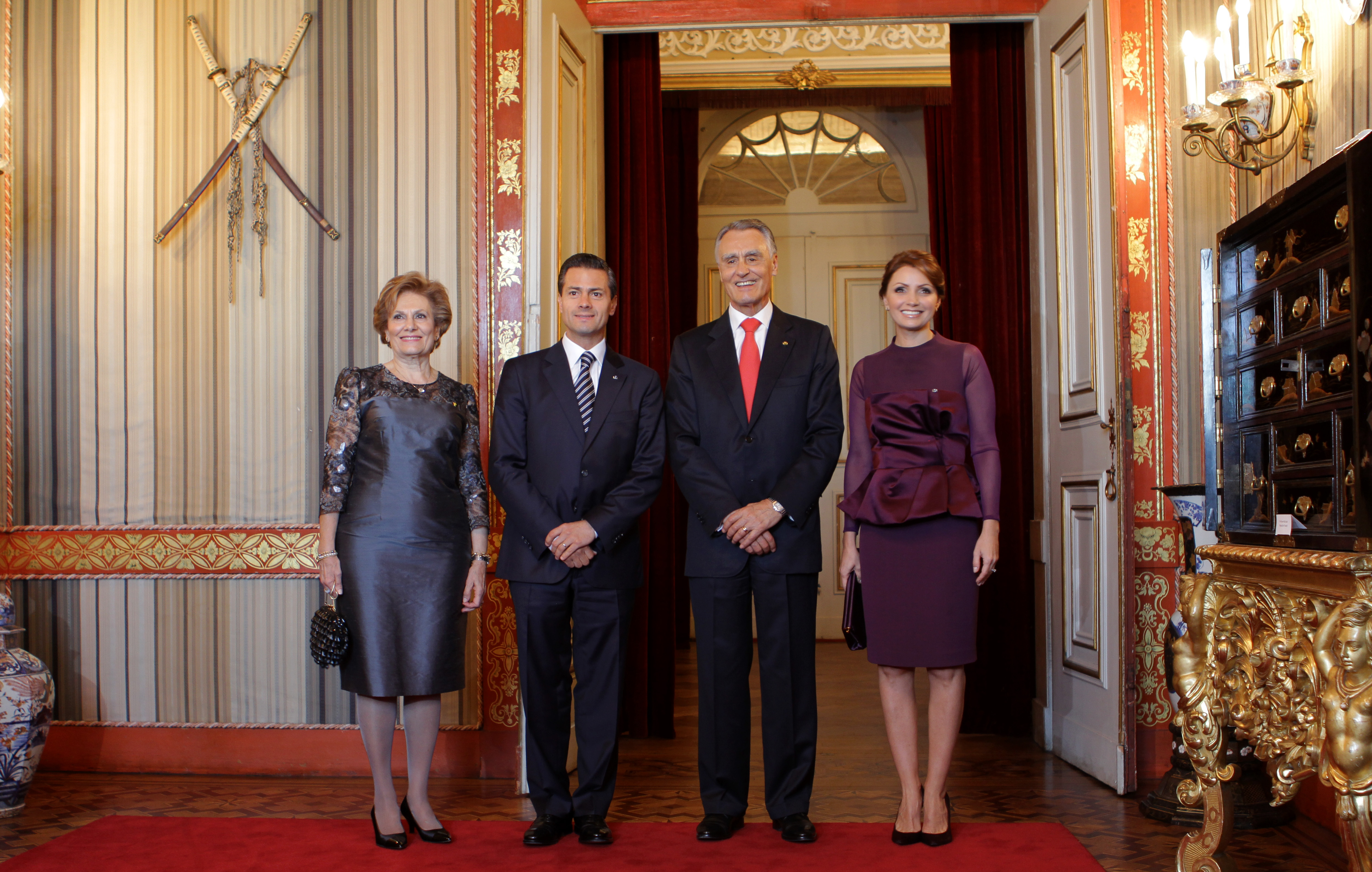
President Enrique Peña Nieto and President Aníbal Cavaco Silva in Lisbon, Portugal; June 2014.

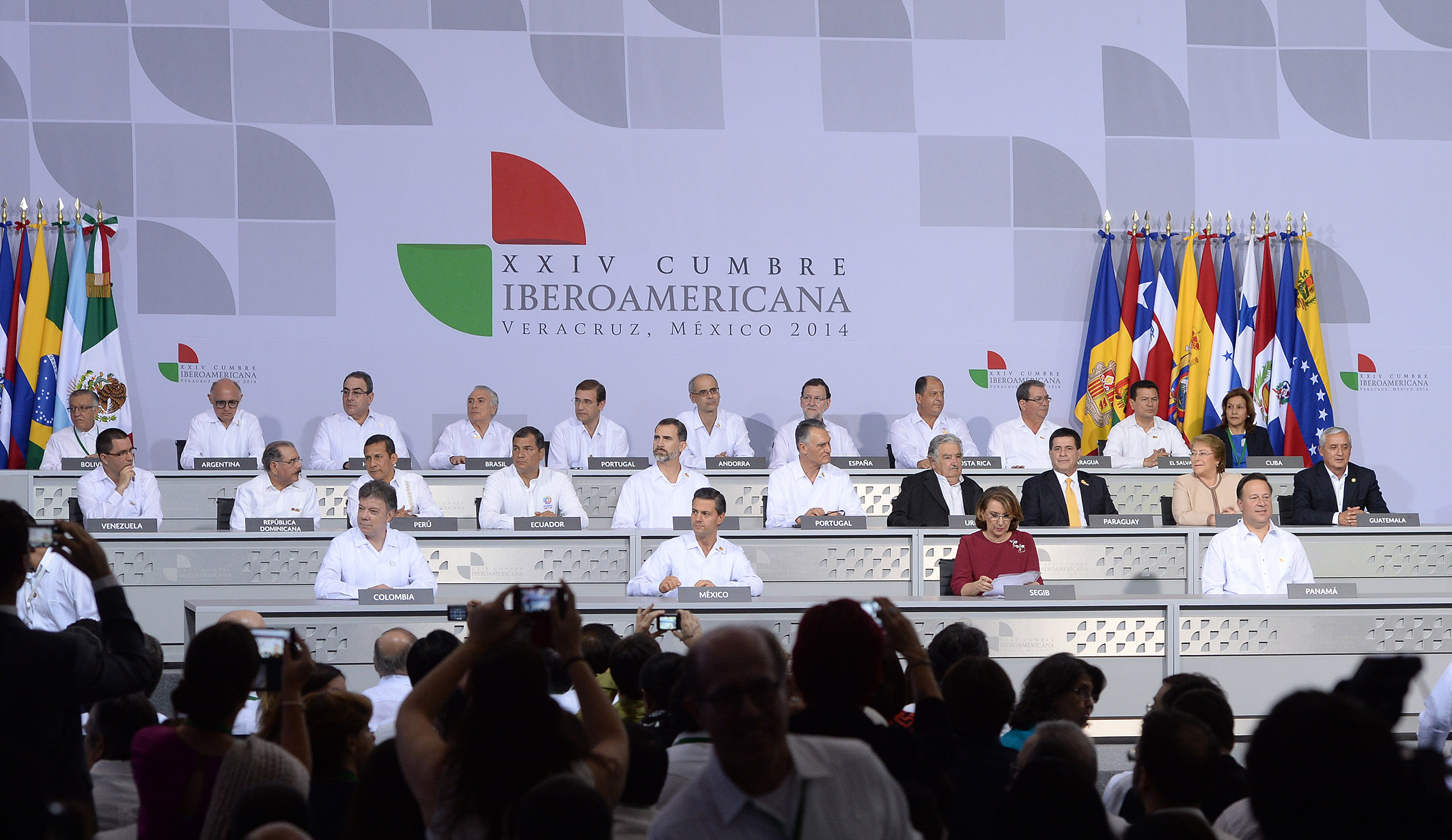
President Enrique Peña Nieto and President Aníbal Cavaco Silva in Veracruz, Mexico; December 2014.

== Bilateral agreements ==
Both nations have signed several bilateral agreements such as an Agreement on Scientific and Cultural Cooperation (1977); Agreement on Economic and Trade Cooperation (1980); Agreement on Tourism (1996); Treaty of Mutual Legal Assistance in Criminal Matters (1998); Extradition Treaty (1998); Agreement on the Avoidance of Double-Taxation and Fiscal Evasion (1999); Agreement on the Promotion and Reciprocal Protection of Investments (1999); Agreement on Air Transportation (2013); and an Agreement of Cooperation in the Area of Demand, Reduction and Fight against Illicit Trafficking in Narcotic Drugs and Psychotropic Substances (2013).

== Transportation ==
There are direct flights between both nations with Iberojet, TAP Air Portugal and World2Fly.

== Trade ==
In 1997, Mexico signed a Free Trade Agreement with the European Union, of which Portugal is a member of. Since the implementation of the free trade agreement in 2000, trade between the two nations has increased dramatically. In 2023, total trade between the two nations amounted to $811 million USD. Mexico's main exports to Portugal include: unwrought lead, titanium, chemical based products, electronics and telephones, cotton, alcohol, motor vehicles and oil. Portugal's main exports to Mexico include: machinery and instruments, electronics, construction parts, medicine, motor vehicle parts, clothing, wine and olive oil. Mexican multinational companies such as Grupo Bimbo, Grupo Carso and Vitro (among others) operate in Portugal. Portuguese multinational companies such as EDP Renováveis and Mota-Engil (among others) operate in Mexico.

== Resident diplomatic missions ==
- Mexico has an embassy in Lisbon.
- Portugal has an embassy in Mexico City.

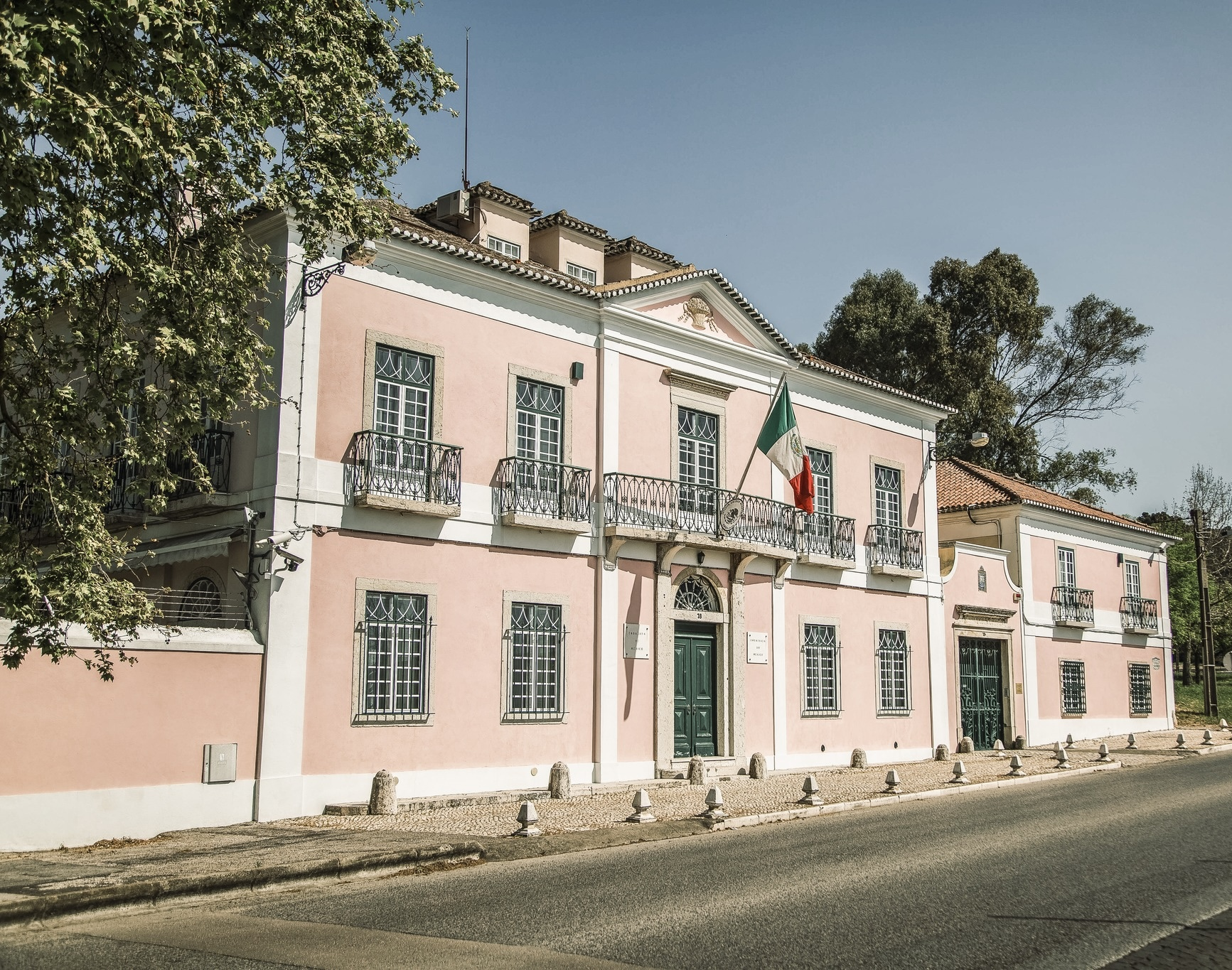
Embassy of Mexico in Lisbon

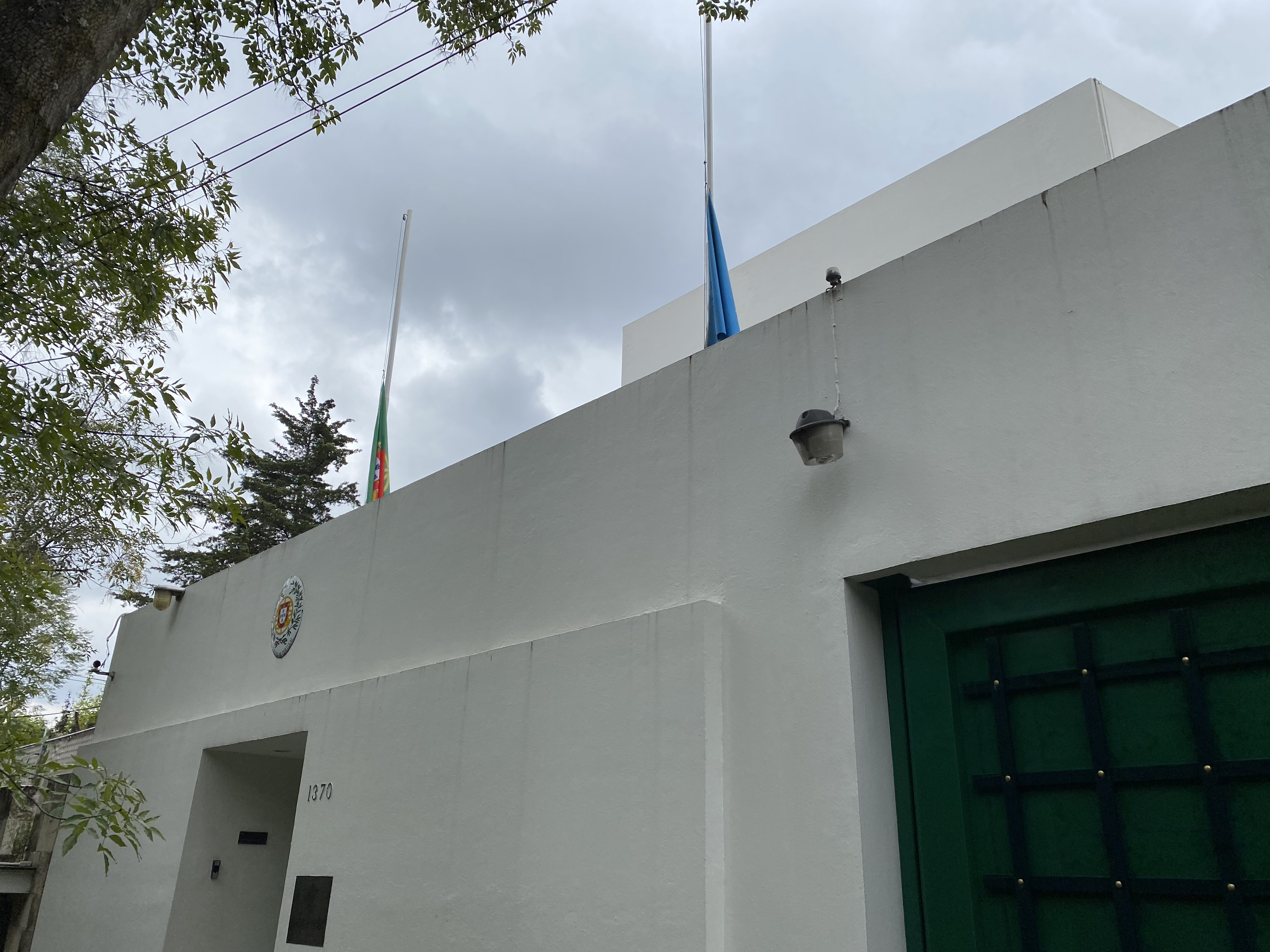
Embassy of Portugal in Mexico City

== Gallery ==
Flags of Mexico and Portugal at the National Palace in Mexico City

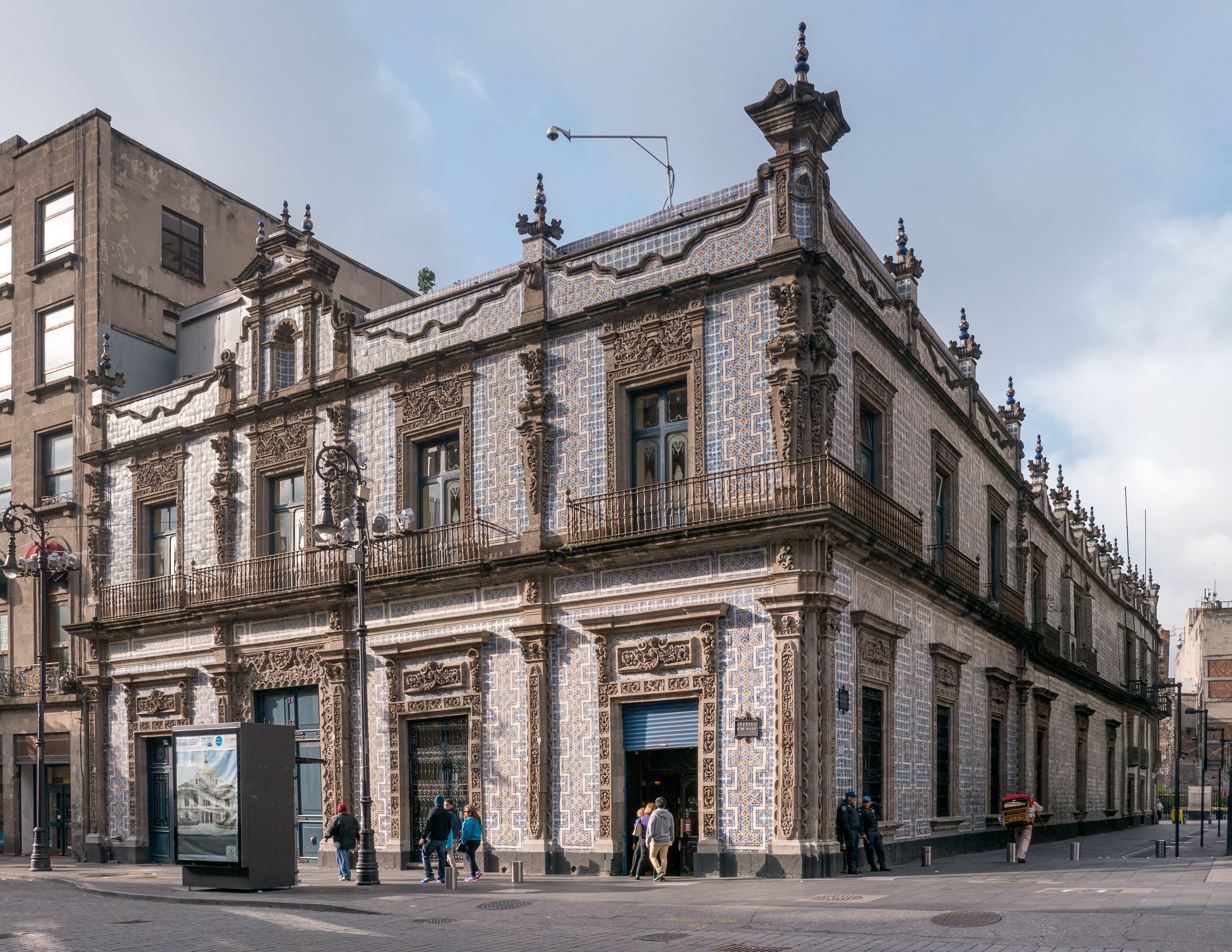
Casa de los Azulejos in Mexico City

Mexican Navy training vessel, the ARM Cuauhtémoc, visiting Lisbon in 2023

Statue of Isabella of Portugal in Puebla, Mexico

== See also ==
- Portuguese Mexicans
