= Henrique Bernardelli =

Brazilian painter (1857–1936)

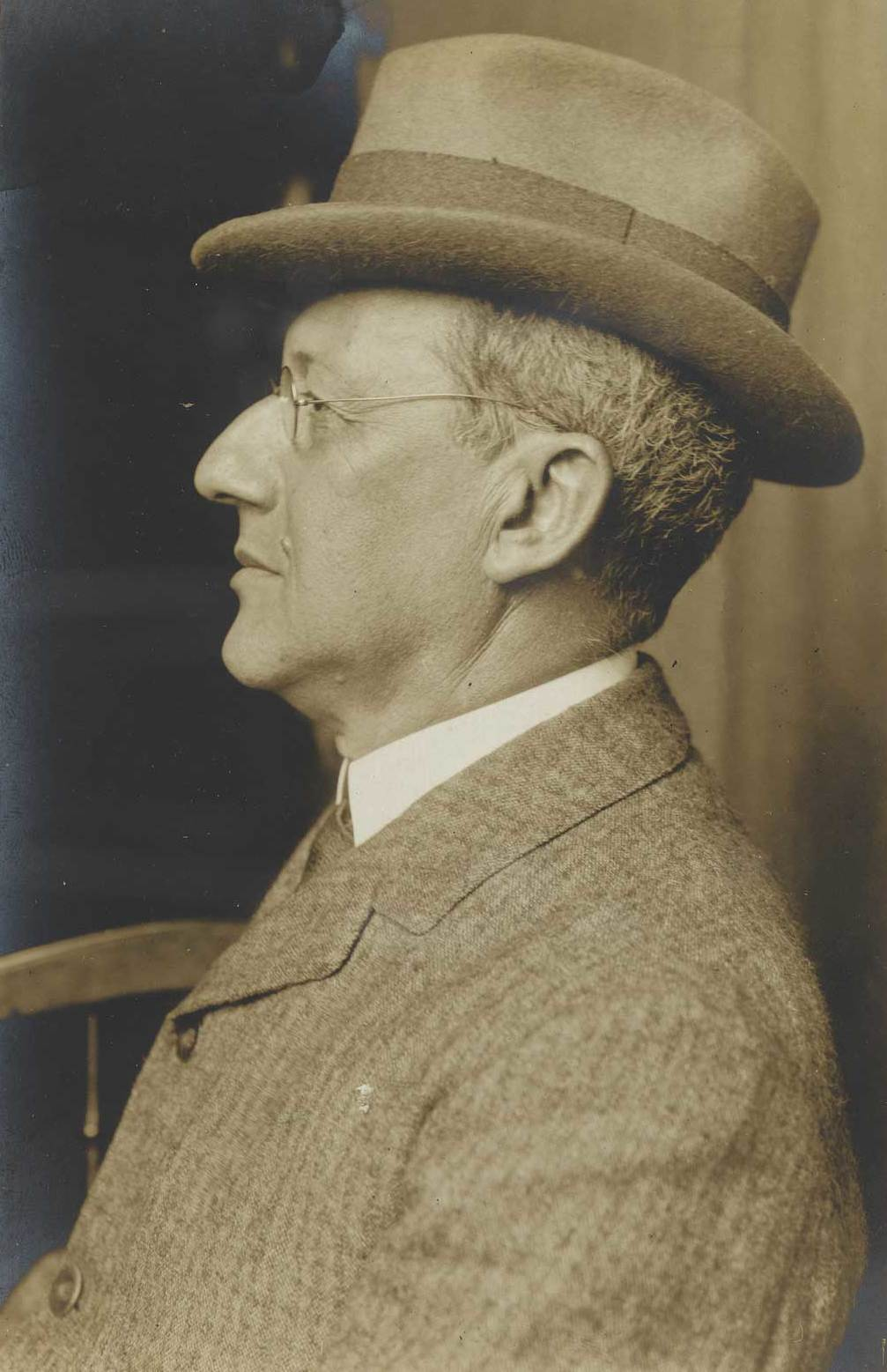
- Bernardelli in 1912
- Born: 15 July 1857; Valparaíso, Chile
- Died: 6 April 1936 (aged 78); Rio de Janeiro, Brazil
- Education: Academia Imperial de Belas Artes

Henrique Bernardelli (15 July 1857 – 6 April 1936) was a Brazilian painter.

== Life and Works ==
Enrique Eugenio Bernardelli Thierry was born in Valparaiso, Chile. He was the brother of sculptor Rodolfo, and painter and violinist Félix.

In 1865 he moved with his family to Rio Grande do Sul when his parents (a violinist and a dancer), were contracted by the emperor Pedro II to be tutors to the imperial princesses. In 1867 they moved to Rio de Janeiro.

In 1870 he enrolled in the Academia Imperial de Belas Artes (AIBA) in Rio de Janeiro, Brazil, studying with painters of outstanding importance such as Victor Meirelles and Agostinho José da Mota. In 1878 he took Brazilian nationality to be eligible for AIBA's European travel award. He lost the award to Rodolfo Amoedo but travelled to Rome in 1879 using his own resources. There he encountered the work of such artists as Francesco Paolo Michetti e Giovanni Segantini.

Back in Rio de Janeiro in 1888 he participated in a number of exhibitions: In 1889 at the Paris Universal Exhibition, where he won a bronze medal with the painting Os Bandeirantes; in 1890 at the General Exhibition of Fine Arts, where he showed the works Dicteriade, Tarantella and Calle de Venezia; and in 1893 at the Chicago Universal Exhibition with Messalina, Mater and Proclamação da República.

In 1891 he became a teacher of painting of the recently inaugurated Escola Nacional de Belas Artes. He kept contact with the Italian figurative culture, constantly travelling to cities such as Rome, Naples and Venice. He taught at the school until replaced by Eliseu Visconti in 1906 when he began to give private lessons in his studio, at the same time receiving private commissions.

His performance as a decorator deserves attention, having worked on the Municipal Theatre in Rio de Janeiro, the National Library and the National Museum of Fine Arts. In 1916 he won one of the highest awards that an artist can aspire to in Brazil: the Medal of Honour. He was also a member of the Superior Council of Fine Arts to which he rendered important services.

A large part of the work of Henrique Bernardelli was donated to the state´s art collection. There is a bust of him with his brother Rodolfo in Praça do Lido, Copacabana, by the sculptor Hildegardo Leão Veloso.

== Gallery ==
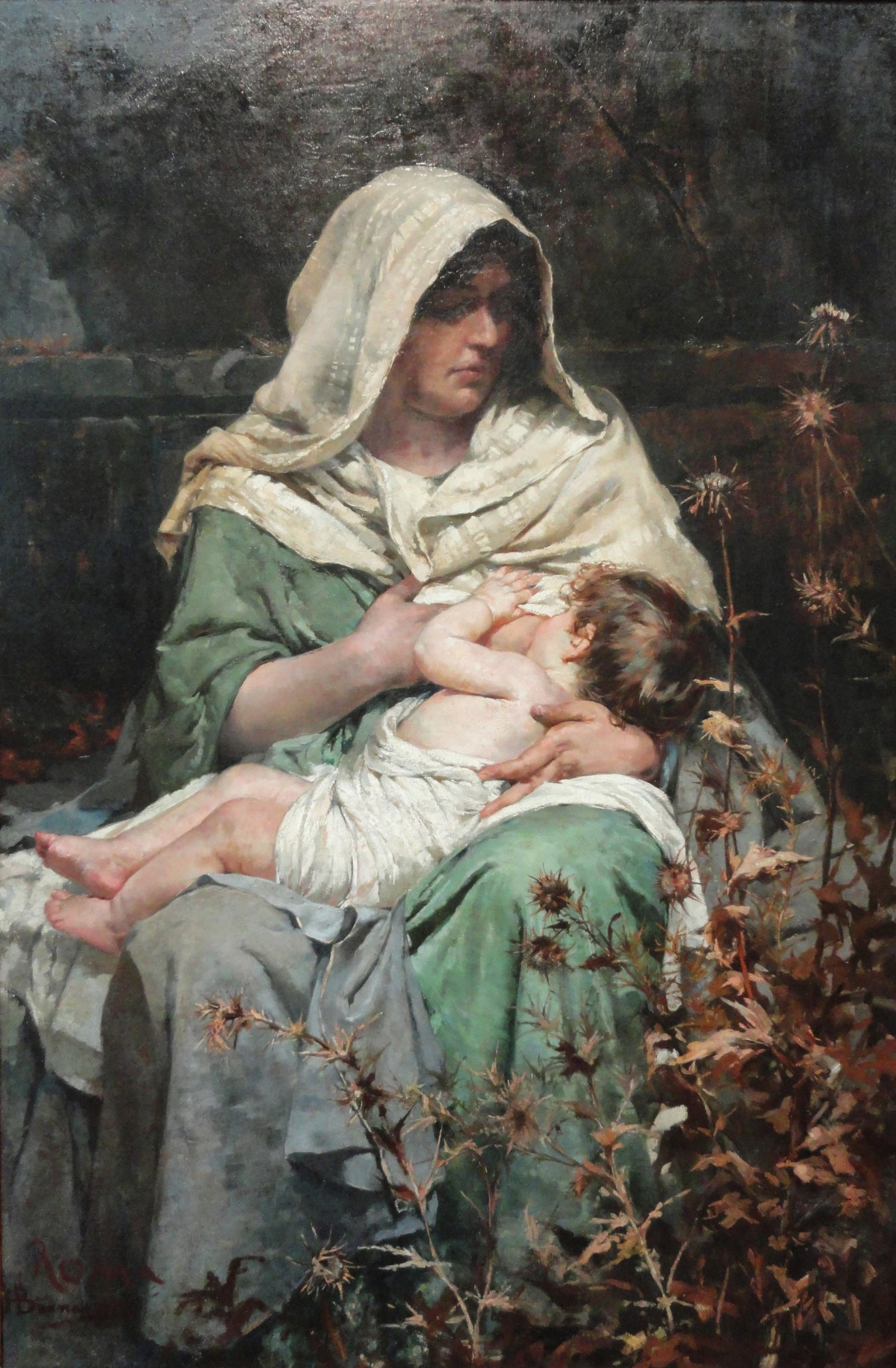
Motherhood

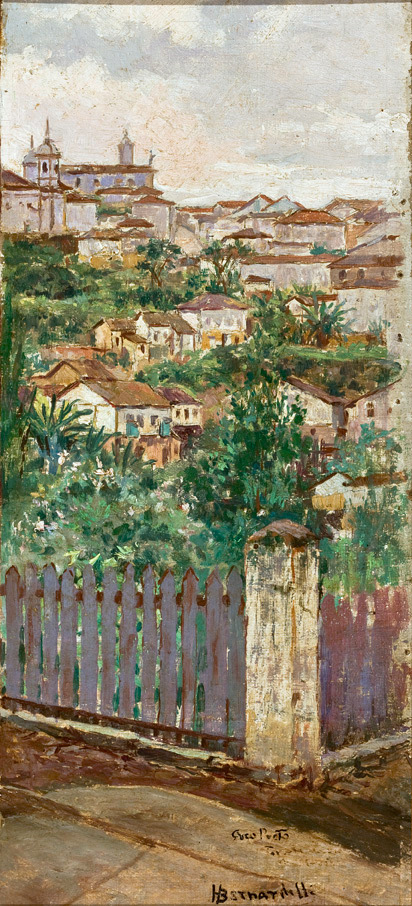
Ouro Preto Countryside

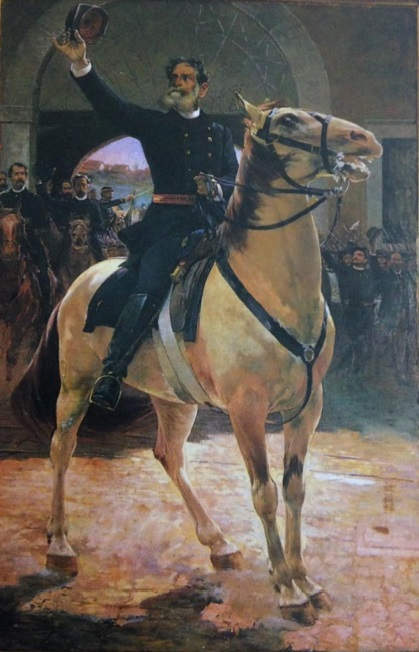
Declaration of the Republic (Deodoro da Fonseca)

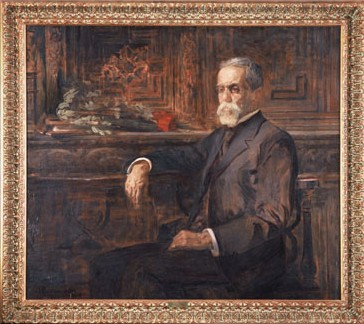
Machado de Assis, 1905

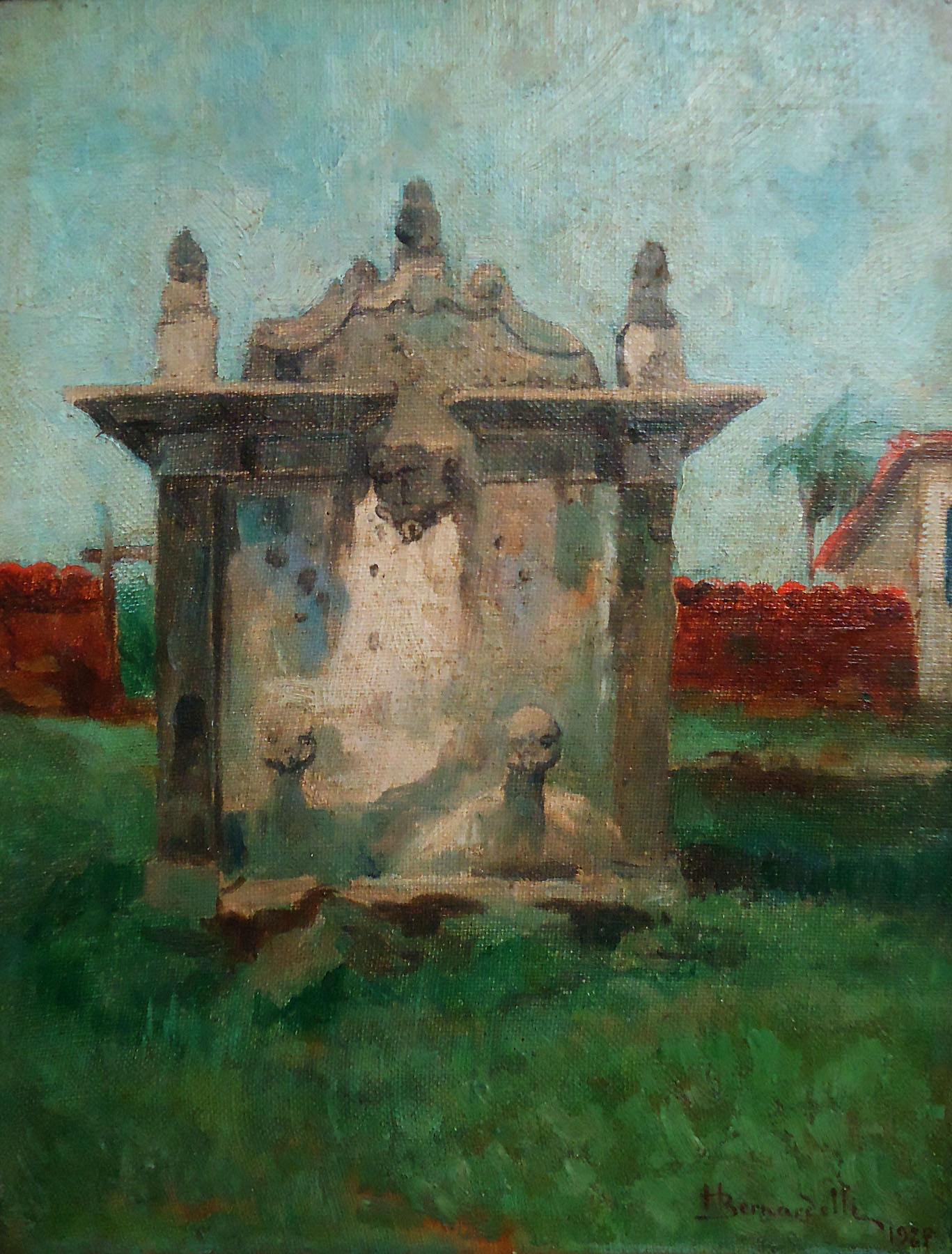
Fountain in Minas Gerais, 1927

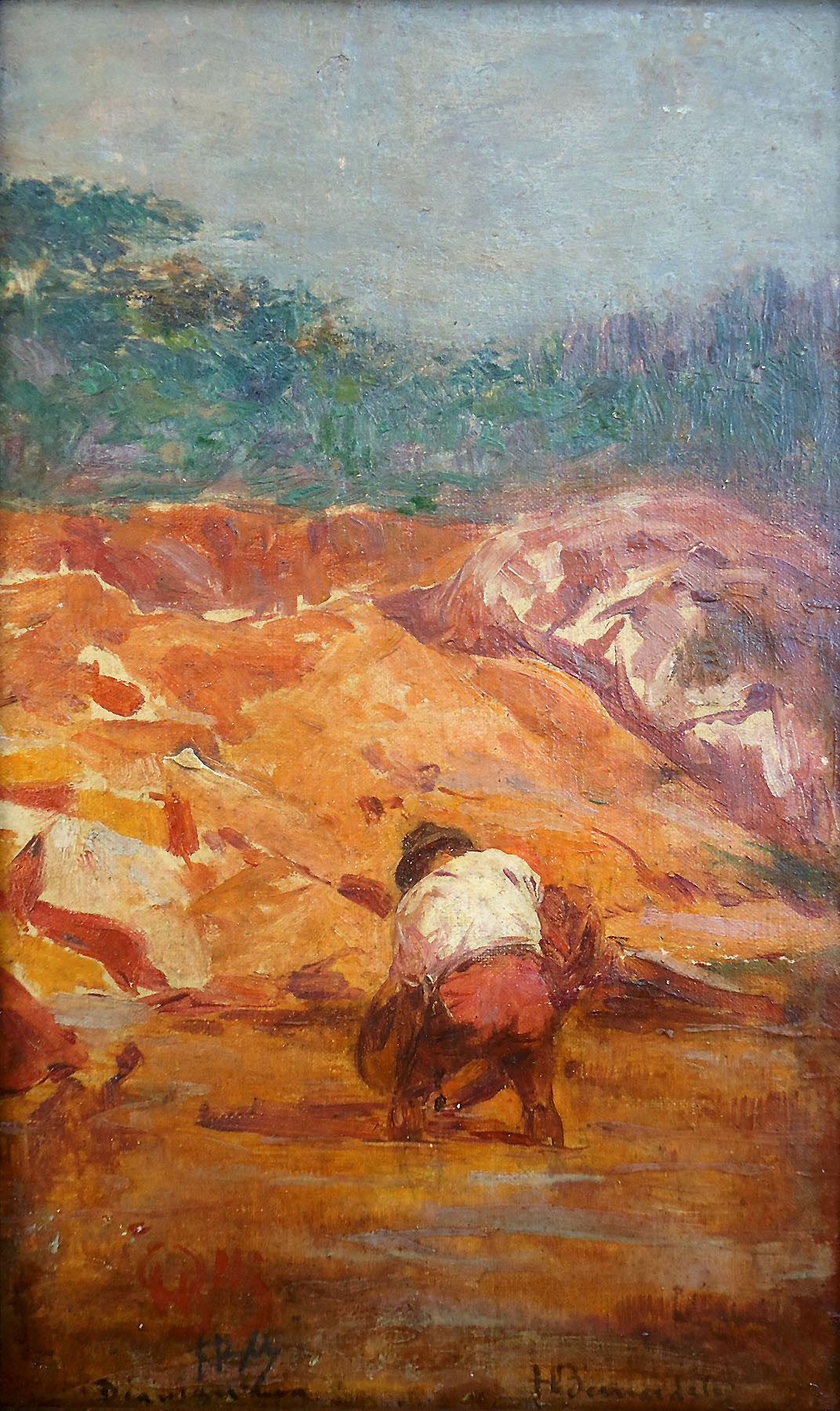
Miner in Diamantina, undated

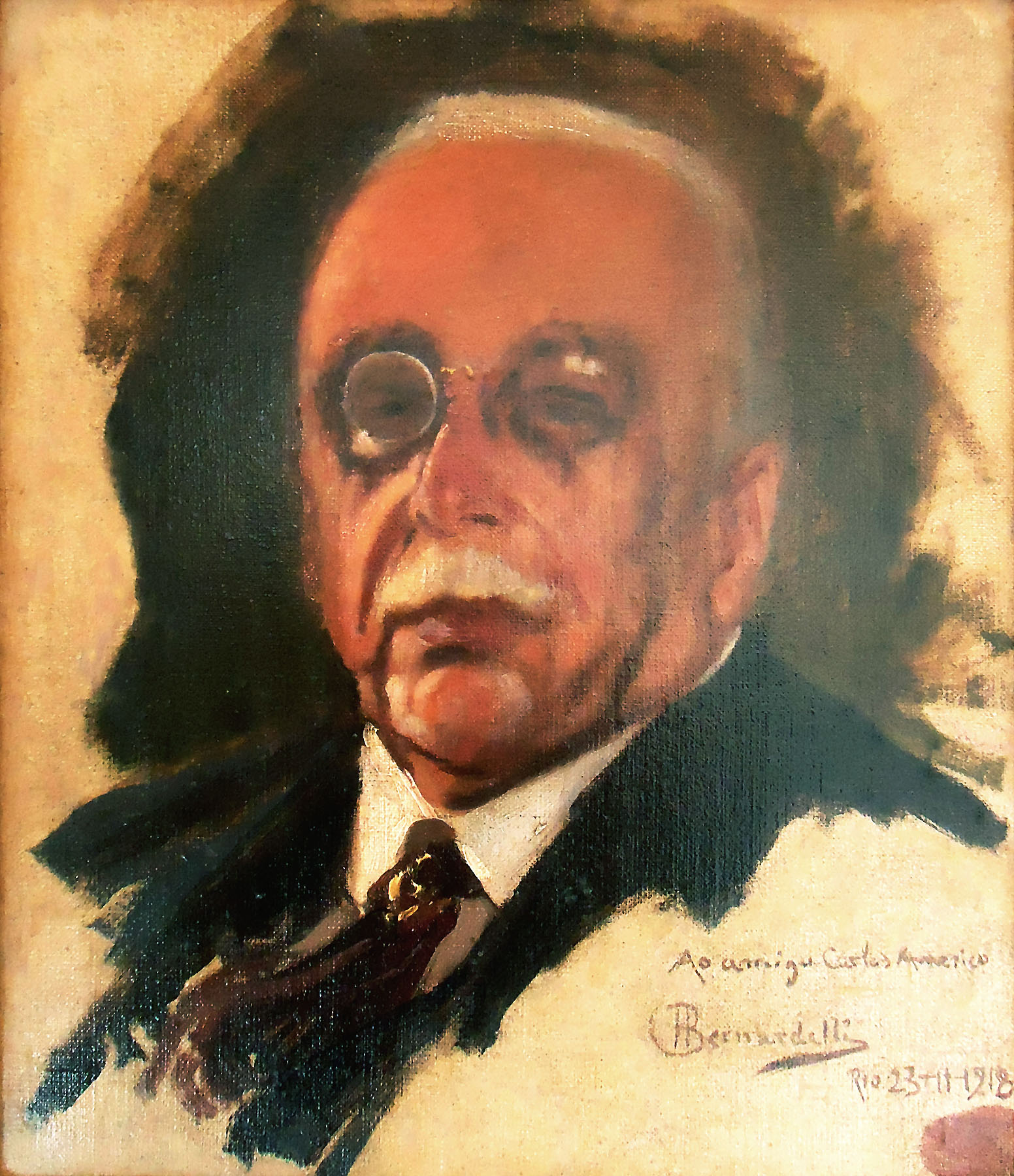
Portrait of Carlos Américo, 1918

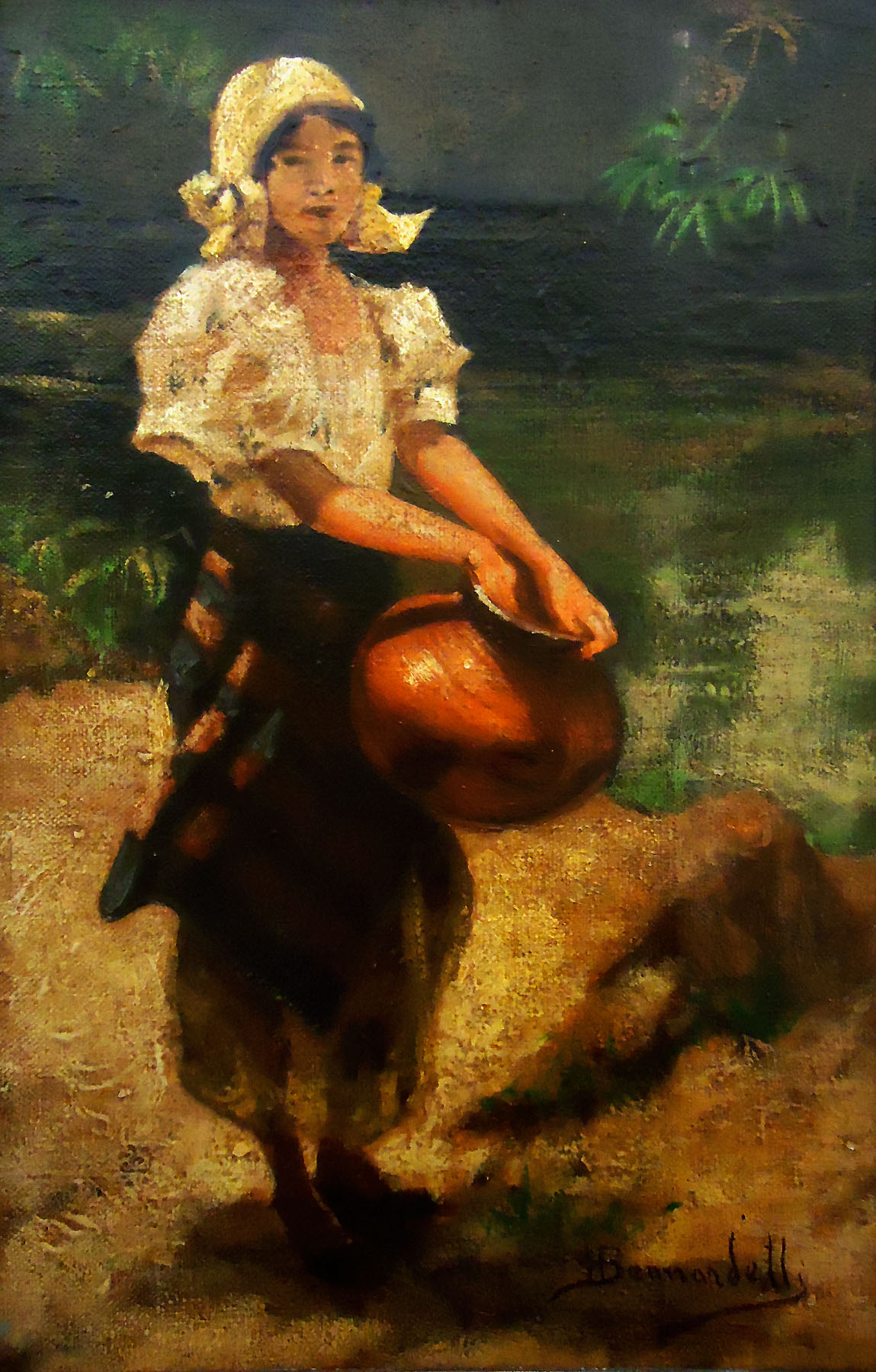
Girl at the fountain

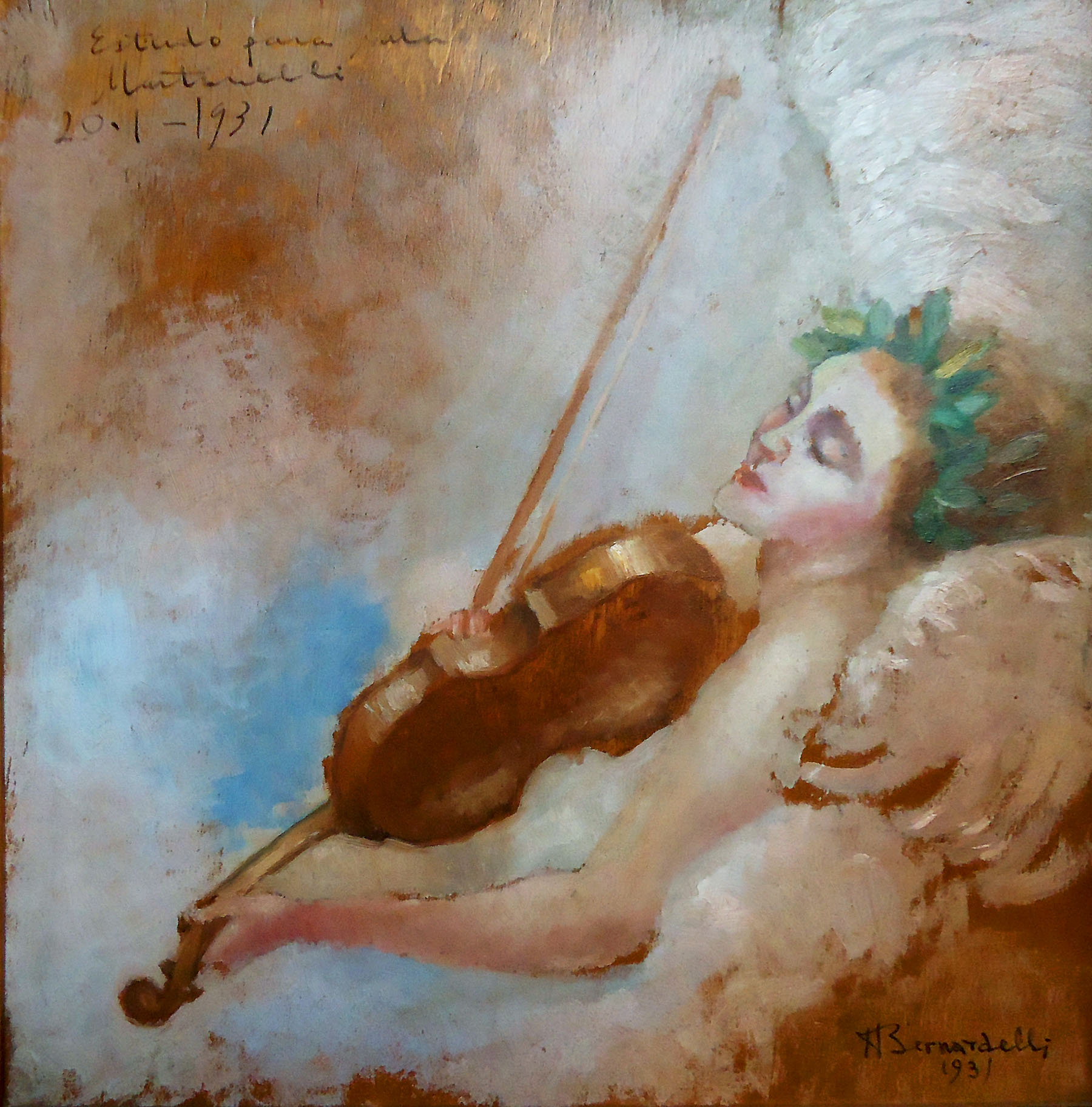
Study for the decoration of Sala Martinelli, 1931

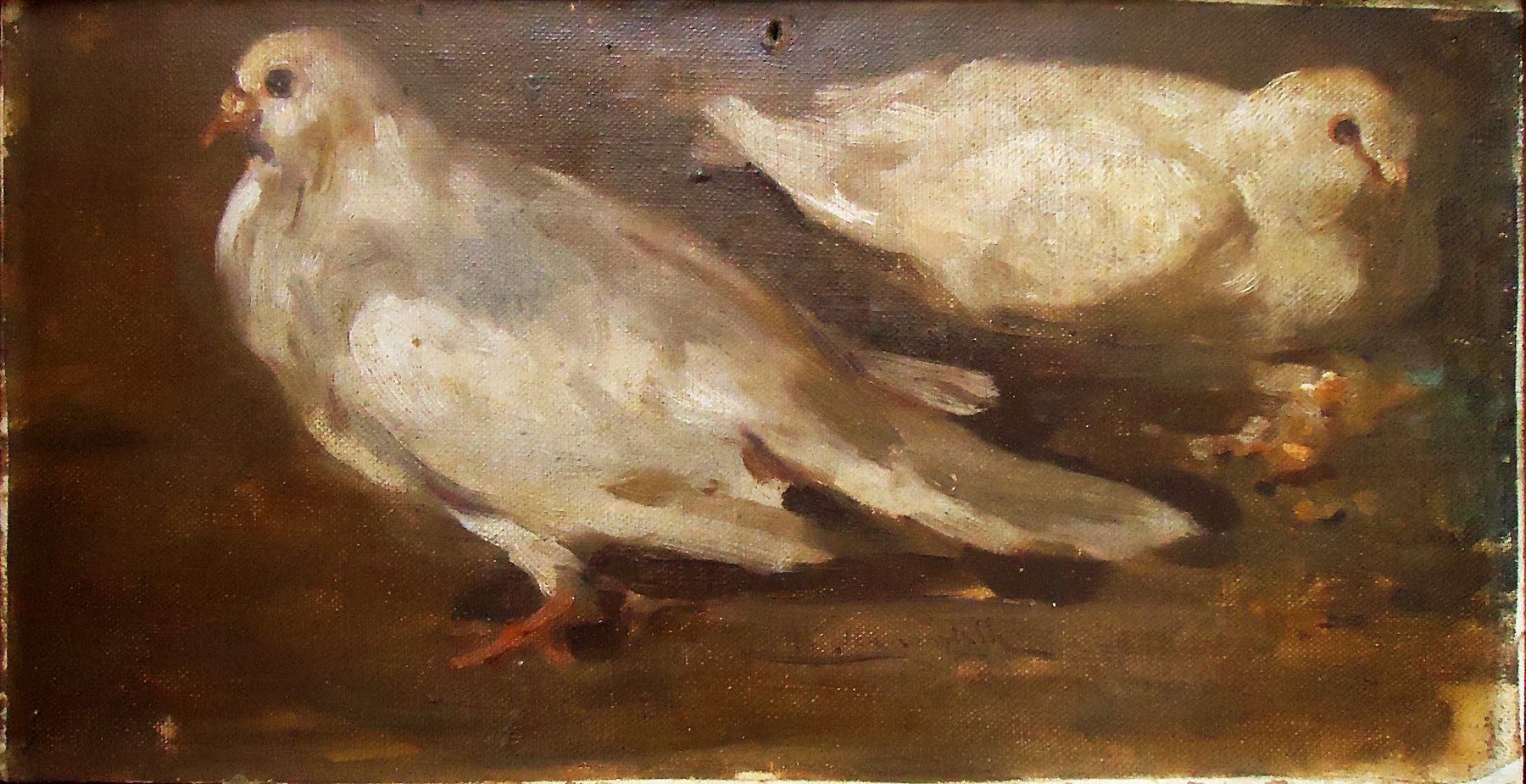
Doves

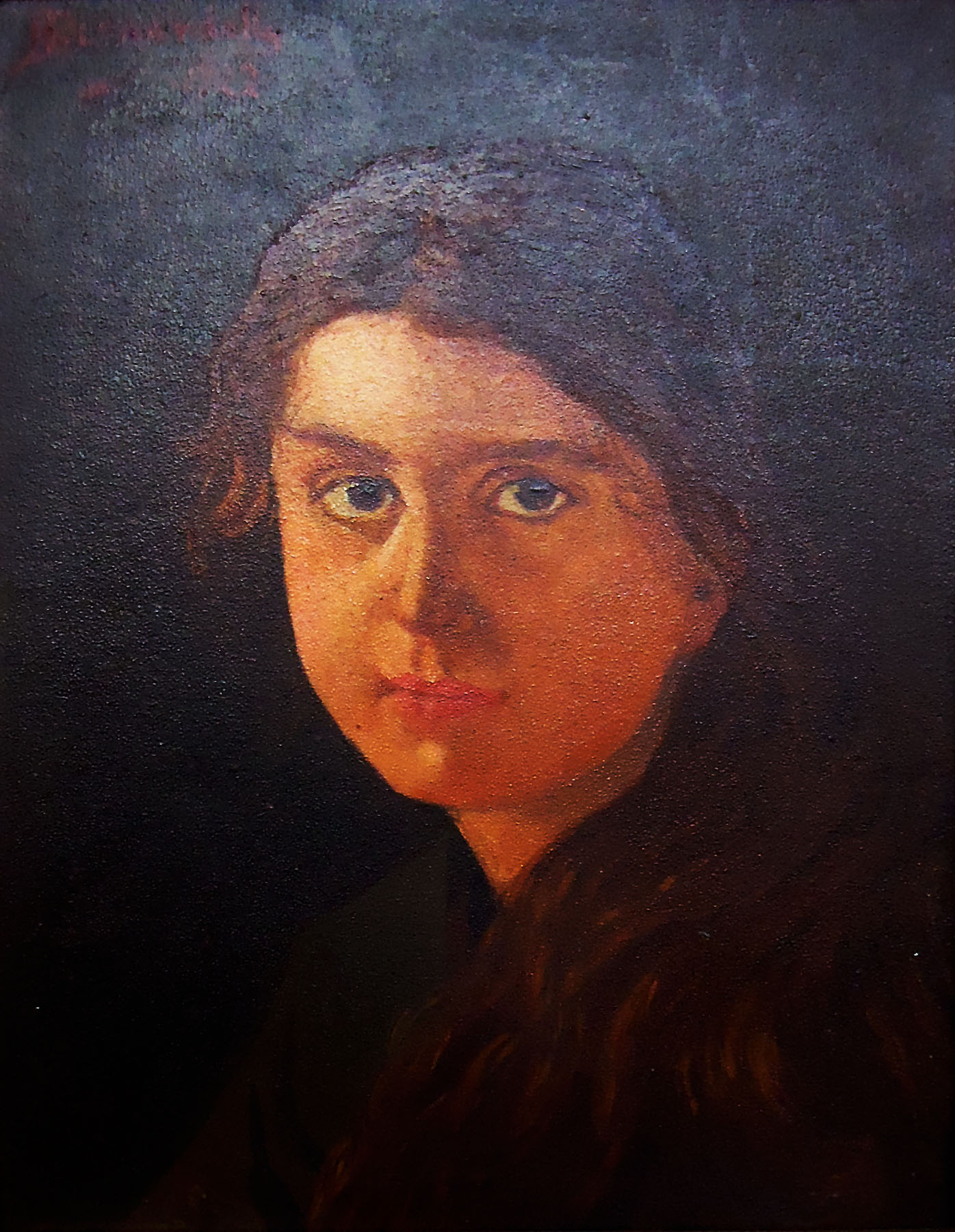
Portrait of a young girl, 1922
