= Rodolfo Bernardelli =

Mexican-born Brazilian sculptor (1852–1931)

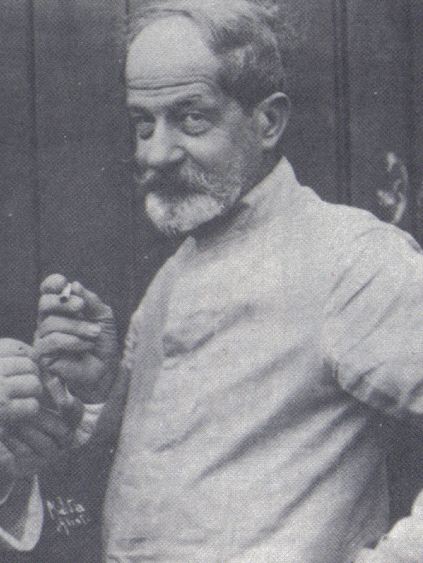
Rodolfo Bernardelli (early 1900s)

José Maria Oscar Rodolfo Bernardelli y Thierry (18 December 1852 – 7 April 1931) was a Mexican-born Brazilian sculptor and art professor, of Italian ancestry. He is the Patron of the 21st chair of the Brazilian Academy of Fine Arts.

== Biography ==
He was the oldest of four children born to a violinist and a dancer. His brothers, Félix and Henrique, also became artists, and Félix was a musician as well. Due to his parents' profession, the family moved frequently; to several places in Mexico, Chile, and eventually Rio Grande do Sul, Brazil. There, they met Emperor Pedro II, who invited them to live in Rio de Janeiro and become tutors to his children. By that time, Rodolfo was fourteen, and displaying artistic talent.

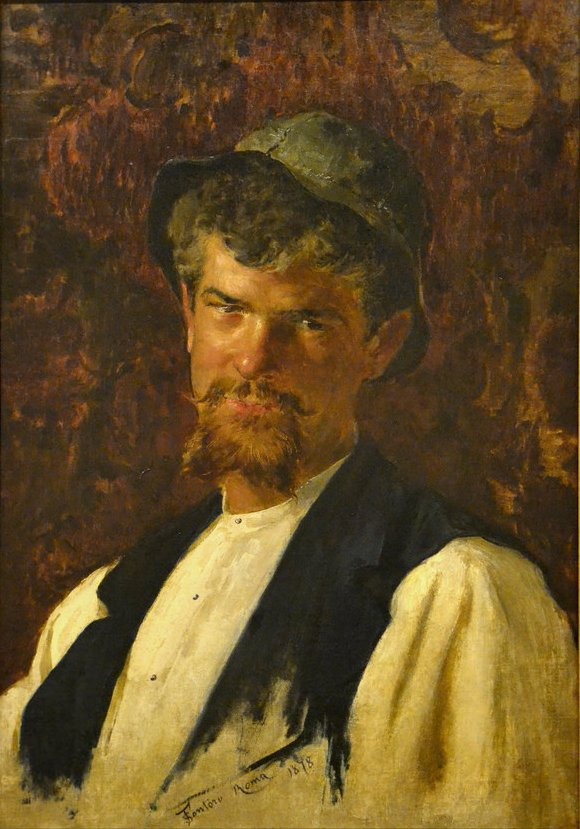
Bernardelli in Rome; by Francesco Santoro (1878)

He sat in on classes taught by Francisco Manuel Chaves Pinheiro, who noticed his enthusiasm and suggested that he become a formal student. He was therefore enrolled at the Academia Imperial de Belas Artes, winning several academic awards. In 1876, he received a stipend for study abroad. He initially intended to study in Paris, as was customary, but found himself unimpressed by the artistic milieu there, and the academies were crowded. As a result, he decided to go to his ancestral homeland and settled in Rome, where he studied with Giulio Monteverde. Although he expressed a preference for Classicism, he soon found himself influenced by contemporary trends, and the examples he sent back to the Academia came under criticism.

After completing his studies, he returned to Brazil in 1885. In October of that year, he held an exhibition of the works he had created in Italy and, as a result, was appointed Professor of Statuary at the Academia, succeeding his former teacher, Chaves Pinheiro, who had retired. With support from the Imperial family, he received several important commissions, including monuments for Generals Manuel Luís Osório and Duque de Caxias. When the monarchy fell, in 1889, he resigned his position in solidarity. However, by invitation of the new Republican government, he was reinstated in 1890. In that position, he collaborated on a project that converted the Academia Imperial into the Escola Nacional de Belas Artes, and liberalized its teaching methods. He then became its first director; serving until 1915.

In 1893, he was responsible for selecting the works that would represent Brazil at the World's Columbian Exposition in Chicago. In 1904, he was part of a judging committee for choosing new façades on the Avenida Central, and served on a commission to select an architect for the proposed Teatro Municipal. He would contribute six ornamental statues for the Teatro.

He was the most influential sculptor of his generation. His workshop in central Rio de Janeiro was a meeting place for numerous cultural and political figures, including Quintino Bocaiuva, Olavo Bilac, Machado de Assis, Raul Pompéia, Leopoldo Miguez, Angelo Agostini and Pereira Passos. Nevertheless, his public image was less flattering, with a significant number of critics who considered him to be vain, arrogant and mediocre. Much of that criticism derived from his dismissal of several prominent artists when he became Director of the Escola Nacional. They included Victor Meirelles, Antônio Parreiras and Décio Villares.

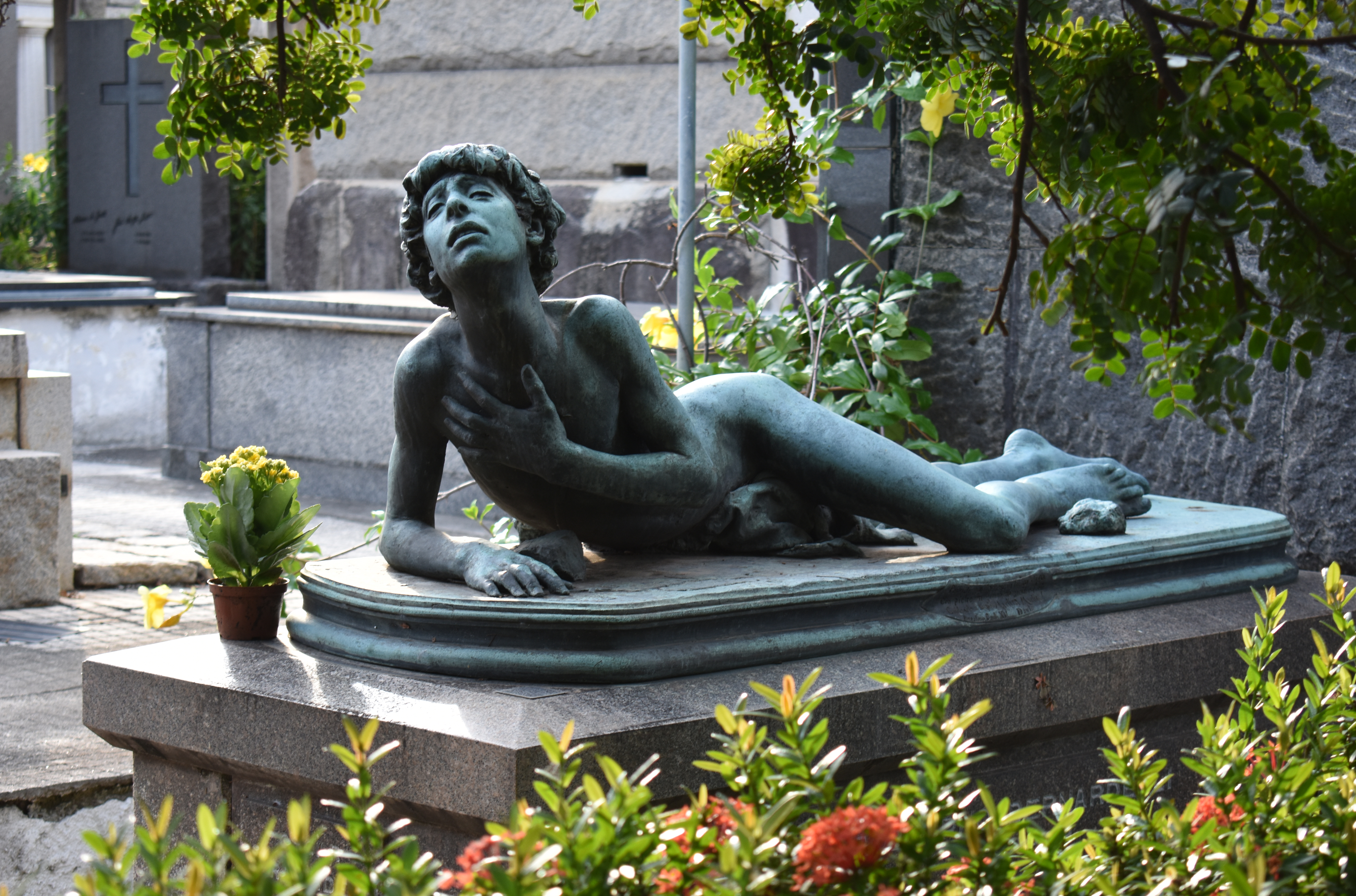
Bernardelli family grave in Cemitério São João Baptista, Rio de Janeiro

In any event, he served as Director for twenty-five years and held a virtual monopoly on artistic education in the capital. During his tenure, there were very few sculpture students at the school, as they were apparently discouraged at the thought of being eclipsed by him. In 1915, a group of students and teachers managed to have him removed. His final years would pass mostly in solitude, working at his new studio in Copacabana. In 1919, he was named an "Honorary Academician" at the Real Academia de Bellas Artes de San Fernando, in Madrid.

Rodolfo Bernardelli is buried in Cemitério de São João Batista in Rio de Janeiro, along with family members including Oscar Bernardelli (artista, 1826-1886) and Henrique Bernardelli (pintor, 1857-1936).

Following his death in 1931, the Núcleo Bernardelli, a progressive artists' society, was created to honor him and his brother, Henrique. A considerable number of his smaller, less monumental works were donated to the Pinacoteca do Estado and the Museu Mariano Procópio.

== Selected works ==
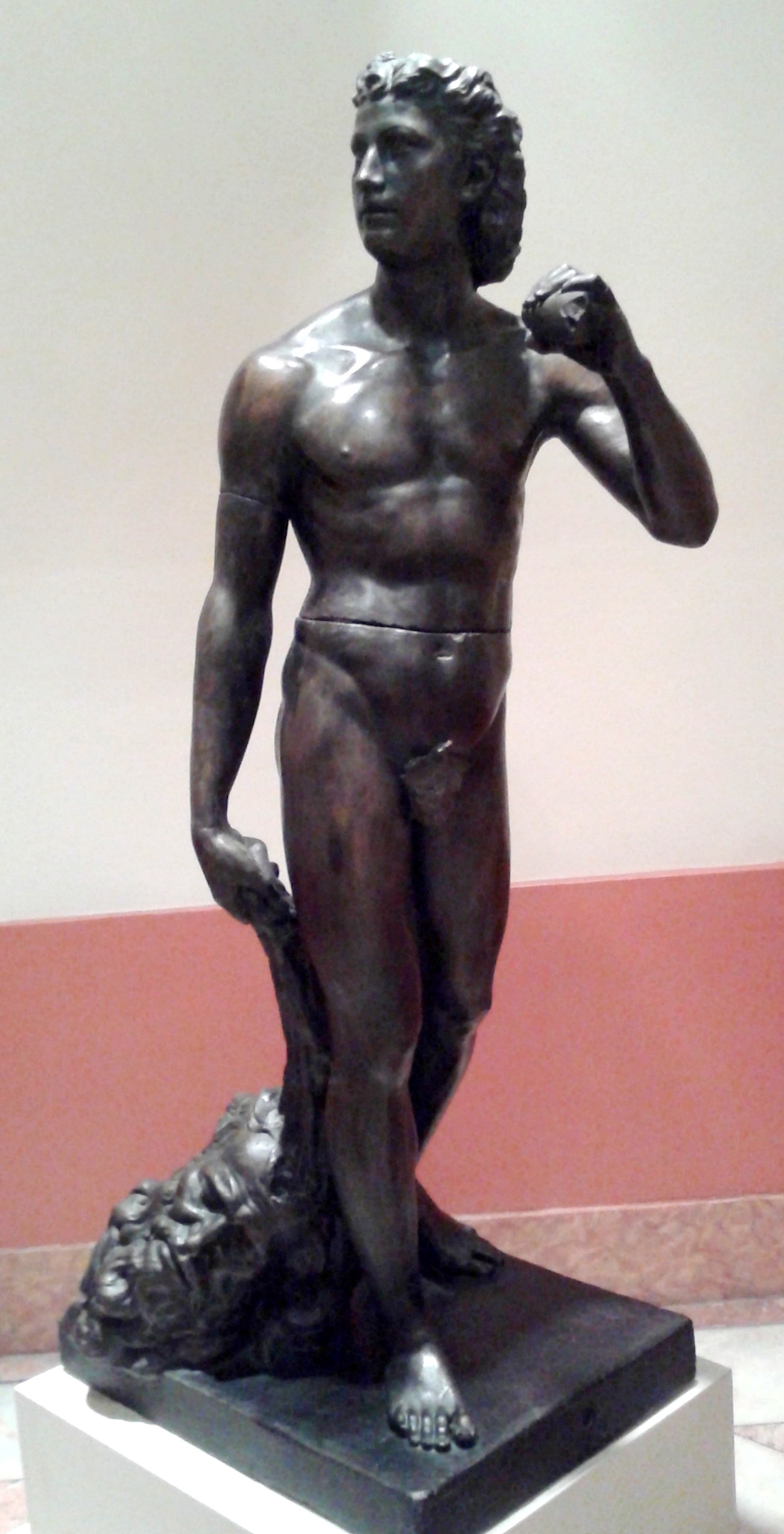
David, 1875

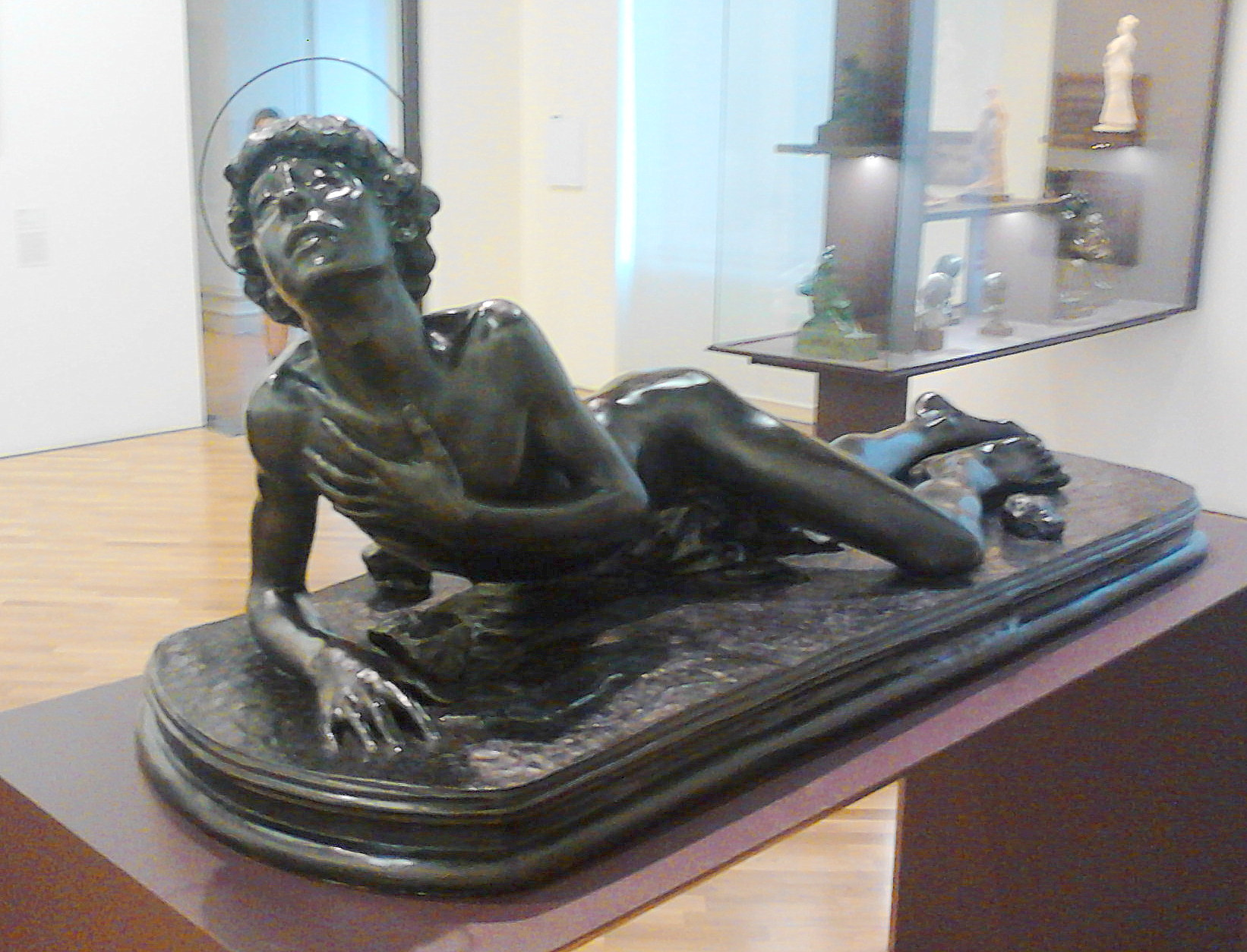
Saint Stephen, 1879

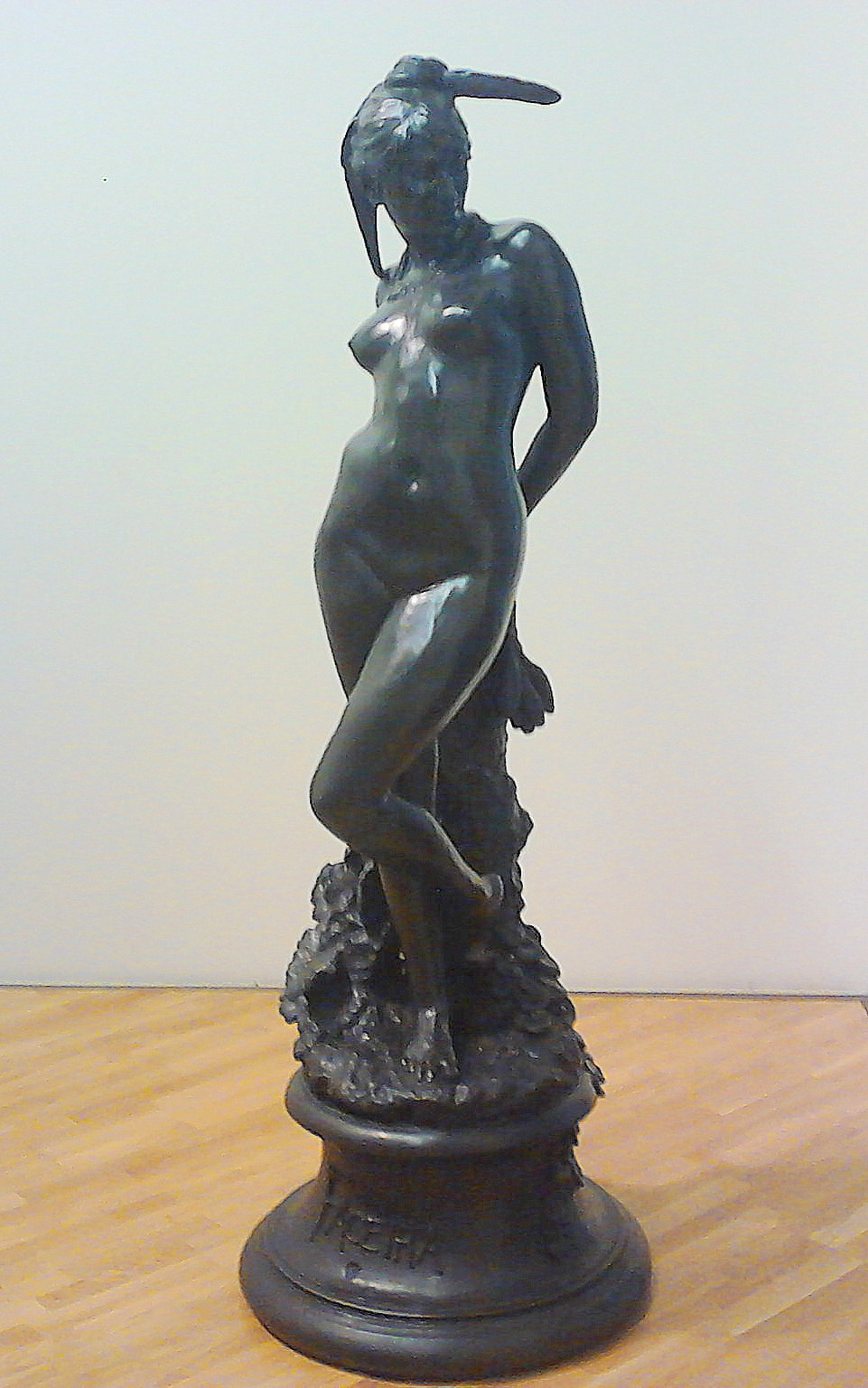
Coquette, 1880

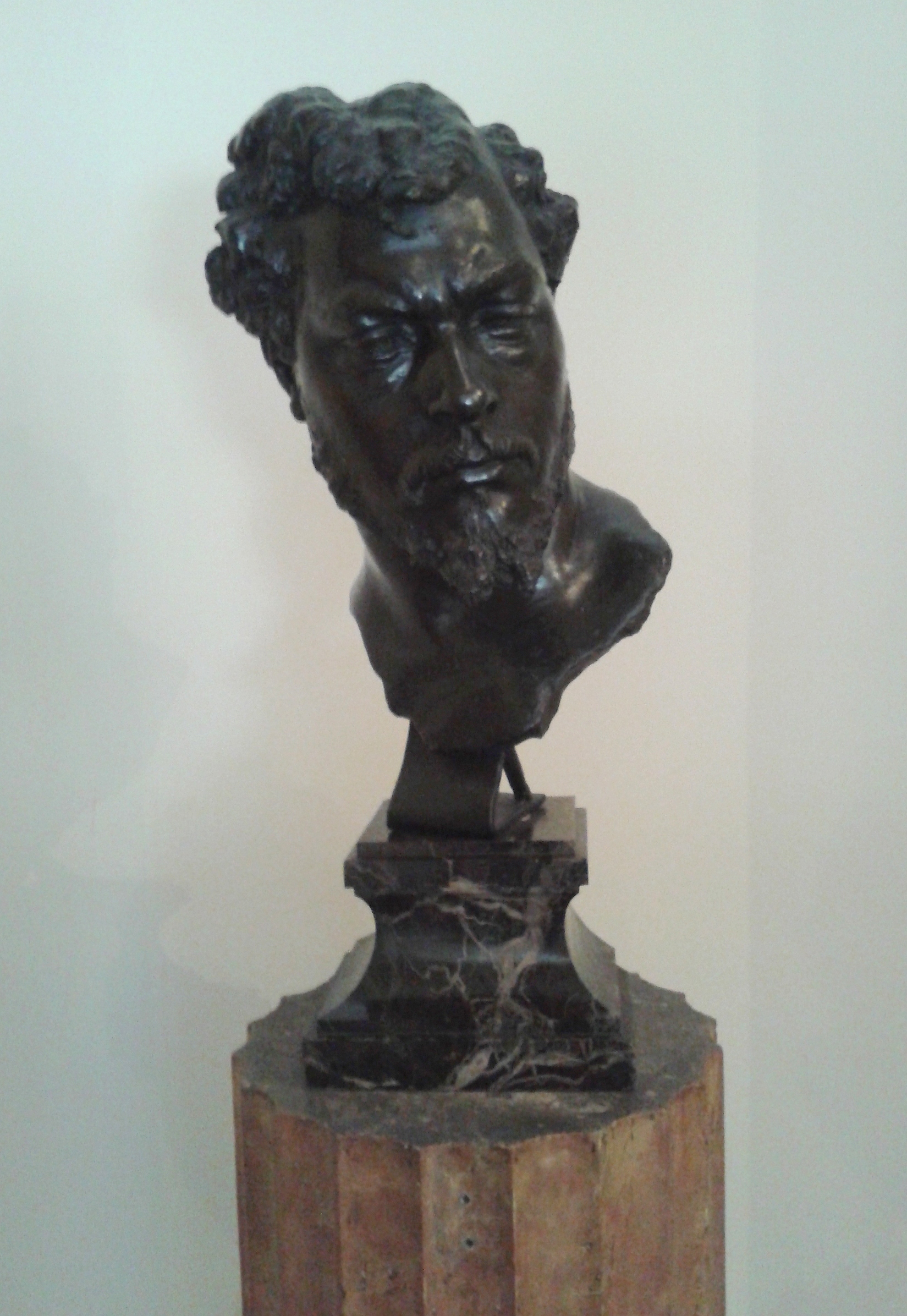
Doctor Montenovese, 1882

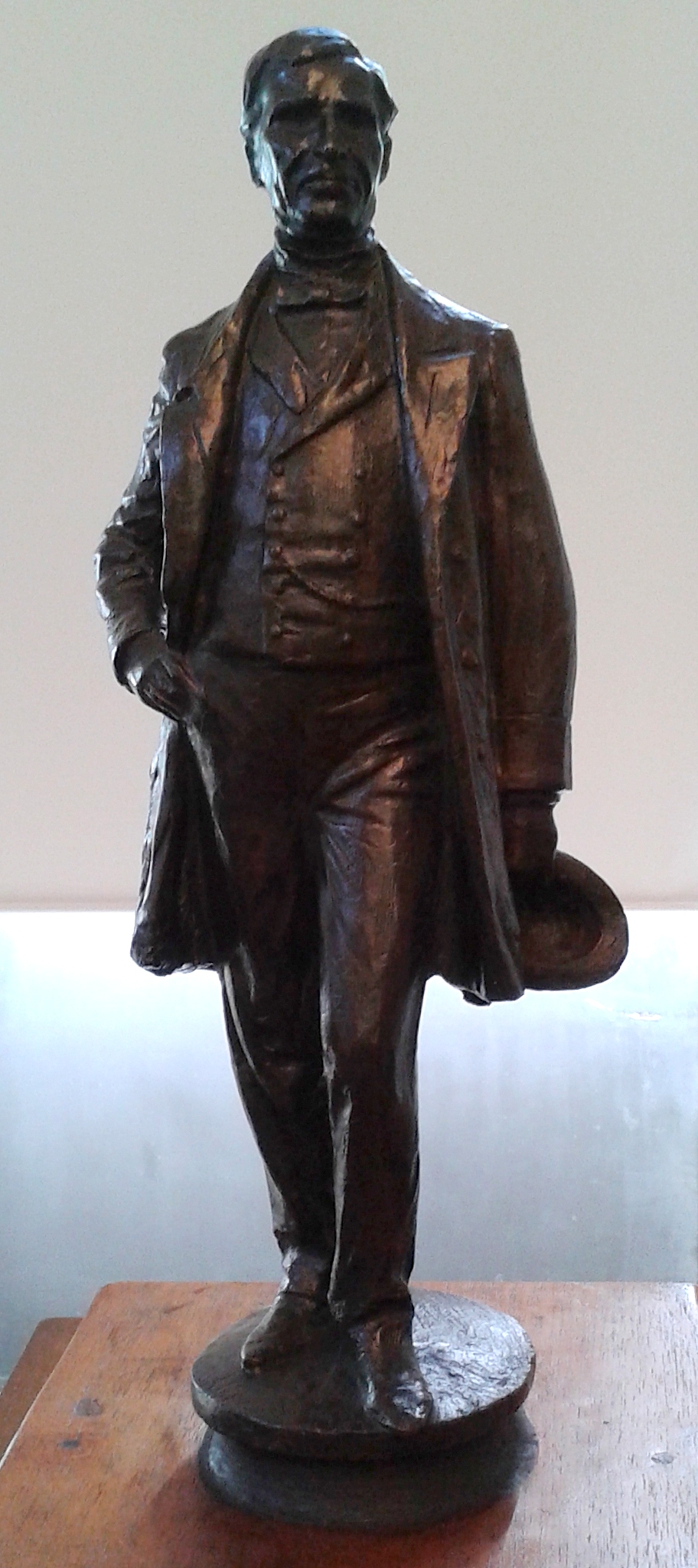
Irineu de Souza, 1899

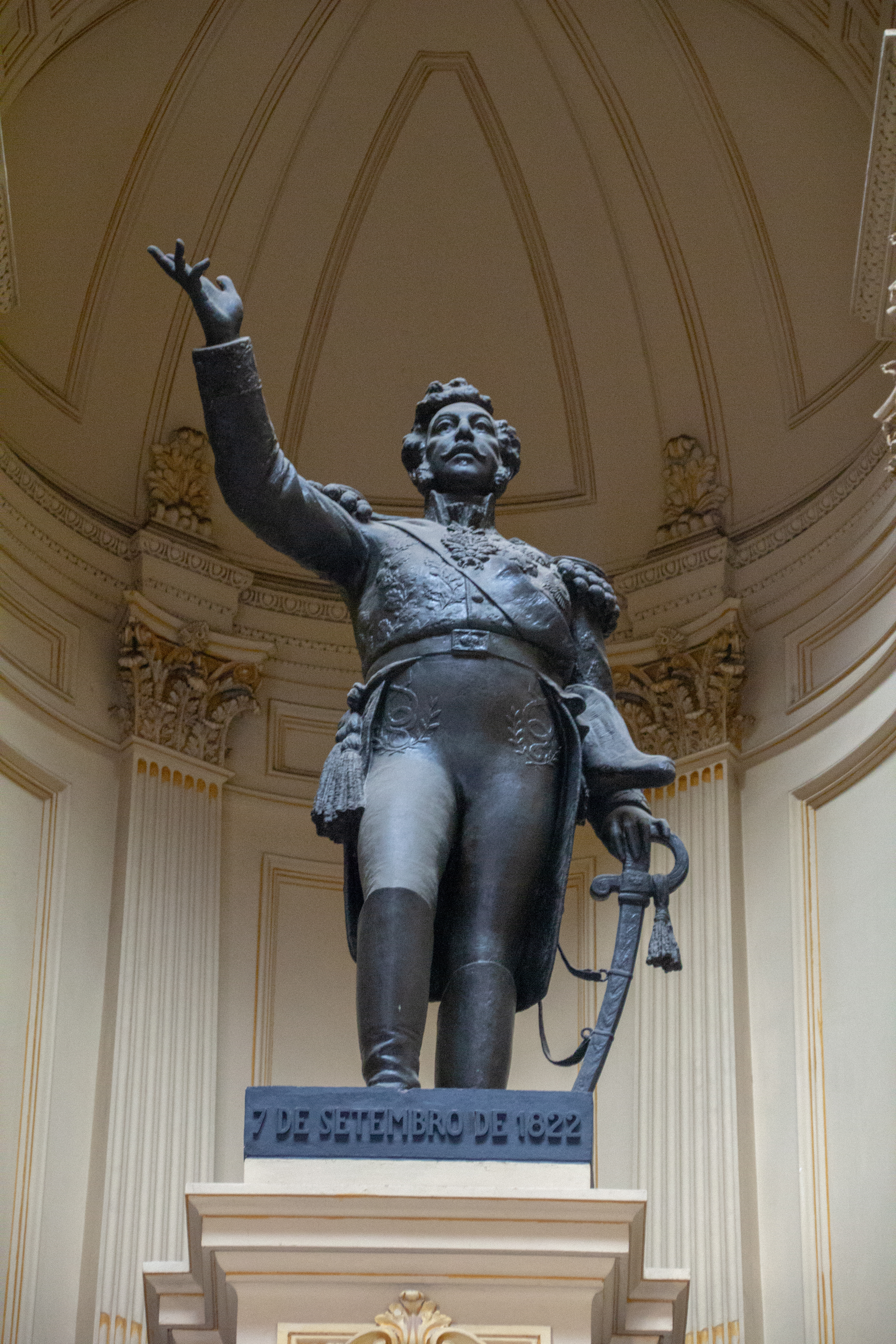
Dom Pedro I, 1923

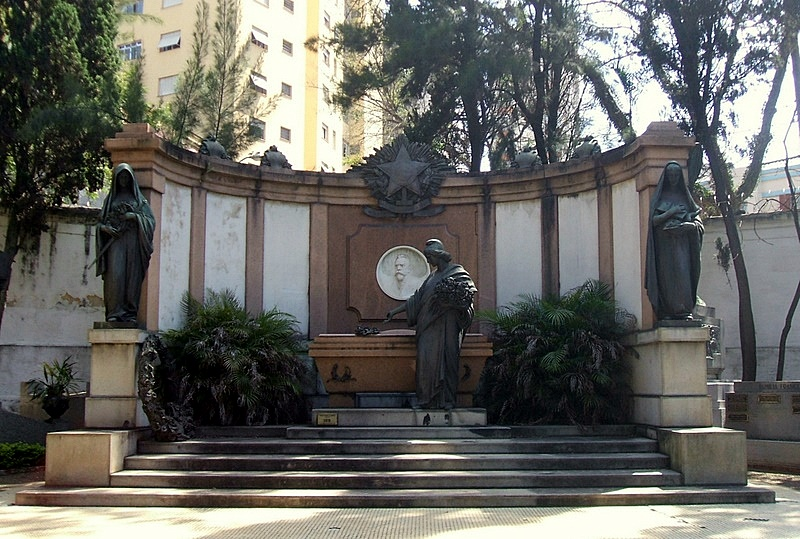
The Tomb of Campos Salles, Cemitério da Consolação

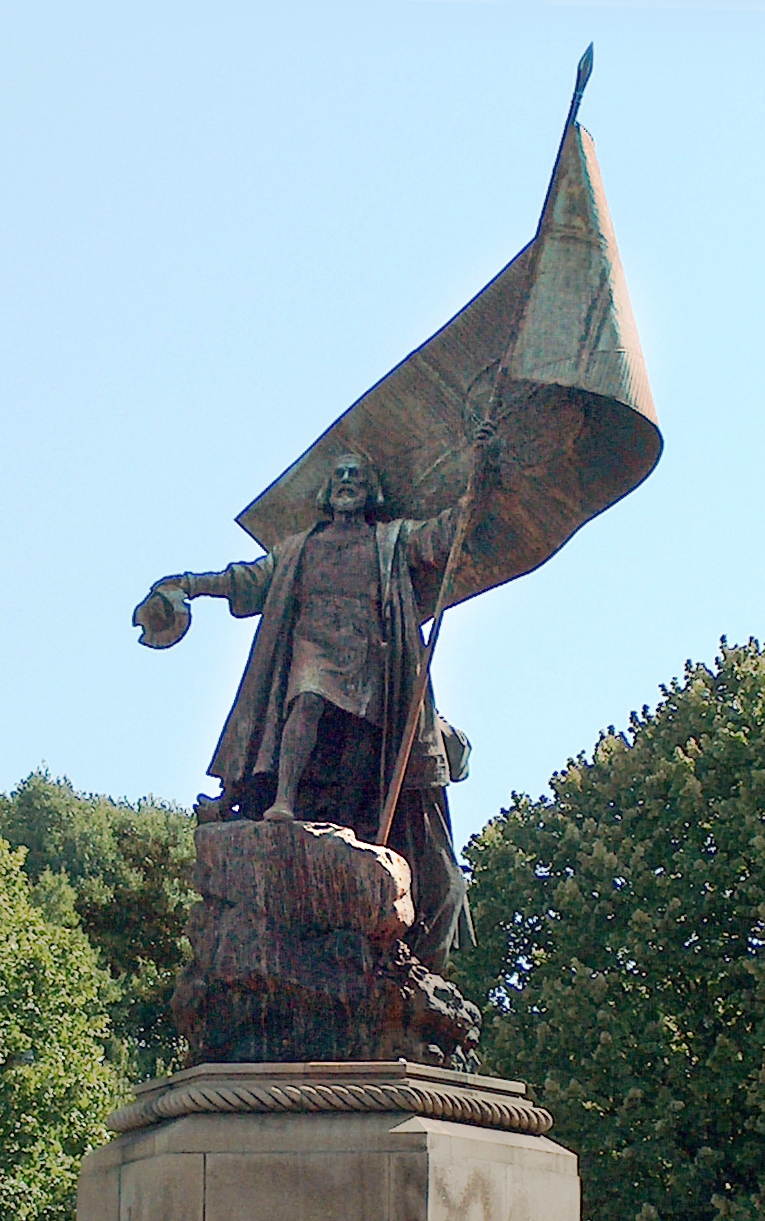
Pedro Álvares Cabral, Lisbon
