= Léia Scheinvar =

Brazilian-Mexican botanist

- Born: Léia Akcelrad Lerner de Scheinvar; September 30, 1954 (age 72); Brazil
- Other name: Leia Scheinvar
- Education: UNAM Faculty of Sciences (1982)
- Known for: Study and protection of Mexican cacti; taxonomic work on Opuntia and related genera
- Scientific career
- Fields: Botany
- Workplaces: National Autonomous University of Mexico (UNAM) – Laboratorio de Cactáceas, Botanical Garden
- Thesis: (1982)
- Author abbrev. (botany): Scheinvar

Léia Akcelrad Lerner de Scheinvar is a Brazilian-Mexican botanist. She has dedicated her work to studying and protecting Mexico's cacti.

== Early life and education ==
Scheinvar was born in Brazil on 30 September 1954.

She received her doctorate in biology from the UNAM Faculty of Sciences in 1982.

== Career ==
She is responsible for the Laboratorio de Cactáceas in the botanical garden of UNAM.
