= List of international presidential trips made by Luiz Inácio Lula da Silva =

This is a list of international presidential trips made by Lula da Silva, the 39th and current president of Brazil. Lula has made 49 international trips to 44 countries during his second presidency so far, which began on 1 January 2023.

== First presidency (2003–2011) ==
Number of visits per country during Lula's first presidency:

- One: Algeria, Antarctica, Austria, Botswana, Burkina Faso, Cameroon, Congo, Costa Rica, Czech Republic, Dominican Republic, East Timor, Egypt, Equatorial Guinea, Finland, Gabon, Guinea-Bissau, Honduras, Indonesia, Iran, Israel, Jamaica, Jordan, Kazakhstan, Kenya, Lebanon, Namibia, Netherlands, Nicaragua, Norway, Palestine, Panama, Senegal, Syria, Saudi Arabia, Suriname, Tanzania, Trinidad and Tobago, Turkey, United Arab Emirates, Vietnam and Zambia
- Two: Angola, Belgium, Cape Verde, Ghana, Japan, Libya, Nigeria, Qatar, São Tomé and Príncipe, South Korea, Sweden, Ukraine and Vatican
- Three: China, Denmark, Germany, Guatemala, Guyana, Haiti, India and Mozambique
- Four: Cuba, El Salvador, Russia, South Africa
- Five: Ecuador and Mexico
- Six: Colombia, Italy, Portugal, Spain and United Kingdom
- Seven: France, Peru and Switzerland
- Eight: Bolivia, Chile and Paraguay
- Nine: Uruguay
- Twelve: United States
- Thirteen: Venezuela
- Eighteen: Argentina

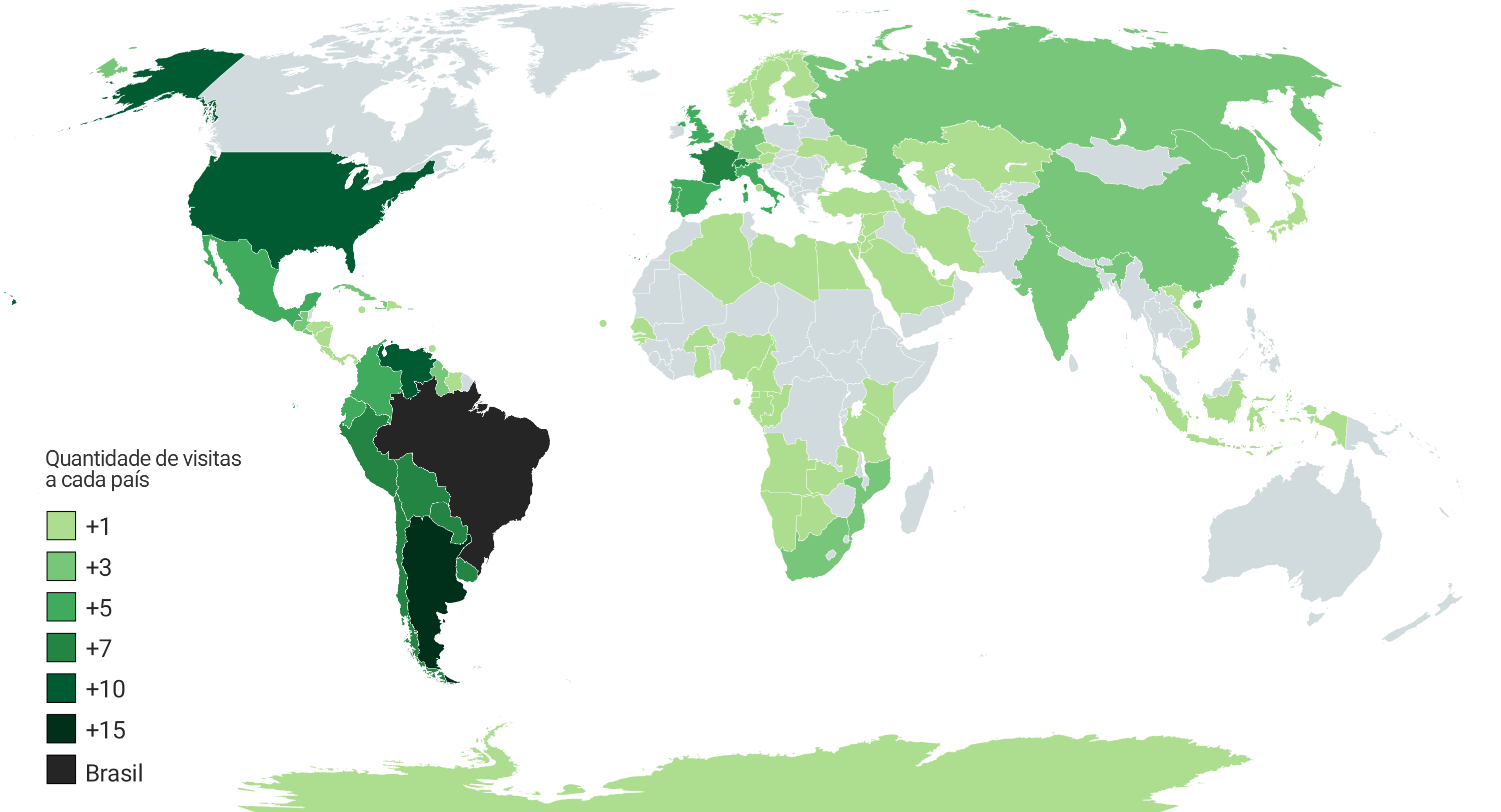
Map of international trips made by President Lula: (1st presidency)

=== 2003 ===
	Country	Areas visited	Dates	Details	Image
1	Argentina	Buenos Aires	14–15 January	Met with President Eduardo Duhalde.	
1	Ecuador	Quito	15 January	Attended the inauguration of President Lucio Gutiérrez.	
2	Switzerland	Davos	23–26 January	Attended the World Economic Forum.	
2	Germany	Berlin	26–27 January	State visit.	
2	France	Paris	28–29 January	State visit.	
3	Peru	Cusco	22–23 May	Attended the Rio Group summit.	
3	Argentina	Buenos Aires	24–25 May	Attended the inauguration of President Néstor Kirchner.	
4	Switzerland	Lausanne	30 May–1 June		
4	France	Évian-les-Bains	1–2 June	Invited to attend the 29th G8 summit.	
4	Switzerland	Geneva	2–3 June		
5	Colombia	Bogotá	27–28 June	Met with President Álvaro Uribe.	
6	Portugal	Lisbon	9–10 July	State visit.	
6	United Kingdom	London	10–13 July		
6	Spain	Madrid	13–16 July	State visit.	
7	Paraguay	Asunción	14–15 August	Attended the inauguration of President Nicanor Duarte. Attended the Mercosur summit.	
8	Peru	Lima	24–25 August	State visit.	
8	Venezuela	Caracas and Ciudad Guayana.	26–27 August	State visit.	
9	Colombia	Cartagena, Colombia	16 September		
10	United States	New York City	22–23 September	Addressed the fifty-eighth session of the United Nations General Assembly.	
10	Mexico	Mexico City	23–24 September	State visit.	
10	Cuba	Havana	25–26 September	Met with Fidel Castro.	
11	Spain	Oviedo	24 October		
12	São Tomé and Príncipe	São Tomé	2–3 November	State visit.	
12	Angola	Luanda	3–4 November	Official visit.	
12	Mozambique	Maputo	4–5 November	Official visit.	
12	Namibia	Windhoek	5–6 November	State visit.	
12	South Africa	Pretoria	6–8 November	Met with President Thabo Mbeki.	
13	Bolivia	Santa Cruz de la Sierra	14–15 November	Attended the 13th Ibero-American summit.	
14	Syria	Damascus	3–4 December	Met with President Bashar al-Assad.	
14	Lebanon	Beirut	4–5 December	Met with President Émile Lahoud.	
14	United Arab Emirates	Abu Dhabi	6–7 December	Met with Sheikh Zayed bin Sultan Al Nahyan	
14	Egypt	Cairo	8–9 December	Met with President Hosni Mubarak.	
14	Libya	Tripoli	9–10 December	Met with Leader Muammar Gaddafi.	
15	Uruguay	Montevideo	15–16 December	Attended the 24th Mercosur summit.	

=== 2004 ===
	Country	Areas visited	Dates	Details	Image
16	Mexico	Monterrey	12–13 January	Attended the Monterrey Special Summit of the Americas.	
17	India	New Delhi, Agra and Mumbai.	25–28 January	Met with President A. P. J. Abdul Kalam and Prime Minister Atal Bihari Vajpayee.	
17	Switzerland	Geneva	29–30 January		
18	Venezuela	Caracas	26–28 February	Met with President Hugo Chávez. Attended the 12th G-15 summit.	
19	Ukraine	Kyiv	22 May	Met with President Leonid Kuchma.	
19	China	Beijing and Shanghai	22–26 May	Official visit.	
19	Mexico	Guadalajara	27–28 May	Attended the European Union, Latin America and the Caribbean summit.	
20	United States	New York City	22–24 June	Working visit.	
21	Argentina	Puerto Iguazú	8 July	Attended the Mercosur summit.	
22	São Tomé and Príncipe	São Tomé	26–27 July	Attended the 5th CPLP Summit.	
22	Gabon	Libreville	27–28 July	Met with President Omar Bongo.	
22	Cape Verde	Sal Island	28–29 July	Official visit.	
23	Bolivia	Bolivia–Brazil border	11 August		
24	Paraguay	Asunción	13 August		
25	Dominican Republic	Santo Domingo	15–18 August	Attended the inauguration of President Leonel Fernández.	
25	Haiti	Port-au-Prince	18 August	Met with President Boniface Alexandre and Prime Minister Gérard Latortue.	
26	Chile	Santiago	23–24 August		
26	Ecuador	Quito	24–25 August	Met with President Lucio Gutiérrez.	
27	United States	New York City	20–21 September	Addressed the fifty-ninth session of the United Nations General Assembly.	
28	Peru	Cusco	8 December	Met with President Alejandro Toledo. Attended the 2004 South American Summit.	

=== 2005 ===
	Country	Areas visited	Dates	Details	Image
29	Colombia	Leticia	19 January	Met with President Álvaro Uribe.	
30	Venezuela	Caracas	13–15 February	Met with President Hugo Chávez.	
30	Guyana	Georgetown	15 February	Official visit.	
30	Suriname	Paramaribo	15–16 February	Official visit.	
31	Uruguay	Montevideo	1–2 March	Attended the inauguration of President Tabaré Vázquez.	
32	Venezuela	Ciudad Guayana	29 March	Met with President Hugo Chávez.	
33	Italy	Rome	8–10 April		
33	Vatican City		8 April	Attended the funeral of Pope John Paul II.	
33	Cameroon	Yaoundé	10–11 April	Met with President Paul Biya.	
33	Nigeria	Abuja	11–12 April	Met with President Olusegun Obasanjo.	
33	Ghana	Accra	12–13 April	Met with President John Kufuor.	
33	Guinea-Bissau	Bissau	13 April	Met with President Henrique Rosa and Prime Minister Carlos Gomes Junior.	
33	Senegal	Dakar	13–14 April	Met with President Abdoulaye Wade.	
34	South Korea	Seoul	23–25 May	Met with President Roh Moo-hyun.	
34	Japan	Tokyo	25–28 May	Met with Emperor Akihito and Prime Minister Junichiro Koizumi.	
35	Paraguay	Asunción	19–20 June	Met with President Nicanor Duarte.	
36	United Kingdom	Auchterarder	7 July	Invited to attend the 31st G8 summit.	
37	France	Paris	12–15 July	Met with President Jacques Chirac.	
38	Peru	Puerto Maldonado	8 September	Met with President Alejandro Toledo.	
39	Guatemala	Guatemala City	12–13 September	Met with President Óscar Berger.	
39	United States	New York City	13–15 September	Addressed the 60th session of the United Nations General Assembly.	
40	Portugal	Porto	13 October	Met with Prime Minister José Sócrates.	
40	Spain	Salamanca	14–15 October	Attended the 15th Ibero-American summit.	
40	Italy	Rome	16–17 October	Met with President Carlo Azeglio Ciampi.	
40	Russia	Moscow	18 October	Met with President Vladimir Putin.	
41	Argentina	Mar del Plata	4–5 November	Met with President Néstor Kirchner. Attended the 4th Summit of the Americas.	
42	Argentina	Puerto Iguazú	30 November	Met with President Néstor Kirchner.	
43	Uruguay	Montevideo	8–9 December	Met with President Tabaré Vázquez. Attended the Mercosur summit.	
44	Colombia	Bogotá	14 December	Met with President Álvaro Uribe.	

=== 2006 ===
	Country	Areas visited	Dates	Details	Image
45	Argentina	Buenos Aires	18–19 January	Met with Argentine president Néstor Kirchner and Venezuelan president Hugo Chávez.	
46	Bolivia	La Paz	22 January	Attended the inauguration of President Evo Morales.	
47	Algeria	Algiers	8–9 February	Met with President Abdelaziz Bouteflika.	
47	Botswana	Gaborone	11 February	Met with President Festus Mogae.	
47	South Africa	Johannesburg	11–12 February		
48	United Kingdom	London	7–9 March	Met with Queen Elizabeth II and Prime Minister Tony Blair.	
49	Chile	Valparaíso and Viña del Mar.	11 March	Attended the inauguration of President Michelle Bachelet.	
50	Argentina	Puerto Iguazú	4 May	Met with Argentine president Néstor Kirchner, Venezuelan president Hugo Chávez and Bolivian president Evo Morales.	
51	Austria	Vienna	12–14 May	Attended the 4th EU-LAC summit.	
52	Venezuela	Caracas	4 July		
53	Russia	Saint Petersburg	16–17 July	Met with President Vladimir Putin. Attended the 32nd G8 summit.	
54	Argentina	Córdoba	20–21 July	Attended the Mercosur summit.	
55	Peru	Lima	27–28 July	Attended the inauguration of President Alan García.	
56	United States	New York City	18–20 September	Addressed the 61st session of the United Nations General Assembly.	
57	Venezuela	Ciudad Guayana	13 November	Met with President Hugo Chávez.	
58	Nigeria	Abuja	29–30 November	Attended the 1st Africa-South America summit.	
59	Bolivia	Cochabamba	8–9 December	Met with President Evo Morales.	

=== 2007 ===
	Country	Areas visited	Dates	Details	Image
60	Ecuador	Quito	15 January	Attended the inauguration of President Rafael Correa.	
61	Switzerland	Davos	24–26 January	Attended the World Economic Forum.	
62	Uruguay	Montevideo	26 February	Met with President Tabaré Vázquez.	
63	Guyana	Georgetown	2–3 March	Met with President Bharrat Jagdeo. Attended the 19th summit of the Rio Group.	
64	United States	Washington, D.C.	30–31 March	Met with President George W. Bush.	
65	Venezuela	Barcelona and Margarita Island	16–17 April	Met with President Hugo Chávez.	
66	Chile	Santiago	25–26 April	Met with President Michelle Bachelet.	
66	Argentina	Buenos Aires	27 April	Met with President Néstor Kirchner.	
67	Paraguay	Asunción	20–21 May	Met with President Nicanor Duarte.	
68	United Kingdom	London	1–2 June		
68	India	New Delhi	3–5 June	Met with President A. P. J. Abdul Kalam and Prime Minister Manmohan Singh.	
68	Germany	Berlin and Heiligendamm	5–8 June	Met with Chancellor Angela Merkel. Attended the 33rd G8 summit.	
69	Paraguay	Asunción	28–29 June	Met with President Nicanor Duarte. Attended the Mercosur summit.	
70	Portugal	Lisbon	4 July	Met with President Aníbal Cavaco Silva.	
70	Belgium	Brussels	5 July		
71	Mexico	Mexico City	5–7 August	Met with President Felipe Calderón.	
71	Honduras	Tegucigalpa	7 August	Met with President Manuel Zelaya.	
71	Nicaragua	Managua	7–8 August	Met with President Daniel Ortega.	
71	Jamaica	Kingston	9 August	Met with Prime Minister Portia Simpson-Miller.	
71	Panama	Panama City	10–11 August	Met with President Martín Torrijos.	
72	Finland	Helsinki	9–10 September	Met with President Tarja Halonen and Prime Minister Matti Vanhanen.	
72	Sweden	Stockholm	11–12 September	Met with King Carl XVI Gustaf.	
72	Denmark	Copenhagen	12–13 September	Met with Queen Margrethe II.	
72	Norway	Helsinki	13–14 September	Met with King Harald V.	
72	Spain	Madrid	15–17 September	Met with King Juan Carlos I and Prime Minister José Luis Rodríguez Zapatero.	
73	United States	New York City	24–25 September	Addressed the 62nd session of the United Nations General Assembly.	
74	Burkina Faso	Ouagadougou	15 October	Met with President Blaise Compaoré.	
74	Republic of the Congo	Brazzaville	15 October	Met with President Denis Sassou Nguesso.	
74	South Africa	Pretoria	17 October	Met with South African president Thabo Mbeki and Indian prime minister Manmohan Singh. Attended the 2nd IBSA summit.	
74	Angola	Luanda	17–18 October	Met with President José Eduardo dos Santos.	
75	Switzerland	Zurich	30 October	Met with President Micheline Calmy-Rey.	
76	Chile	Santiago	8–10 November	Met with President Michelle Bachelet. Attended the 17th Ibero-American summit.	
77	Argentina	Buenos Aires	9–10 December	Attended the inauguration of President Cristina Fernández de Kirchner.	
78	Venezuela	Caracas	13 December	Met with President Hugo Chávez.	
79	Bolivia	La Paz	16–17 December	Met with President Evo Morales.	
79	Uruguay	Montevideo	17–18 December	Met with President Tabaré Vázquez. Attended the Mercosur summit.	

=== 2008 ===
	Country	Areas visited	Dates	Details	Image
80	Guatemala	Guatemala City	14–15 January	Attended the inauguration of President Álvaro Colom.	
80	Cuba	Havana	15–16 January	Met with Fidel Castro and Raúl Castro.	
81	France	Saint-Georges, French Guiana	12 February	Met with French president Nicolas Sarkozy.	
82	Chile	Punta Arenas	15–17 February		
82	Antarctica	King George Island	17 February	Visited the Comandante Ferraz Antarctic Station.	
83	Argentina	Buenos Aires	22–23 February	Met with President Cristina Fernández de Kirchner.	
84	Netherlands	The Hague and Amsterdam.	9–11 April	Met with Queen Beatrix and Prime Minister Jan Peter Balkenende.	
84	Czech Republic	Prague	12 April	Met with President Václav Klaus.	
85	Ghana	Accra	19–21 April	Met with President John Kufuor.	
86	Peru	Lima	16–17 May	Met with President Alan García. Attended the European Union, Latin America and the Caribbean Summit.	
87	Haiti	Port-au-Prince	28 May	Met with President René Préval.	
87	El Salvador	San Salvador	29 May	Met with President Antonio Saca.	
87	Italy	Rome	May 31–3 June		
88	Venezuela	Caracas	27 June	Met with President Hugo Chávez.	
89	Argentina	San Miguel de Tucumán	30 June–1 July	Met with President Cristina Fernández de Kirchner. Attended the Mercosur summit.	
90	Japan	Tōyako	7–9 July	Attended the 34th G8 summit.	
90	Vietnam	Hanoi	10 July	Met with President Nguyễn Minh Triết.	
90	Timor-Leste	Dili	11 July	Met with President José Ramos-Horta.	
90	Indonesia	Jakarta	12 July	Met with President Susilo Bambang Yudhoyono.	
91	Bolivia	Riberalta	18 July		
92	Colombia	Bogotá and Leticia	19–20 July	Met with President Álvaro Uribe.	
93	Portugal	Lisbon	24–26 July	Met with Prime Minister José Sócrates. Attended the CPLP summit.	
94	Argentina	Buenos Aires	3–4 August	Met with President Cristina Fernández de Kirchner.	
95	China	Beijing	8–10 August	Met with President Hu Jintao.	
96	Paraguay	Asunción	15 August	Attended the inauguration of President Fernando Lugo.	
97	Chile	Santiago	15 September	Attended the UNASUR summit.	
98	United States	New York City	22–23 September	Addressed the 63rd session of the United Nations General Assembly.	
99	Spain	Madrid and Toledo	13 October	Met with King Juan Carlos I and Prime Minister José Luis Rodríguez Zapatero.	
99	India	New Delhi	14–15 October	Attended the IBSA summit.	
99	Mozambique	Maputo	16–17 October	Met with President Armando Guebuza.	
100	El Salvador	San Salvador	30 October	Attended the Ibero-American summit.	
100	Cuba	Havana	31 October		
101	Italy	Rome	19–13 November	Met with President Giorgio Napolitano and Prime Minister Silvio Berlusconi.	
101	Vatican City		13 November	Met with Pope Benedict XVI.	
101	United States	Washington, D.C.	13–15 November	Met with President George W. Bush. Attended the 1st G20 summit.	

=== 2009 ===
	Country	Areas visited	Dates	Details	Image
102	Bolivia	Arroyo Concepción	15 January		
102	Venezuela	Maracaibo	16 January	Met with President Hugo Chávez.	
103	United States	Washington, D.C. and New York City	13–16 March	Met with President Barack Obama.	
104	Chile	Viña del Mar	27–28 March	Met with President Michelle Bachelet.	
104	Qatar	Doha	30–31 March	Met with Sheikh Hamad bin Khalifa Al Thani. Attended the second summit of Arab and South American Countries.	
104	France	Paris	1 April	Met with President Nicolas Sarkozy.	
104	United Kingdom	London	1–3 April	Met with Queen Elizabeth II and Prime Minister Gordon Brown. Attended the 2nd G20 summit.	
105	Trinidad and Tobago	Port of Spain	17–19 April	Attended the 5th Summit of the Americas.	
106	Argentina	Buenos Aires	22–23 April	Met with President Cristina Fernández de Kirchner.	
107	Saudi Arabia	Riyadh	16–17 May	Met with King Abdullah of Saudi Arabia.	
107	China	Beijing	18–20 May	Met with President Hu Jintao.	
107	Turkey	Istanbul and Ankara	20–22 May	Met with President Abdullah Gül and Prime Minister Recep Tayyip Erdoğan.	
108	El Salvador	San Salvador	1 June	Attended the inauguration of President Mauricio Funes.	
108	Guatemala	Guatemala City	2 June	Met with President Álvaro Colom.	
108	Costa Rica	San Jose	3 June	Met with President Óscar Arias.	
109	Switzerland	Geneva	15 June		
109	Russia	Yekaterinburg	16 June	Met with Russian president Dmitry Medvedev, Chinese president Hu Jintao and Indian prime minister Manmohan Singh. Attended the 1st BRIC summit.	
109	Kazakhstan	Astana	17 June	Met with President Nursultan Nazarbayev.	
110	Libya	Tripoli and Sirte	30 June–1 July	Met with Leader Muammar Gaddafi. Invited to attend the 13th African Union summit.	
111	France	Paris	4–7 July	Met with President Nicolas Sarkozy.	
111	Italy	La Maddalena	8–10 July	Met with President Giorgio Napolitano and Prime Minister Silvio Berlusconi. Attended the 35th G8 summit.	
112	Paraguay	Asunción	24–25 July	Met with President Fernando Lugo. Attended the Mercosur summit.	
113	Ecuador	Quito	10 August	Met with President Rafael Correa. Attended the UNASUR summit.	
114	Bolivia	Chimoré	22 August	Met with President Evo Morales.	
115	Argentina	Bariloche	27–28 August	Met with President Cristina Fernández de Kirchner. Attended the 3rd UNASUR summit.	
116	United States	New York City and Pittsburgh	21–25 September	Met with President Barack Obama. Addressed the sixty-fourth session of the United Nations General Assembly. Attended the 3rd G20 summit.	
116	Venezuela	Margarita Island	26–27 September	Met with President Hugo Chávez. Attended the 2nd Africa-South America summit.	
117	Denmark	Copenhagen	30 September–3 October	Met with Queen Margrethe II and Prime Minister Lars Løkke Rasmussen.	
117	Belgium	Brussels	4–5 October	Met with King Albert II and Prime Minister Herman Van Rompuy.	
117	Sweden	Stockholm	6 October	Met with Queen Silvia and Prime Minister Fredrik Reinfeldt.	
118	Venezuela	Caracas and El Tigre	29–30 October	Met with President Hugo Chávez.	
119	United Kingdom	London	4–5 November	Met with Queen Elizabeth II and Prime Minister Gordon Brown.	
120	France	Paris	14 November	Met with President Nicolas Sarkozy.	
120	Italy	Rome	15–16 November		
121	Portugal	Lisbon and Estoril	29–30 November	Met with President Aníbal Cavaco Silva and Prime Minister José Sócrates. Attended the Ibero-American summit.	
121	Ukraine	Kyiv	1–2 December	Met with President Viktor Yushchenko.	
121	Germany	Berlin	3–4 December	Met with Chancellor Angela Merkel.	
122	Uruguay	Montevideo	8 December	Attended the Mercosur summit.	
123	Peru	Lima	10–11 December	Met with President Alan García.	
124	Denmark	Copenhagen	15–18 December	Met with Queen Margrethe II. Attended the Copenhagen climate summit.	

=== 2010 ===
	Country	Areas visited	Dates	Details	Image
125	Mexico	Playa del Carmen	21–23 February	Met with President Felipe Calderón. Attended the Rio Group summit and the 21st summit of Latin American and Caribbean Unity Summit.	
125	Cuba	Havana	23–24 February	Met with Fidel Castro and Raúl Castro.	
125	Haiti	Port-au-Prince	25 February	Met with President René Préval.	
125	El Salvador	San Salvador	25–26 February	Met with President Mauricio Funes.	
126	Uruguay	Montevideo	1 March	Attended the inauguration of President José Mujica.	
126	Chile	Santiago	1 March	Met with President Michelle Bachelet.	
127	Israel		14–16 March	Met with President Shimon Peres and Prime Minister Benjamin Netanyahu.	
127	Palestine	Bethlehem and Ramallah	16–17 March	Met with President Mahmoud Abbas.	
127	Jordan	Amman	17–18 March	Met with King Abdullah II.	
128	United States	Washington, D.C.	11–13 April	Met with President Barack Obama. Attended the Nuclear Security Summit.	
129	Argentina	Buenos Aires	4 May	Attended the UNASUR summit. Met with President Cristina Fernández de Kirchner.	
129	Uruguay	Montevideo	4 May	Met with President José Mujica.	
130	Russia	Moscow	13–14 May	Met with President Dmitry Medvedev and Prime Minister Vladimir Putin.	
130	Qatar	Doha	14–15 May	Met with Sheikh Hamad bin Khalifa Al Thani	
130	Iran	Tehran	15–17 May	Met with Leader Ali Khamenei and President Mahmoud Ahmadinejad. Attended the 14th G-15 summit.	
130	Spain	Madrid	17–19 May	Met with Prime Minister José Luis Rodríguez Zapatero. Attended the Mercosur summit and the European Union, Latin America and the Caribbean summit.	
130	Portugal	Lisbon	19 May	Met with President Aníbal Cavaco Silva and Prime Minister José Sócrates.	
131	Argentina	Buenos Aires	25 May	Met with President Cristina Fernández de Kirchner.	
132	Cape Verde	Sal Island	2–3 July	Met with President Pedro Pires and Prime Minister José Brito. Attended the Brazil-ECOWAS summit.	
132	Equatorial Guinea	Malabo	4–5 July	Met with President Teodoro Obiang Nguema Mbasogo.	
132	Kenya	Nairobi	6 July	Met with President Mwai Kibaki.	
132	Tanzania	Dar es Salaam	7 July	Met with President Jakaya Kikwete.	
132	Zambia	Lusaka	7–8 July	Met with President Rupiah Banda.	
132	South Africa	Johannesburg and Pretoria	8–9 July	Met with President Jacob Zuma.	
133	Uruguay	Rivera	30 July	Met with President José Mujica.	
133	Paraguay	Asunción	30 July	Met with President Fernando Lugo.	
134	Argentina	San Juan	3 August	Met with President Cristina Fernández de Kirchner. Attended the Mercosur summit.	
135	Venezuela	Caracas	6 August		
135	Colombia	Bogotá	6–7 August	Attended the inauguration of President Juan Manuel Santos.	
136	Argentina	Buenos Aires	28 October	Attended the funeral of Néstor Kirchner.	
137	Mozambique	Maputo	9–10 November	Met with President Armando Guebuza.	
137	South Korea	Seoul	11–12 November	Met with President Lee Myung-bak. Attended the 5th G20 summit.	
138	Guyana	Georgetown	25–26 November	Met with President Bharrat Jagdeo. Attended the UNASUR summit.	
139	Argentina	Mar del Plata	3–4 December	Met with President Cristina Fernández de Kirchner. Attended the Ibero-American summit.	

== Second presidency (2023–present) ==
Number of visits per country during Lula's second presidency:

- One: Angola, Belgium, Bolivia, Canada, Cape Verde, Cuba, Egypt, Ethiopia, Germany, Guyana, Honduras, Indonesia, Malaysia, Mexico, Monaco, Mozambique, Panama, Philippines, Portugal, Qatar, Russia, Saint Vincent and the Grenadines, São Tomé and Príncipe, Saudi Arabia, South Korea, Spain, Switzerland, Turkey, United Kingdom and Vietnam
- Two: Chile, China, France, India, Japan, Paraguay and South Africa
- Three: Argentina, Italy, United Arab Emirates and Vatican City
- Four: Colombia, United States and Uruguay

Map of international trips made by President Lula: (February 2026) 1 visit 2 visits 3 visits 4 visits 5 or more visits Brazil

=== 2023 ===
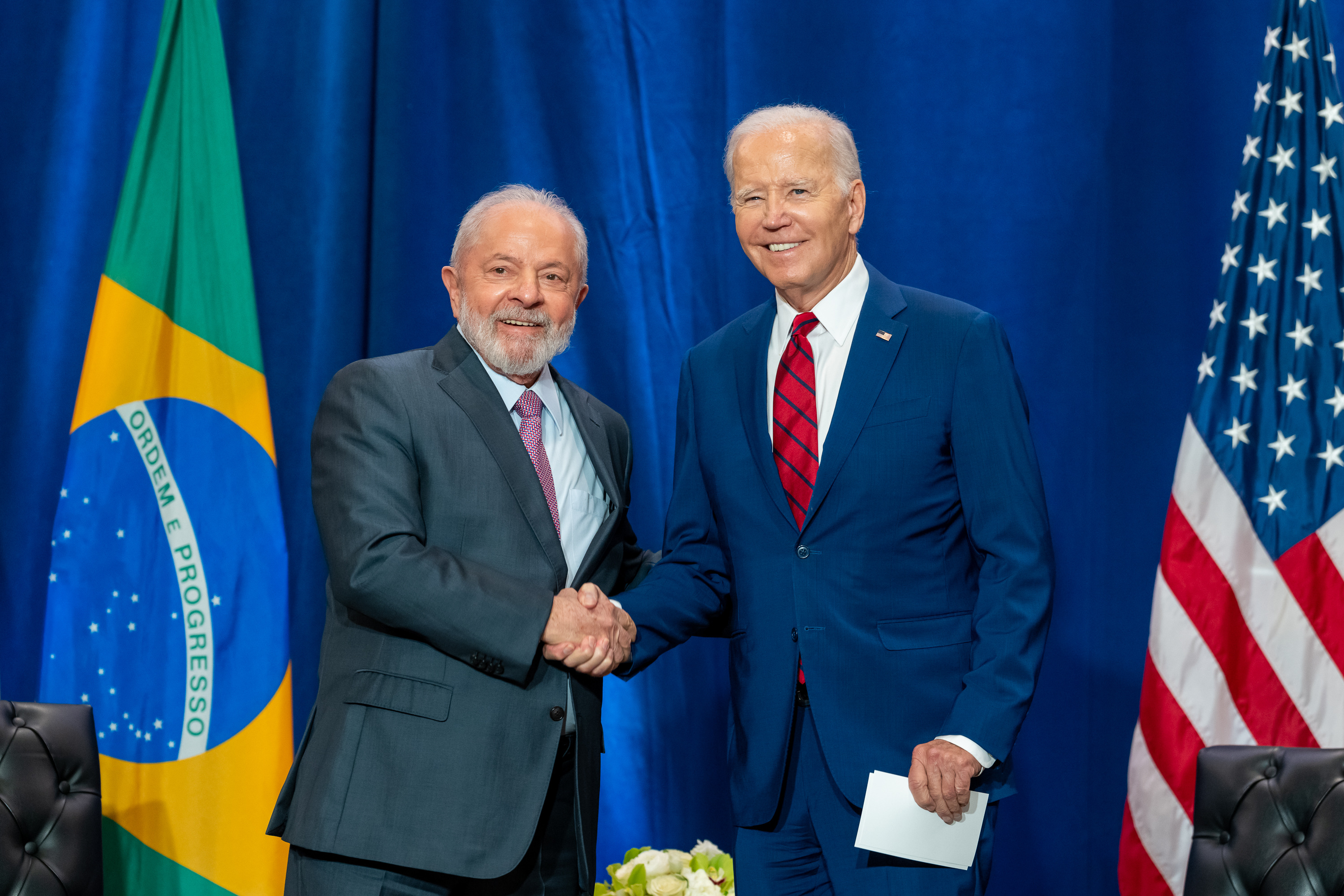
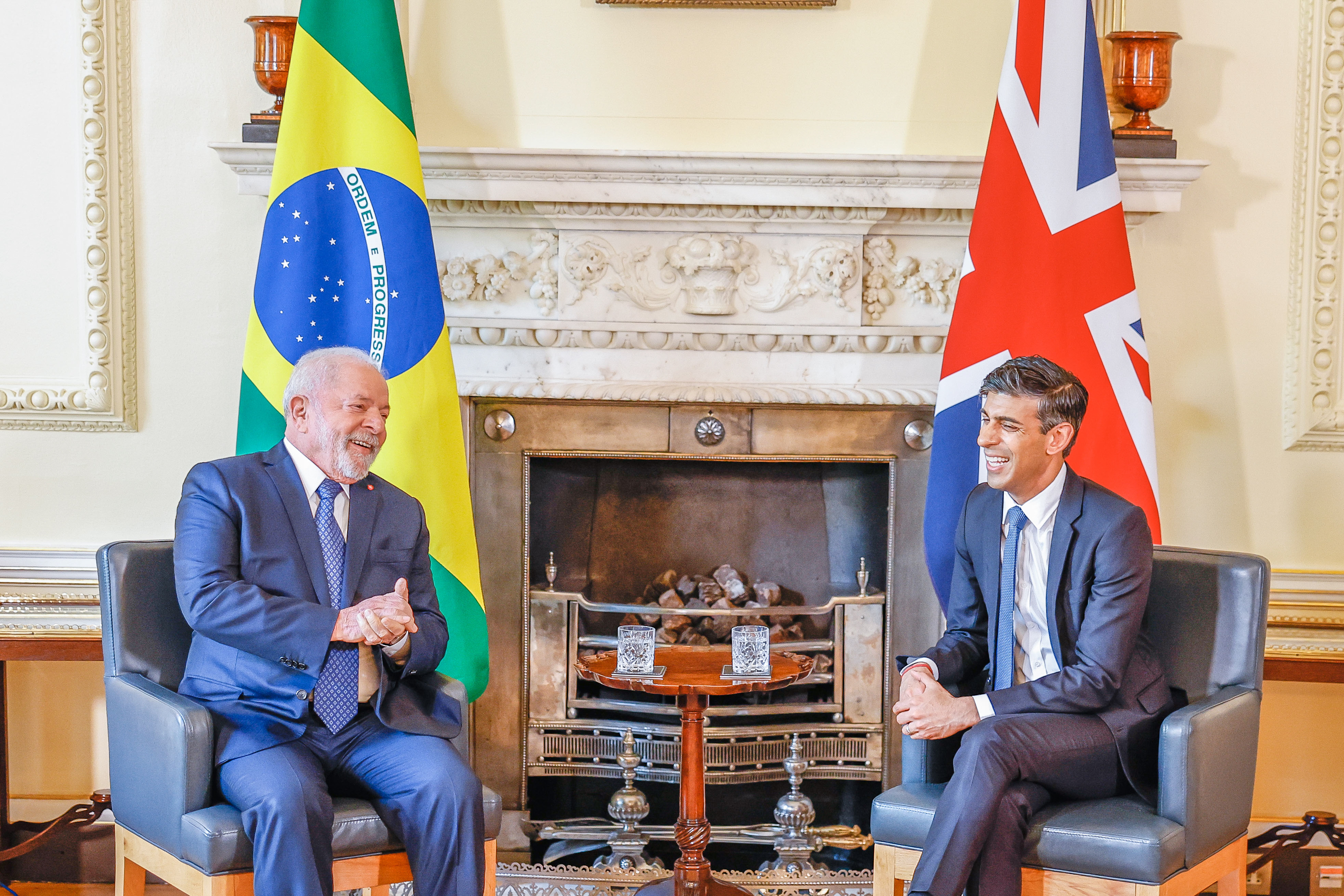
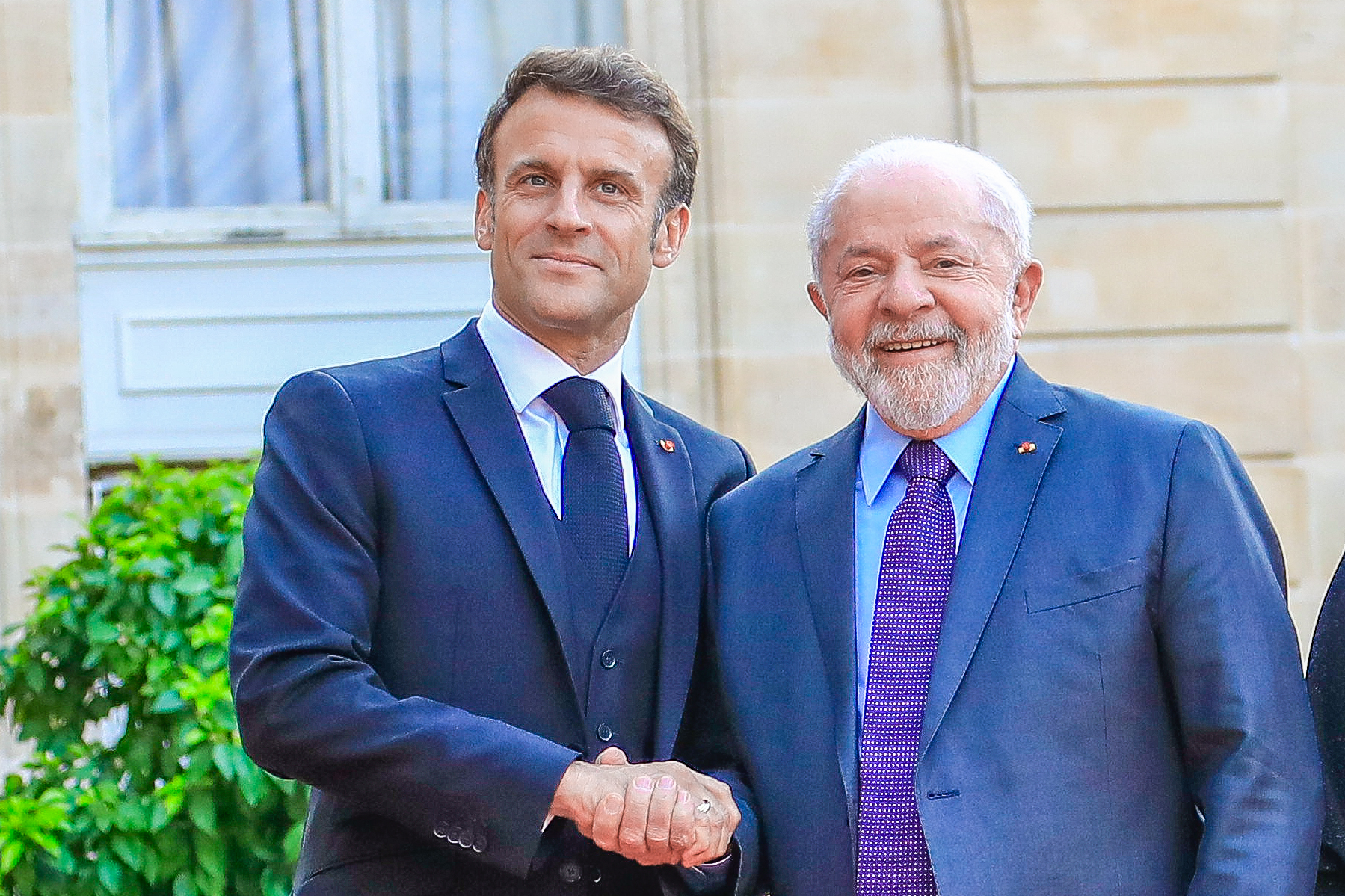
President Lula with Joe Biden, Rishi Sunak and Emmanuel Macron

No.	Country	Areas visited	Dates	Details
1	Argentina	Buenos Aires	22–24 January	Attended the 7th CELAC summit. Held bilateral meetings with Argentine president Alberto Fernández, First Secretary of the Communist Party of Cuba Miguel Díaz-Canel, Barbadian prime minister Mia Amor Mottley, the European Council President Charles Michel and FAO Director General Qu Dongyu.
1	Uruguay	Montevideo	25 January	Met with President Luis Lacalle Pou. Awarded with the Más Verde Prize by the Mayor of Montevideo, Carolina Cosse.
2	United States	Washington D.C.	9–10 February	Met with President Joe Biden.
3	China	Beijing, Shanghai	11–14 April	Main article: 2023 Brazil–China summit Met with President, General Secretary of the Chinese Communist Party Xi Jinping and Premier Li Qiang. Attended the inauguration of Dilma Rousseff as President of the BRICS Bank. Visited the Huawei Shanghai Research Center.
3	United Arab Emirates	Abu Dhabi	15 April	Met with Sheikh Mohammed bin Zayed Al Nahyan.
4	Portugal	Lisbon, Matosinhos	20–25 April	Attended the 13th Luso-Brazilian summit. Met with President Marcelo Rebelo de Sousa and Prime Minister António Costa. Addressed Parliament at the São Bento Palace. Visited the Jerónimos Monastery.
4	Spain	Madrid	25–26 April	Met with King Felipe VI and Prime Minister Pedro Sánchez.
5	United Kingdom	Buckingham Palace, Westminster Abbey, London	5–6 May	Attended the Coronation of Charles III and Camilla. Met with Prime Minister Rishi Sunak.
6	Japan	Hiroshima	17–21 May	Attended the 49th G7 summit. Held bilateral meetings with Japanese prime minister Fumio Kishida, French president Emmanuel Macron, Indonesian president Joko Widodo, Australian prime minister Anthony Albanese, German chancellor Olaf Scholz, Comorian president Azali Assoumani, Canadian prime minister Justin Trudeau, Indian prime minister Narendra Modi, Vietnamese prime minister Phạm Minh Chính, IMF Director General Kristalina Georgieva and UN Secretary General António Guterres. Visited the Hiroshima Peace Memorial Park.
7	Italy	Rome	20–21 June	Met with Prime Minister Giorgia Meloni and President Sergio Mattarella.
7	Vatican	Vatican City	21 June	Met with Pope Francis at the Apostolic Palace.
7	France	Paris	21–22 June	Addressed for the Global Citizen community at the Power Our Planet festival and for New Global Financing Pact summit. Held bilateral meetings with French president Emmanuel Macron, First Secretary of the Communist Party of Cuba Miguel Díaz-Canel and South African president Cyril Ramaphosa.
8	Argentina	Puerto Iguazú	3–4 July	Attended the Mercosur summit.
9	Colombia	Leticia	8 July	Attended the Amazon Technical-Scientific summit. Met with President Gustavo Petro.
10	Belgium	Brussels	16–18 July	Attended the CELAC–European Union summit.
10	Cape Verde	Praia	19 July	Met with President José Maria Neves of his way back to Brazil.
11	Paraguay	Asunción	14–15 August	Attended the inauguration ceremony of the president-elect, Santiago Peña.
12	South Africa	Johannesburg	22–24 August	Attended the 15th BRICS summit. Held bilateral meetings with South African president Cyril Ramaphosa, Bolivian president Luis Arce, Iranian president Ebrahim Raisi and Bangladeshi Prime Minister Sheikh Hasina.
12	Angola	Luanda	25-26 August	Met with President João Lourenço. Addressed the National Assembly.
12	São Tomé and Príncipe	São Tomé	August 27	Attended CPLP summit. Met with President Carlos Vila Nova.
13	India	New Delhi	8–11 September	Attended the 18th G20 summit. Held bilateral meetings with Indian prime minister Narendra Modi, Dutch prime minister Mark Rutte, French president Emmanuel Macron, Saudi Crown Prince Mohammad bin Salman and the EU Council President Charles Michel.
14	Cuba	Havana	15–16 September	Attended the Group of 77 summit. Met with President and First Secretary of the Communist Party of Cuba Miguel Díaz-Canel.
14	United States	New York City	16–20 September	Attended the 78th United Nations General Assembly. Held bilateral meetings with US president Joe Biden, Swiss president Alain Berset, UN secretary-general António Guterres, Austrian president Alexander Van der Bellen, German chancellor Olaf Scholz, Norwegian prime minister Jonas Gahr Støre, Palestinian president Mahmoud Abbas, Ukrainian president Volodymyr Zelenskyy, World Health Organization director-general Tedros Adhanom Ghebreyesus and Paraguayan president Santiago Peña.
15	Saudi Arabia	Riyadh	28–29 November	Met with Crown Prince Mohammed bin Salman.
15	Qatar	Doha	29–30 November	Met with Emir Tamim bin Hamad Al Thani
15	United Arab Emirates	Dubai	30 November – 4 December	Attended the 2023 United Nations Climate Change Conference. Held bilateral meetings with Israeli president Isaac Herzog, UN Secretary General António Guterres, EU Commission president Ursula von der Leyen, Spanish prime minister Pedro Sanchez, French president Emmanuel Macron and African Union Chairperson Moussa Faki.
15	Germany	Berlin	4–5 December	Met with Chancellor Olaf Scholz and President Frank-Walter Steinmeier.

=== 2024 ===
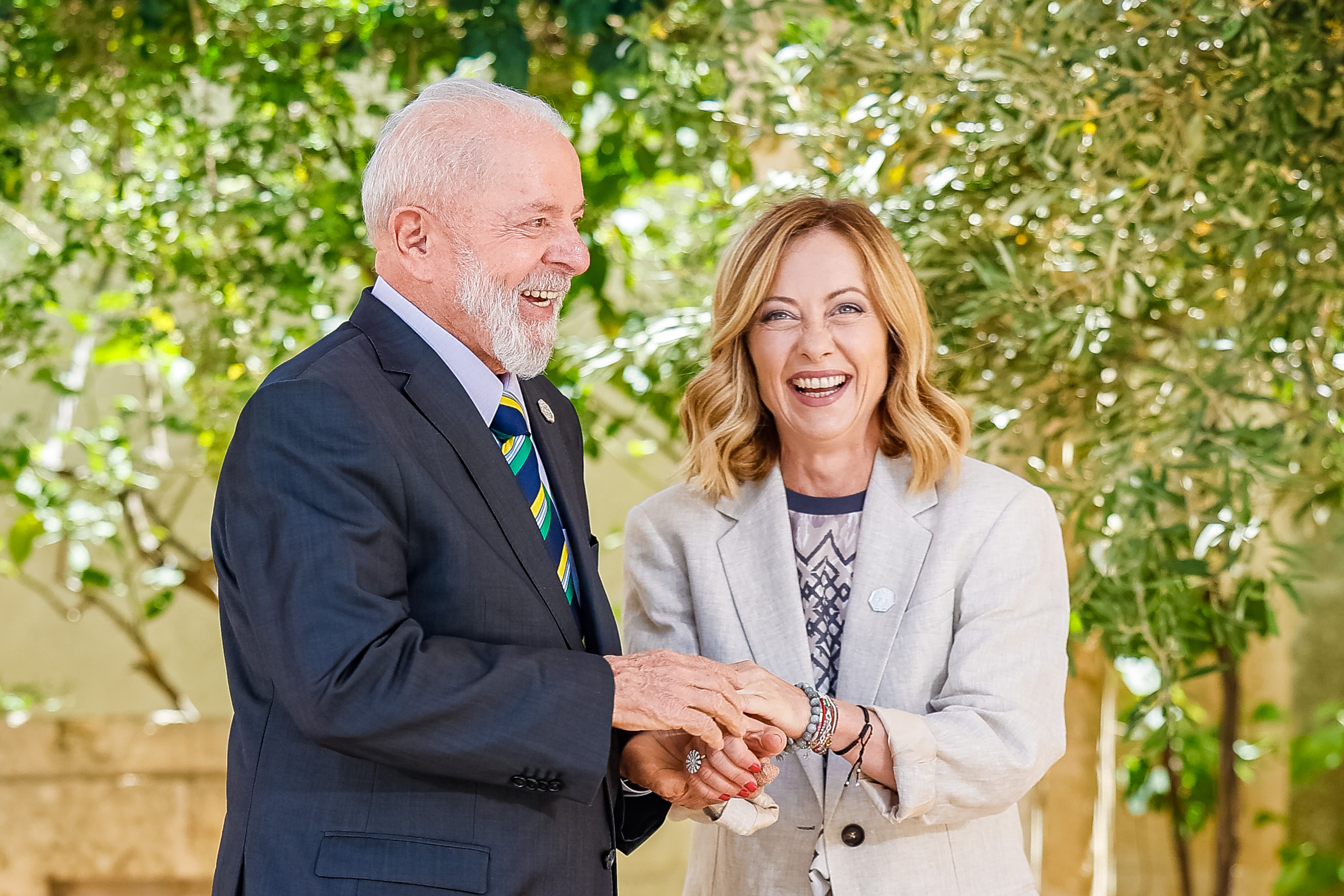
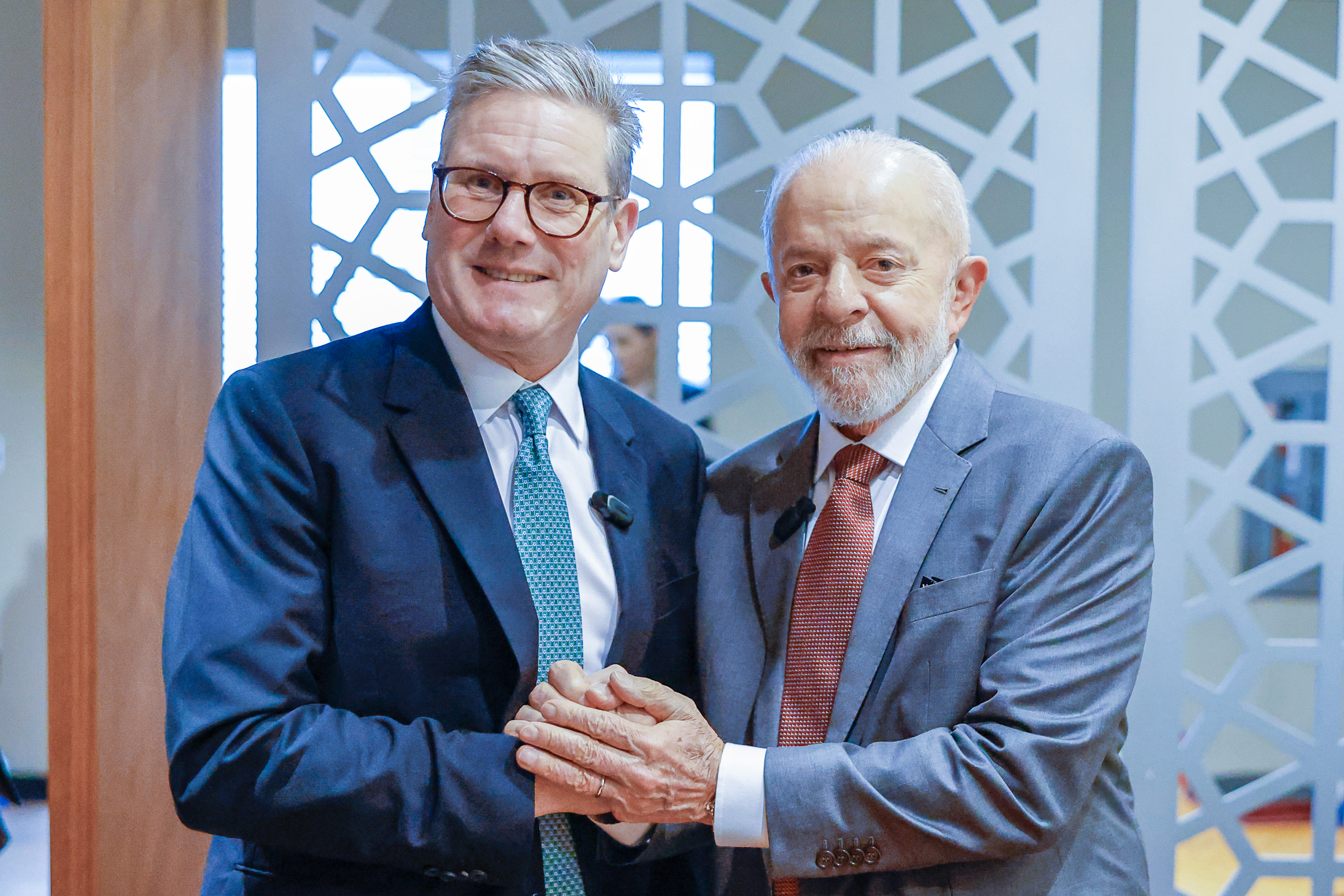
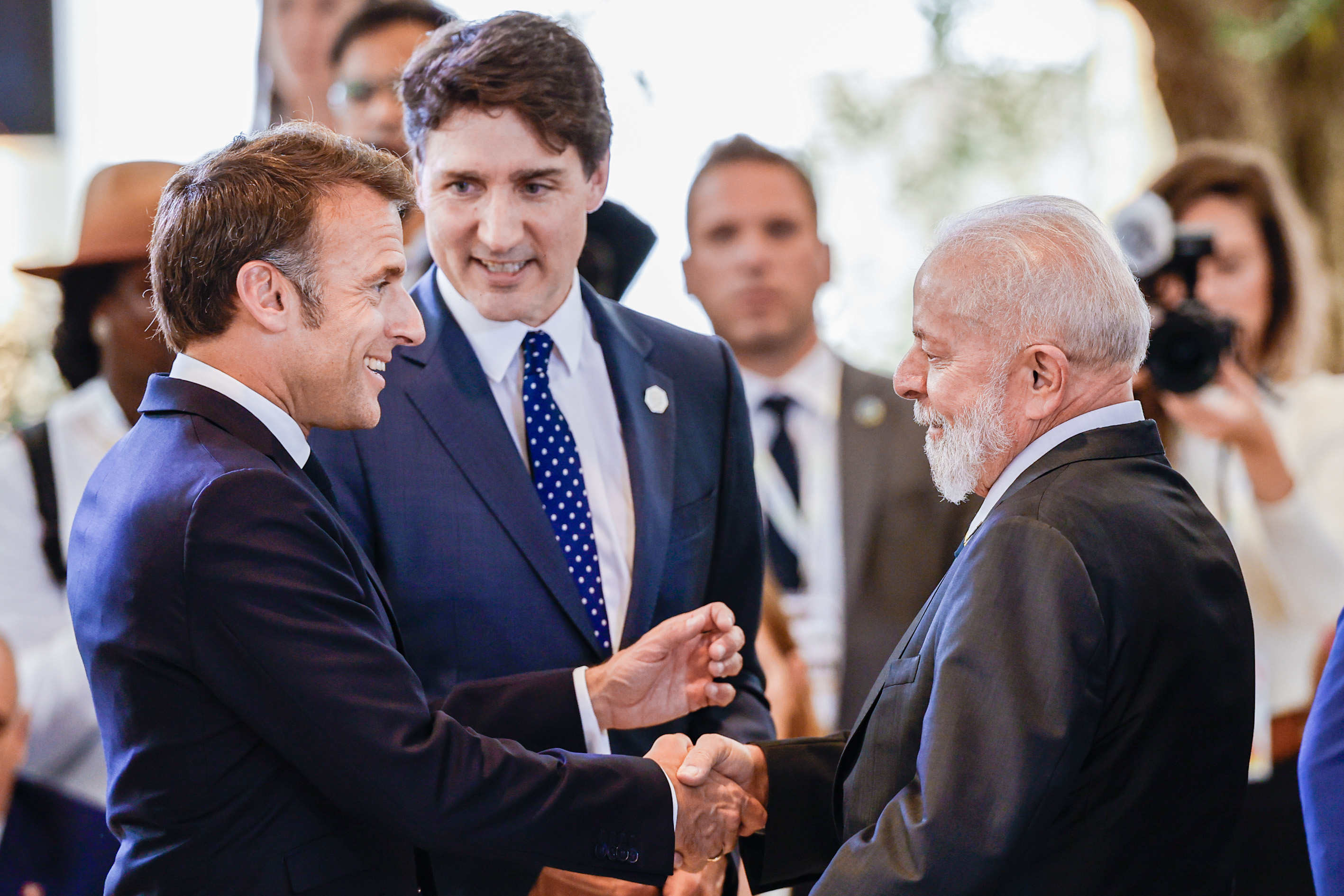
President Lula with Giorgia Meloni, Keir Starmer, Emmanuel Macron and Justin Trudeau

No.	Country	Areas visited	Dates	Details
16	Egypt	Cairo	13–15 February	Met with President Abdel Fattah el-Sisi. Addressed the Arab League.
16	Ethiopia	Addis Ababa	16–18 February	Met with Prime Minister Abiy Ahmed. Attended the 37th African Union summit. Addressed the Pan-African Parliament. Held bilateral meetings with Nigerian president Bola Tinubu, Libyan president Mohamed al-Menfi, Kenyan president William Ruto and Palestinian prime minister Mohammad Shtayyeh.
17	Guyana	Georgetown	28 February	Met with President Irfaan Ali. Attended the 46th CARICOM summit.
17	Saint Vincent and the Grenadines	Kingstown	29 February – 1 March	Attended the 8th CELAC summit. Held bilateral meetings with UN secretary general António Guterres and Venezuelan president Nicolás Maduro.
18	Colombia	Bogotá	17 April	Met with President Gustavo Petro.
19	Switzerland	Geneva	13 June	Met with President Viola Amherd. Attended the 112th International Labour Organization summit.
19	Italy	Fasano	13–15 June	Attended the 50th G7 summit. Held bilateral meetings with Italian prime minister Giorgia Meloni, Pope Francis, French president Emmanuel Macron, Indian prime minister Narendra Modi, the EU Commission president Ursula von der Leyen, Turkish president Recep Tayyip Erdogan and German chancellor Olaf Scholz.
20	Paraguay	Asunción	8 July	Attended the Mercosur summit.
20	Bolivia	Santa Cruz de la Sierra	9 July	Met with President Luis Arce. Awarded with the Key to the City of Santa Cruz de la Sierra.
21	Chile	Santiago	5–6 August	Met with President Gabriel Boric.
22	United States	New York City	21–25 September	Attended the 79th United Nations General Assembly. Held bilateral meetings with German chancellor Olaf Scholz, French president Emmanuel Macron, British prime minister Keir Starmer, EU Commission president Ursula von der Leyen, Spanish prime minister Pedro Sanchez, Haitian prime minister Garry Conille, Palestinian president Mahmoud Abbas, the UN secretary general António Guterres and Jordanian King Abdullah II. Awarded with the 2024 Global Goalkepper Award.
23	Mexico	Mexico City	29 September – 1 October	Met with President Manuel Lopez Obrador. Attended the inauguration ceremony of the president-elect Claudia Sheinbaum.
24	Uruguay	Montevideo	5–7 December	Attended the Mercosur summit.

=== 2025 ===
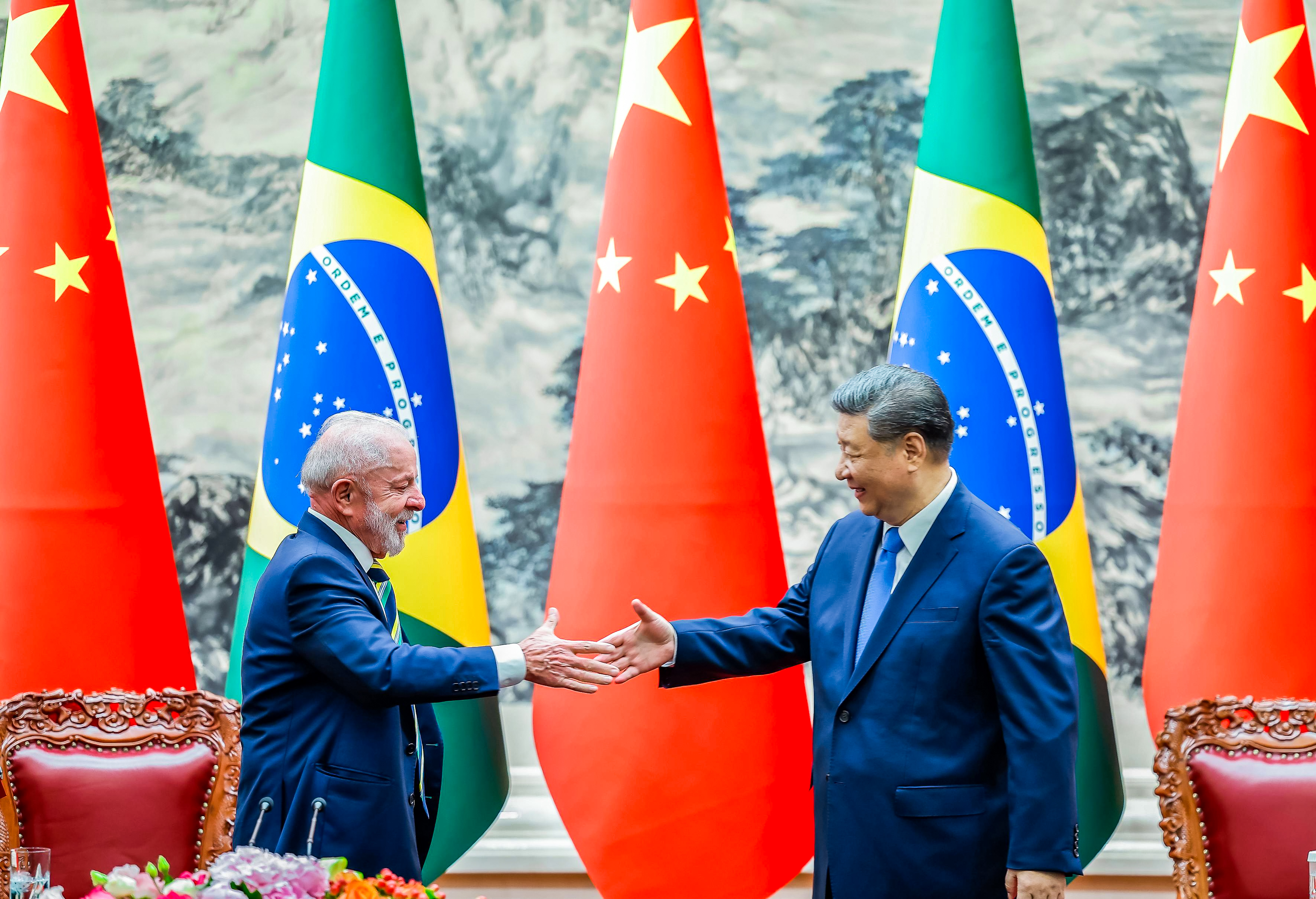
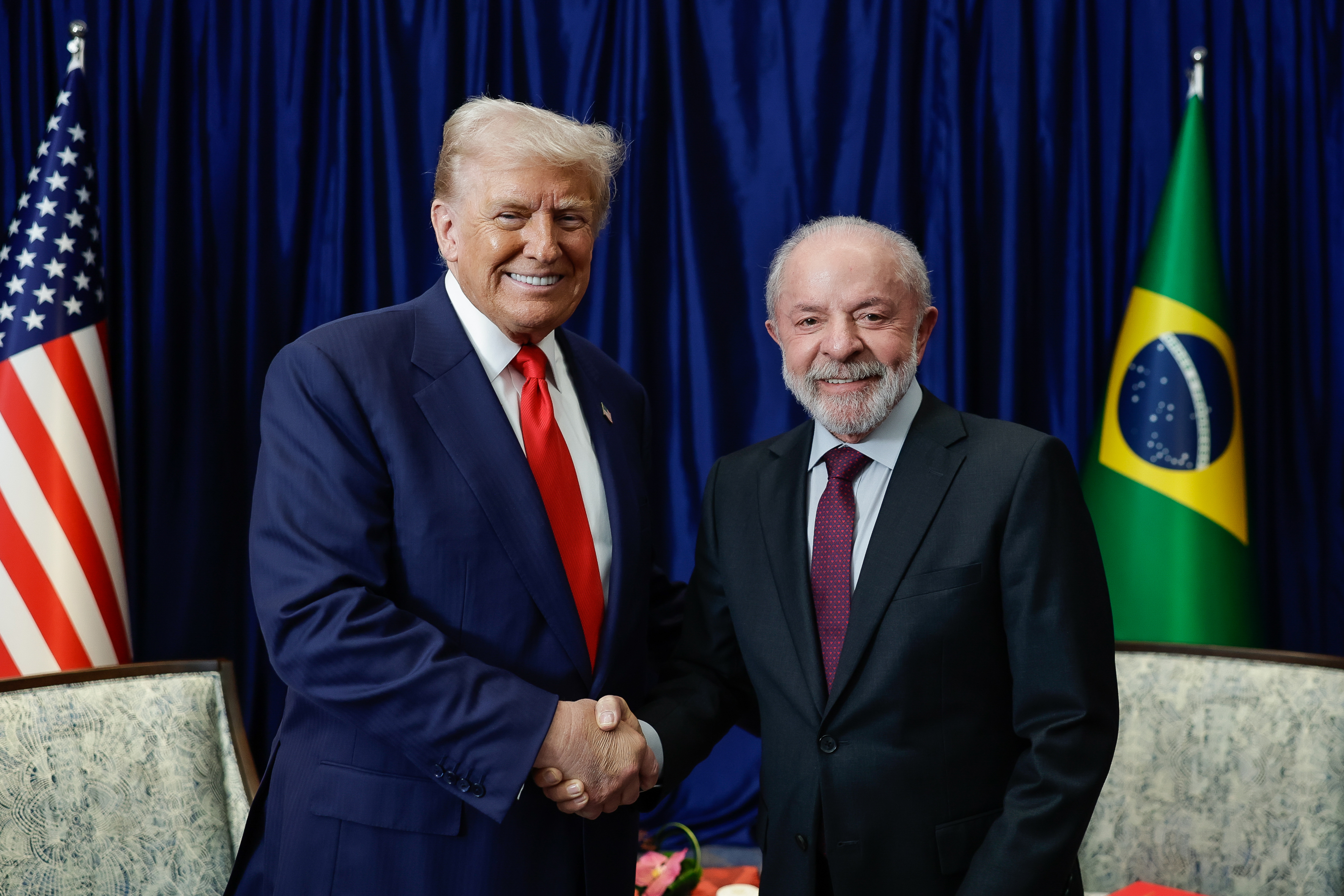
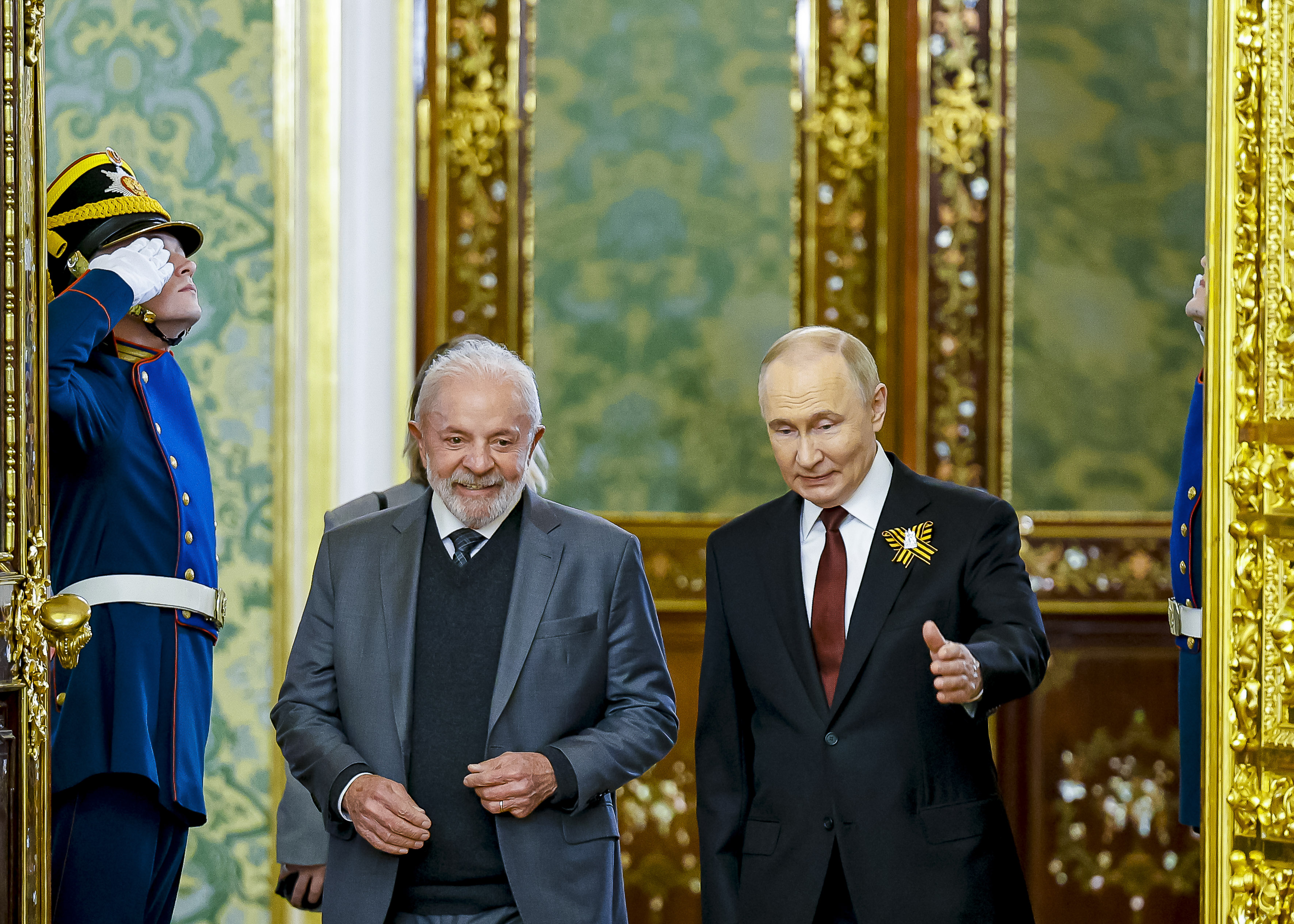
President Lula with Xi Jinping, Donald Trump and Vladimir Putin

No.	Country	Areas visited	Dates	Details
25	Uruguay	Montevideo	28 February – 1 March	Attended the inauguration ceremony of the president-elect Yamandu Orsi.
26	Japan	Imperial Palace, Tokyo	22–26 March	Met with Emperor Naruhito and Empress consort Masako. Gala dinner between Brazilian and Japanese officials with the Imperial family of Japan. Met with Prime Minister Shigeru Ishiba.
26	Vietnam	Hanoi	27–29 March	Met with General Secretary of the Communist Party of Vietnam Tô Lâm, President Lương Cường, Prime Minister Phạm Minh Chính and Chairman of the National Assembly Trần Thanh Mẫn.
27	Honduras	Tegucigalpa	8–9 April	Attended the 9th CELAC summit.
28	Vatican	St. Peter's Basilica, Vatican City	24–26 April	Attended the Funeral of Pope Francis.
29	Russia	Moscow	6–10 May	Attended the celebrations of the Victory Day. Met with President Vladimir Putin.
29	China	Beijing	10–13 May	Met with President, General Secretary of the Chinese Communist Party Xi Jinping.
30	Uruguay	Montevideo	15 May	Attended the Funeral of José Mujica.
31	France	Paris, Nice, Lyon	3–9 June	Met with President Emmanuel Macron. Awarded by the Académie Française and as Doctor Honoris Causa by the Paris 8 University. Visited the Interpol HQ and the Grand Palais. Attended the United Nations Ocean Conference.
31	Monaco	Monaco City	8 June	Met with Prince Albert II. Attended the Blue Economy and Finance Forum.
32	Canada	Kananaskis	16–17 June	Attended the 51st G7 summit. Met with Canadian prime minister Mark Carney and South Korean president Lee Jae Myung.
33	Argentina	Buenos Aires	3 July	Attended the Mercosur summit.
34	Chile	Santiago	21 July	Met with President Gabriel Boric.
35	Colombia	Bogotá	22 August	Attended the Amazon summit.
36	United States	New York City	21–24 September	Attended the 80th United Nations General Assembly. Met with Ukrainian president Volodymyr Zelenskyy, Swedish King Carl XVI Gustaf and Queen consort Silvia and Peruvian president Dina Boluarte.
37	Italy	Rome	12–14 October	Attended the 2025 FAO's State of World Fisheries and Aquaculture meeting.
37	Vatican	Vatican City	13 October	Met with Pope Leo XIV at the Apostolic Palace.
38	Indonesia	Jakarta	22–23 October	Met with President Prabowo Subianto.
38	Malaysia	Kuala Lumpur	24–27 October	Attended the ASEAN summit. Met with US president Donald Trump, Malaysian prime minister Anwar Ibrahim, South African president Cyril Ramaphosa, Singaporean prime minister Lawrence Wong and Vitenamese prime minister Phạm Minh Chính. Awarded Doctor Honoris Causa by the National University of Malaysia.
39	Colombia	Santa Marta	9 November	Attended the CELAC summit.
40	South Africa	Johannesburg	20–23 November	Attended the 20th G20 summit. Met with South African president Cyril Ramaphosa, German chancellor Friedrich Merz, Turkish president Recep Tayyip Erdoğan, Indian prime minister Narendra Modi and South Korean president Lee Jae Myung.
40	Mozambique	Maputo	24 November	Met with President Daniel Chapo. Awarded Doctor Honoris Causa by the Maputo University.

=== 2026 ===
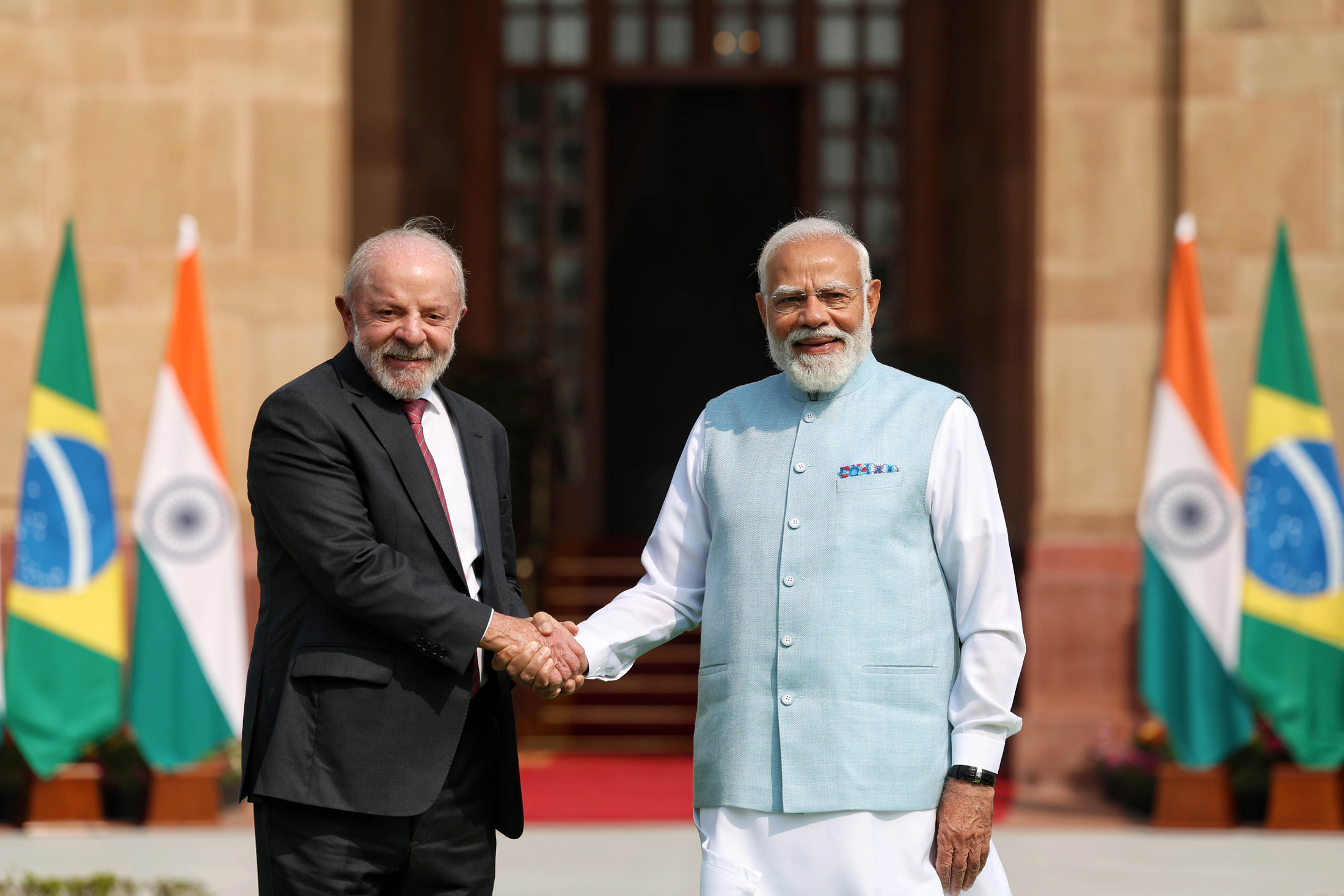
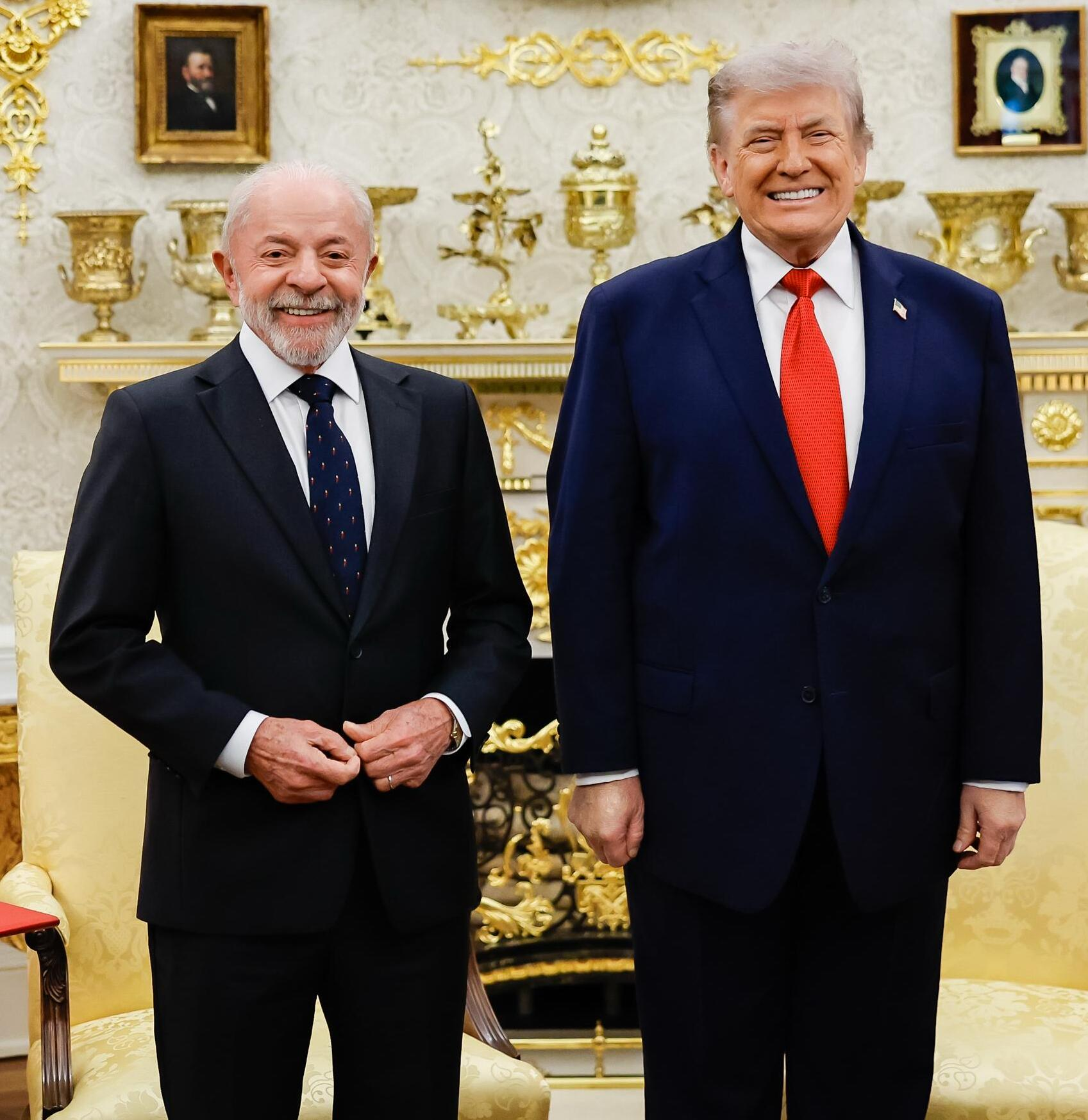
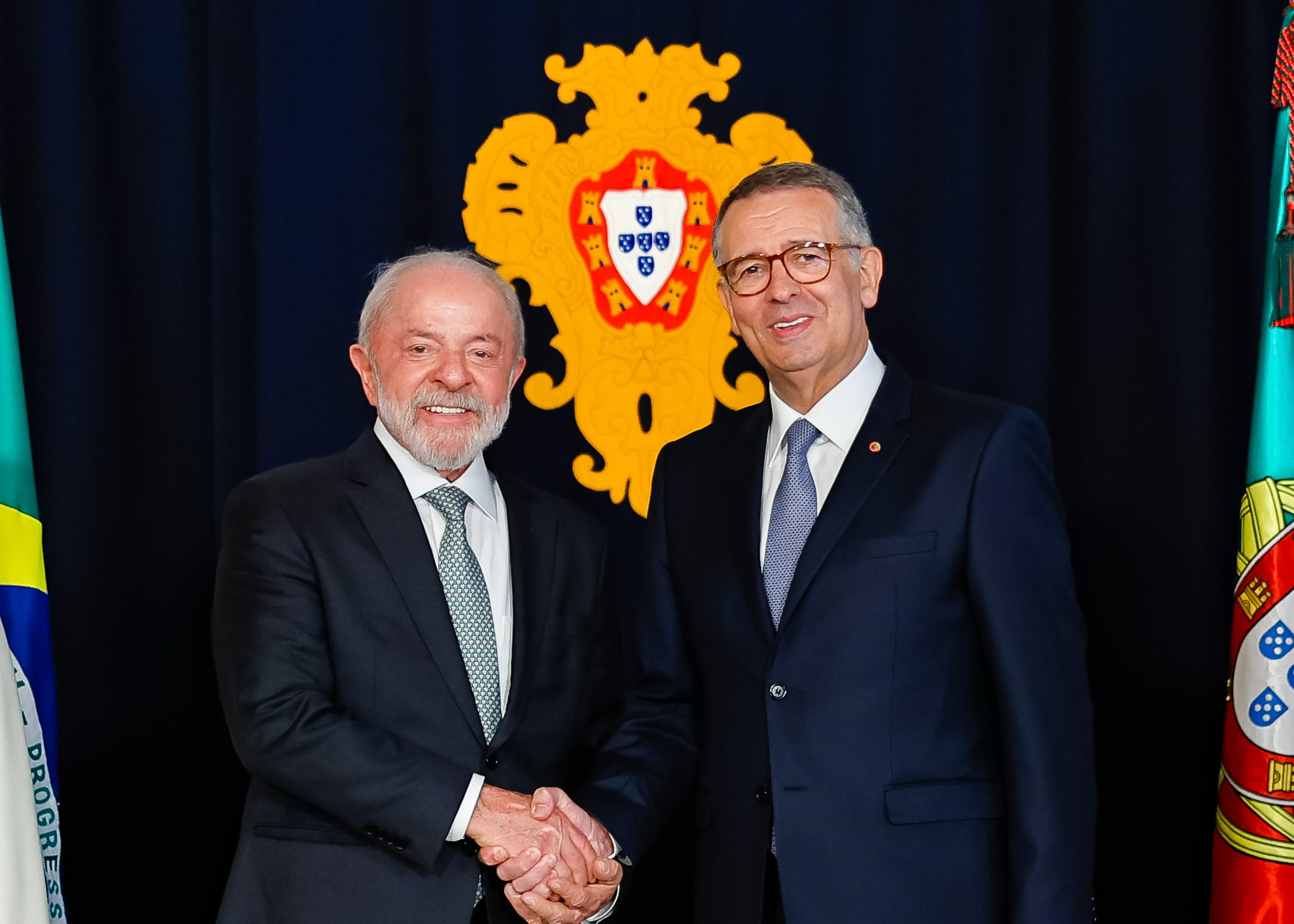
President Lula with Narendra Modi, Donald Trump and António José Seguro

No.	Country	Areas visited	Dates	Details
41	Panama	Panama City	27–28 January	Attended the Latin America and Caribbean Economic Forum. Met with President José Raúl Mulino.
42	India	New Delhi	18–22 February	Met with Prime Minister Narendra Modi. Attended the AI Impact Summit and met with Sri Lankan president Anura Kumara Dissanayake, Croatian prime minister Andrej Plenković and French president Emmanuel Macron.
42	South Korea	Seoul	22–24 February	Met with President Lee Jae Myung.
42	United Arab Emirates	Abu Dhabi	24 February	Meeting with Sheikh Mohammed bin Zayed Al Nahyan.
43	Colombia	Bogotá	21 March	Attended the CELAC summit.
44	Spain	Barcelona	17–18 April	Met with Prime Minister Pedro Sánchez and atteneded the 4th Forum for the Defense of Democracy.
44	Germany	Hannover	19–20 April	Met with Chancellor Friedrich Merz. attended the Hannover Messe.
44	Portugal	Lisbon	21 April	Hold meetings with Prime Minister Luís Montenegro and President António José Seguro.
45	United States	Washington	6–7 May	Met with President Donald Trump.
46	Switzerland	Geneva	15 June	Met with Swiss president Guy Parmelin.
46	France	Évian-les-Bains	15–17 June	Attended the 52nd G7 summit. Held bilateral meetings with French president Emmanuel Macron, Japanese prime minister Sanae Takaichi, and Ukrainian president Volodymyr Zelenskyy.
47	Paraguay	Asunción	30 June	Attended the 68th Mercosur summit.
48	United States	New York City	20–22 September	Attended the 81st United Nations General Assembly. Met with U.S Senator Bernie Sanders, New York City Mayor Zohran Mamdani, and Uruguayan President Yamandú Orsi.
49	Turkey	Antalya	10–13 November	Attended the 2026 United Nations Climate Change Conference.
49	Philippines	Manila	13–15 November	State visit. Met with President Bongbong Marcos. Attended the 49th ASEAN Summit as a guest invitee. First sitting President of Brazil to visit the Philippines.
49	Spain	Madrid	15–16 November	Met with Prime Minister Pedro Sánchez at the Palace of Moncloa.
49	Cape Verde	Praia	16 November	Met with President José Maria Neves.

== Future trips ==
The following international trips are scheduled to be made by Lula:

Country	Areas visited	Dates	Details
Uruguay	Montevideo	4–5 December	Will attend the 69th Mercosur summit.
United States	Miami	14–15 December	Will attend the 21st G20 summit.

== Multilateral meetings ==
Multilateral meetings of the following intergovernmental organizations that Brazil is a member of (or invited to) that took place, or are scheduled to take place, during Lula's term in office.

Group	Year			
Group	2023	2024	2025	2026
BRICS	22–24 August, (South Africa) Johannesburg	22–24 October, (Russia) Kazan (Note: The President cancelled his trip to Russia on October 20, due to medical orientation. Minister Mauro Vieira attended in the President's place.)	6–7 July, (Brazil) Rio de Janeiro	12–13 September, (India) New Delhi
G20	9–10 September, (India) New Delhi	18–19 November, (Brazil) Rio de Janeiro	22–23 November, (South Africa) Johannesburg	14–15 December, (United States) Miami
UNCCC	30 November – 12 December, (United Arab Emirates) Dubai	11–24 November, (Azerbaijan) Baku	10–21 November, (Brazil) Belém	9–20 November, (Turkey) Antalya
CELAC	24 January, (Argentina) Buenos Aires	1 March, (Saint Vincent and the Grenadines) Kingstown	9 April, (Honduras) Tegucigalpa	21 March, (Colombia) Medellín
Others	G7 summit 19–21 May, (Japan) Hiroshima	G7 summit 13–15 June, (Italy) Fasano	G7 summit 16–17 June, (Canada) Kananaskis	G7 summit 15–17 June, (France) Évian-les-Bains
Others	G7 summit 19–21 May, (Japan) Hiroshima	G7 summit 13–15 June, (Italy) Fasano	ASEAN Summit; 26–28 October, (Malaysia) Kuala Lumpur	ASEAN Summit; 16–18 November, (Philippines) Pasay
██ = Future event ██ = Did not attend / participate

== See also ==
- List of international presidential trips made by Dilma Rousseff, his successor after his First presidency
- List of international presidential trips made by Jair Bolsonaro, his predecessor before his Second presidency
