= 9th G-15 summit =

- Host country: Jamaica
- Date: 10–12 February 1999

The 9th G-15 summit was held at Montego Bay in Jamaica on 10–12 February 1999.

The summit agenda of the Group of 15 (G-15) encompassed a range of issues.

The gathering brought together leaders, representatives and policymakers from non-aligned nations. African G-15 nations are Algeria, Egypt, Kenya, Nigeria, Senegal, and Zimbabwe. Those from Asia are India, Indonesia, Iran, Malaysia, and Sri Lanka. Latin American G-15 nations include Argentina, Brazil, Chile, Jamaica, Mexico, Peru and Venezuela.

== Overview ==
The Group of 15 was established at the Ninth Non-Aligned Movement summit in Belgrade, Yugoslavia in September 1989.

The G-15 is composed of countries from Africa, Asia, North America and South America. These non-aligned nations joined together to create a forum to foster cooperation and develop information which can be presented to other international groups, such as the World Trade Organization and the Group of Eight. The G-15 nations have a common goal of enhanced growth and prosperity. The group aims to encourage cooperation among developing countries in the areas of investment, trade, and technology.

== Leaders at the summit ==
Those G-15 nations represented at the summit were Algeria, Argentina, Brazil, Chile, Egypt, India, Indonesia, Iran, Jamaica, Kenya, Malaysia, Mexico, Nigeria, Peru, Senegal, Sri Lanka, Venezuela, and Zimbabwe. The group's membership has expanded to 17 countries, but the name has remained unchanged.

The leaders of G-15 nations are core contributors in summit meetings. but only some of the heads-of-state were at the Caracas event:

- India - Atal Behari Vajpayee, Prime Minister
- Jamaica - Percival James Patterson, Prime Minister
- Malaysia - Mahathir Mohamad, Prime Minister
- Nigeria - Abdulsalami Abubakar, President
- Senegal - Abdou Diouf, President
- Sri Lanka, Sirimavo Ratwatte Dias Bandaranaike, Prime Minister
- Venezuela - Hugo Chávez, President.
- Zimbabwe - Robert Gabriel Mugabe, President

== Priorities ==
The G-15 nations perceive an ongoing need to expand dialogue with the G8 nations. The G-15 want to help bridge the gap between developing countries and the more developed and industrialized nations.

== Issues ==
G-15 nations are united by shared perceptions of global economic issues; and the G-15 provides a structure for developing common strategies for dealing with these issues.

G15 nations have joined together in hopes of escaping from the more polemical atmosphere in other multinational groups and organizations, such as the Group of 77 (G-77).

Within the G-15, Argentina, Brazil and Mexico did not support the confrontationist posture which was adopted by Malaysia.

== Notes ==
Preceded by 8th G-15 summit	9th G-15 summit 1999; Montego Bay	Succeeded by 10th G-15 summit
