= 15th G-15 summit =

15th G-15 Summit
- Host country: Sri Lanka
- Dates: 2012

The Fifteenth G15 summit was held in Colombo, Sri Lanka in 2012.

The bi-annual summit agenda of the Group of 15 (G-15) encompasses a range of issues.

The gathering brings together leaders, representatives and policymakers from non-aligned nations. African G-15 nations are Algeria, Egypt, Kenya, Nigeria, Senegal, and Zimbabwe. Those from Asia are India, Indonesia, Iran, Malaysia, and Sri Lanka. Latin American G-15 nations include Argentina, Brazil, Chile, Jamaica, Mexico, Peru and Venezuela.

== Overview ==
The Group of 15 was established at the Ninth Non-Aligned Movement summit in Belgrade, Yugoslavia in September 1989. The name of the group is unchanging, but its composition has expanded to 18 countries.

The G-15 is composed of countries from Africa, Asia, North America and South America. These non-aligned nations joined to create a forum to foster cooperation and develop information which can be presented to other international groups, such as the World Trade Organization and the Group of Eight rich industrialized nations. The G-15 nations have a common goal of enhanced growth and prosperity. The group aims to encourage cooperation among developing countries in the areas of investment, trade, and technology.

== Leaders at the summit ==
Those nations expected to be represented at the summit are Algeria, Argentina, Brazil, Chile, Egypt, India, Indonesia, Iran, Jamaica, Kenya, Malaysia, Mexico, Nigeria, Peru, Senegal, Sri Lanka, Venezuela, and Zimbabwe. The G-15 membership has expanded to 18 countries, but the name has remained unchanged.

The leaders of G-15 nations are core contributors in summit meetings, but not all of the heads-of-state are expected to attend the Colombo event:

- Sri Lanka - President

== Priorities ==
The G-15 nations perceive an ongoing need to expand dialogue with the G8 and with the G20. The G-15 want to help bridge the gap between developing countries and the more developed and industrialized nations. The fact that some of the G-15 are simultaneously members of these other forums is expected to be helpful. At the Tehran summit of 2010, the President of Sri Lankan emphasized the importance of cooperation with the G8 on all major aspects of development.

== Issues ==
G-15 nations are united by shared perceptions of global economic issues; and the G-15 provides a structure for working out common strategies for dealing with these issues. For example, the G-15 opposes using the international economic and financial systems as political instruments.

G-15 nations have joined in hopes of escaping from the more polemical atmosphere in other multi-national groups and organizations, such as the Group of 77 (G-77). For example, the 14th G-15 summit called for reform of Bretton Woods institutions and examining alternate sources of financing for the developing world.

== Schedule and Agenda ==
The summit provides an opportunity to focus on the importance of cooperation in facing the current challenges of food, energy, climate change, health and trade.

The chairmanship of the G-15 passed to Sri Lanka at the end of the 14th G-15 summit.

== See also ==
- Group of 15

== Notes ==
| Preceded by 14th G-15 summit | 15th G-15 summit 2012; Colombo | Succeeded by 16th G-15 summit |
