= Group of 15 =

Informal forum

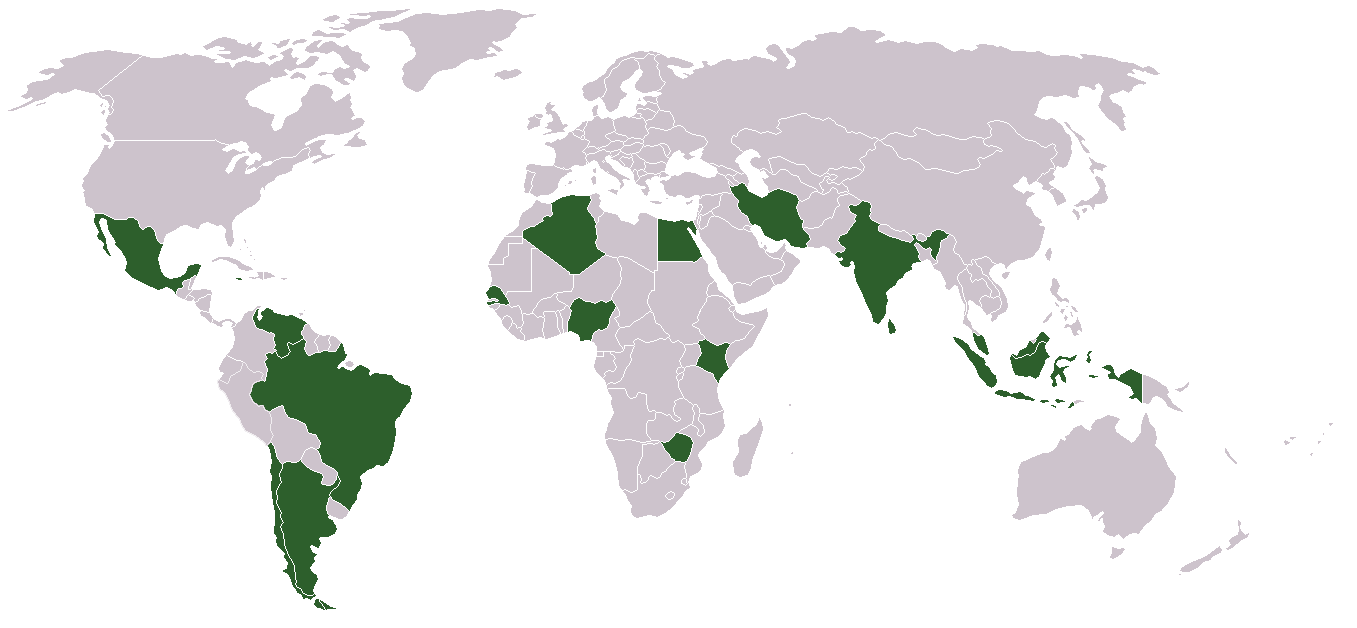
- Members of G-15
- Formation: September 1989; 1990 (Summit)
- Purpose: Act as a catalyst for greater cooperation between leading developing countries.
- Location: Geneva, Switzerland
- Members: List: Algeria Argentina Brazil Chile Egypt India Indonesia Iran Jamaica Kenya Malaysia Mexico Nigeria Senegal Sri Lanka Venezuela Zimbabwe
- G-15 Chair: Sri Lanka, As of 2017
- Website: www.g15.org

The Group of 15 (G-15) is an informal forum set up to foster cooperation and provide input for other international groups, such as the World Trade Organization (WTO) and the Group of Seven. It was established at the Ninth Non-Aligned Movement Summit Meeting in Belgrade, Yugoslavia, in September 1989, and is composed of countries from Latin America, Africa, and Asia with a common goal of enhanced growth and prosperity. The G-15 focuses on cooperation among developing countries in the areas of investment, trade, and technology. Chile, Iran and Kenya have since joined the Group of 15, whereas Yugoslavia is no longer part of the group, and Peru, a founding member-state, decided to leave the G-15 in 2011. Membership thus has since expanded to 17 countries, but the forum's name remains unchanged.

== Structure and activities ==
Some of the objectives of the G-15 are:

- To harness the considerable potential for greater and mutually beneficial cooperation among developing countries
- To conduct a regular review of the impact of the world situation and of the state of international economic relations on developing countries
- To serve as a forum for regular consultations among developing countries with a view to coordinate policies and actions
- To identify and implement new and concrete schemes for South-South cooperation and mobilize wider support for them
- To pursue a more positive and productive North-South dialogue and to find new ways of dealing with problems in a cooperative, constructive and mutually supportive manner.

By design, the G-15 has avoided establishing an administrative structure like those for international organizations, such as the United Nations or the World Bank; but the G-15 does have a Technical Support Facility (TSF) located in Geneva. The TSF functions under the direction of the Chairman for the current year. The TSF provides necessary support for the activities of the G-15 and for its objectives. Other organs and functions of the G-15 include:

- Summit of heads of state and government: The G-15's summit is organized biennially, with the venue being rotated among the three developing regions of the G-15 membership.
- Annual meetings of Ministers of Foreign Affairs: G-15 Ministers of Foreign Affairs typically meet once a year to coordinate group activities and to prepare for the nest summit of G-15 leaders.
- Steering committee (Troika): A steering committee, or Troika, is composed of three foreign ministers, one from the preceding summit host country, the present host country and the anticipated next host countries. These three are responsible for oversight and coordination.
- Personal representatives of heads of state and government: Each member country is represented by personal representatives of heads of state and government who meet regularly in Geneva.

In addition, the Federation of Chambers of Commerce, Industry and Services (FCCIS) is a private sector forum of G-15 member countries. The purpose of the FCCIS is to coordinate and maximize efforts which promote business, economic development and joint investment in G-15 nations.

In 2010, the chairmanship of the G-15 was accepted by Sri Lanka at the conclusion of the 14th G-15 summit in Tehran.

== Member countries and organizations ==
World Bank (2023)

Region	Member	Leader		Foreign minister		Population	GDP (PPP, billion USD)	GDP per capita (PPP, USD)
Africa	Algeria	President	Abdelmadjid Tebboune	Minister of Foreign Affairs	Ahmed Attaf	45,295,169	263.7	5821.8
Africa	Egypt	President	Abdel Fattah el-Sisi	Minister of Foreign Affairs	Badr Abdelatty	111,929,759	2,370	21,668
Africa	Kenya	President	William Ruto	Minister of Foreign Affairs	Musalia Mudavadi	57,092,313	401.4	7,534
Africa	Nigeria	President	Bola Tinubu	Minister of Foreign Affairs	Yusuf Tuggar	235,598,090	1,565	6,706
Africa	Senegal	President	Bassirou Diomaye Faye	Minister of Foreign Affairs	Yassine Fall	18,759,358	31.01	4,869
Africa	Zimbabwe	President	Emmerson Mnangagwa	Minister of Foreign Affairs	Frederick Shava	16,505,473	26.54	1,592.42
Asia	India	Prime Minister	Narendra Modi	Minister of External Affairs	S. Jaishankar	1,422,652,968	10257.8	7333
Asia	Indonesia	President	Prabowo Subianto	Minister of Foreign Affairs	Sugiono	276,495,976	1124.6	10,585.4
Asia	Iran	President	Masoud Pezeshkian	Minister of Foreign Affairs	Abbas Araghchi	88,875,750	990.2	13,053
Asia	Malaysia	Prime Minister	Anwar Ibrahim	Minister of Foreign Affairs	Mohamad Hasan	34,124,881	447.3	15,568
Asia	Sri Lanka	President	Anura Kumara Dissanayake	Minister of External Affairs	Vijitha Herath	21,867,876	116.5	5,674
Latin America and the Caribbean	Argentina	President	Javier Milei	Minister of Foreign Affairs, International Trade and Worship	Gerardo Werthein	45,643,940	816.4	17,516
Latin America and the Caribbean	Brazil	President	Luiz Inácio Lula da Silva	Minister of Foreign Affairs	Mauro Vieira	215,861,260	3294.2	11,769
Latin America and the Caribbean	Chile	President	Gabriel Boric	Minister of Foreign Affairs	Alberto van Klaveren	19,616,738	299.6	17,222
Latin America and the Caribbean	Jamaica	Prime Minister	Andrew Holness	Minister of Foreign Affairs and Foreign Trade	Kamina Johnson-Smith	2,825,544	24.8	9,029
Latin America and the Caribbean	Mexico	President	Claudia Sheinbaum	Secretary of Foreign Affairs	Juan Ramón de la Fuente	128,028,612	2999.6	14,610
Latin America and the Caribbean	Venezuela	President	Nicolás Maduro	Minister of Foreign Affairs	Yván Gil	28,582,898	374.1	12,568

== G-15 Summits ==
	Date	Host country	Host city	Host
1st G-15 summit	1–3 June 1990	Malaysia	Kuala Lumpur	Mahathir Mohamad
2nd G-15 summit	27–29 November 1991	Venezuela	Caracas	Carlos Andrés Pérez
3rd G-15 summit	21–23 November 1992	Senegal	Dakar	Abdou Diouf
4th G-15 summit	1994	India	New Delhi	P. V. Narasimha Rao
5th G-15 summit	5–7 November 1995	Argentina	Buenos Aires	Carlos Menem
6th G-15 summit	3–5 November 1996	Zimbabwe	Harare	Robert Mugabe
7th G-15 summit	28 October – 5 November 1997	Malaysia	Kuala Lumpur	Mahathir Mohamad
8th G-15 summit	11–13 May 1998	Egypt	Cairo	Hosni Mubarak
9th G-15 summit	10–12 February 1999	Jamaica	Montego Bay	P. J. Patterson
10th G-15 summit	19–20 June 2000	Egypt	Cairo	Hosni Mubarak
11th G-15 summit	30–31 May 2001	Indonesia	Jakarta	Abdurrahman Wahid
12th G-15 summit	27–28 February 2004	Venezuela	Caracas	Hugo Chávez
13th G-15 summit	14 September 2006	Cuba	Havana	Raúl Castro
14th G-15 summit	15-17 May 2010	Iran	Tehran	Mahmoud Ahmadinejad
15th G-15 summit	2012	Sri Lanka	Colombo	Mahinda Rajapaksa

== See also ==
- Global System of Trade Preferences among Developing Countries (GSTP)
