= 13th G-15 summit =

- Host country: Cuba
- Dates: September 14, 2006

The Thirteenth G-15 summit was held in Havana, Cuba on September 14, 2006. The group's meeting was coordinated to take place at the same time as a non-aligned summit of 116 developing nations in the Cuban capital.

The summit agenda of the Group of 15 (G-15) encompassed a range of issues. The summit theme was "Rural and Agricultural Development and the Management of Water Resources."

The gathering brought together leaders, representatives and policymakers from non-aligned nations. African G-15 nations are Algeria, Egypt, Kenya, Nigeria, Senegal, and Zimbabwe. Those from Asia are India, Indonesia, Iran, Malaysia, and Sri Lanka. Latin American G-15 nations include Argentina, Brazil, Chile, Jamaica, Mexico, Peru and Venezuela.

== Overview ==
The Group of 15 was established at the Ninth Non-Aligned Movement summit in Belgrade, Yugoslavia in September 1989.

The G-15 is composed of countries from Africa, Asia, North America and South America. These non-aligned nations joined together to create a forum to foster cooperation and develop information which can be presented to other international groups, such as the World Trade Organization and the Group of Eight. The G-15 nations have a common goal of enhanced growth and prosperity. The group aims to encourage cooperation among developing countries in the areas of investment, trade, and technology.

== Leaders at the summit ==
Those G-15 nations represented at the summit were Algeria, Argentina, Brazil, Chile, Egypt, India, Indonesia, Iran, Jamaica, Kenya, Malaysia, Mexico, Nigeria, Peru, Senegal, Sri Lanka, Venezuela, and Zimbabwe. The group's membership has expanded to more than 15 countries, but the name has remained unchanged.

The leaders of G-15 nations are core contributors in summit meetings. but only some of the heads-of-state were at the Havana event:

- Algeria - President Abdelaziz Bouteflika
- Iran - President Mahmud Ahmadinejad
- Malaysia - Prime Minister Abdullah Ahmad Badawi
- Venezuela - President Hugo Chavez
- Kenya - Kenya was represented by Vice President Moody Awori.

=== Guest participants ===
- Cuba was represented by the President of the Council of State of Cuba, Raúl Castro.

== Priorities ==
The G-15 nations perceive an ongoing need to expand dialogue with the G8 nations. The G-15 want to help bridge the gap between developing countries and the more developed and industrialized nations. For example, the G-15 converted this venue into an opportunity to express concern about the delays and limited progress in achieving the Millennium Development Goals.

== Issues ==
G-15 nations are united by shared perceptions of global economic issues; and the G-15 provides a structure for developing common strategies for dealing with these issues. For example, the G15 nations oppose using the international economic and financial systems as political instruments.

G15 nations have joined together in hopes of escaping from the more polemical atmosphere in other multinational groups and organizations, such as the Group of 77 (G-77). For example, the 14th G-15 summit called for reform of Bretton Woods institutions and financing for the developing world.

== Schedule and agenda ==
The summit provides an opportunity to focus on the importance of cooperation in facing challenges of food, energy, climate change, health and trade.

The chairmanship of the G-15 passed from Algeria to Iran at the end of the summit; and Iran will host the next scheduled group meeting in Tehran, the 14th G-15 summit in 2010.

== Notes ==
Preceded by 12th G-15 summit	13th G-15 summit 2006; Havana	Succeeded by 14th G-15 summit
