= 14th G-15 summit =

14th G-15 Summit
- Host country: Iran
- Dates: May 15–17, 2010

The Fourteenth G-15 summit was held in Tehran, Iran on May 17–20, 2010. The bi-annual summit agenda of the Group of 15 (G-15) encompassed a range of issues.

The gathering brought together leaders, representatives and policymakers from non-aligned nations. African G-15 nations are Algeria, Egypt, Kenya, Nigeria, Senegal, and Zimbabwe. Those from Asia are India, Indonesia, Iran, Malaysia, and Sri Lanka. Latin American G-15 nations include Argentina, Brazil, Chile, Jamaica, Mexico, Peru and Venezuela.

== Overview ==
The Group of 15 was established at the Ninth Non-Aligned Movement summit in Belgrade, Yugoslavia in September 1989. The name of this group is unchanging, but its composition has expanded to 18 countries.

The G-15 is composed of countries from Africa, Asia, North America and South America. These non-aligned nations joined to create a forum to foster cooperation and develop information which can be presented to other international groups, such as the World Trade Organization and the Group of Eight. The G-15 nations have a common goal of enhanced growth and prosperity. The group aims to encourage cooperation among developing countries in the areas of investment, trade, and technology.

Meeting independently in Tehran, ministers from Brazil, Iran and Turkey negotiated an agreement on principles designed to revive a stalled nuclear fuel-swap deal backed by the United Nations.

== Leaders at the summit ==
Those nations represented at the summit were Algeria, Argentina, Brazil, Chile, Egypt, India, Indonesia, Iran, Jamaica, Kenya, Malaysia, Mexico, Nigeria, Peru, Senegal, Sri Lanka, Venezuela, and Zimbabwe. The G-15 membership has expanded to 18 countries, but the name has remained unchanged.

The leaders of G-15 nations are core contributors in summit meetings, but only some of the heads-of-state were at the Teheran event:

Government leaders
Algeria	President	Abdelaziz Bouteflika
Brazil	President	Luiz Inácio Lula da Silva
Iran	President	Mahmoud Ahmadinejad
Senegal	President	Abdoulaye Wade
Sri Lanka	President	Mahinda Rajapakse
Turkey	Prime Minister	Recep Tayyip Erdogan
Zimbabwe	President	Robert Mugabe
Argentina	represented by its permanent representative in Geneva	
Chile	represented by the president's special envoy	
Egypt	represented by the Minister of Investment	
India	represented by its Foreign Minister.	
Indonesia	represented by the president's special envoy and the Minister of Industries	
Kenya	Vice-president	Kalonzo Musyoka
Malaysia	represented by the Deputy Minister of Finance	
Mexico	represented by its Ambassador to Iran	
Nigeria	represented by its Foreign Minister	

=== Guest participants ===
- Belarus was represented by its deputy Vice-president The Russian ambassador to Iran was in attendance.

== Priorities ==
The G-15 perceive an ongoing need to expand dialogue with the G8 and with the G20. The G-15 want to help bridge the gap between developing countries and the more developed and industrialized nations. The fact that some of the G-15 are simultaneously members of these other forums is expected to be helpful.

== Issues ==
G-15 nations are united by shared perceptions of global economic issues; and the G-15 provides a structure for working out common strategies for dealing with these issues. For example, the G-15 opposes using the international economic and financial systems as political instruments. The group condemns the use of coercive economic measures or laws against developing countries.

G-15 nations have joined in hopes of escaping from the more polemical atmosphere in other multi-national groups and organizations, such as the Group of 77 (G-77). For example, the 14th G-15 summit called for reform of Bretton Woods institutions and examining alternate sources of financing for the developing world.

== Schedule and Agenda ==
The summit was a venue for three-way talks between Turkish Prime Minister Erdogan and Brazilian President Lula da Silva and Iranian President Ahmadinejad. Their negotiations led to the announcement of a program of exchange in Turkey of Iran's low-enriched uranium for nuclear fuel processed abroad. The announcement of a diplomatic break-through was met with scepticism in Western capitals.

The summit focused on the importance of cooperation in facing the current challenges of food, energy, climate change, health and trade. The G-15 agenda included discussions of the Doha Round, intellectual properties and the 2008 financial crisis.

The chairmanship of the G-15 passed from Iran to Sri Lanka at the end of the summit; and Sri Lanka will host the next scheduled group meeting in Colombo, the 15th G-15 summit in 2012.

== See also ==
- Group of 15

== Notes ==
Preceded by 13th G-15 summit	14th G-15 summit 2010; Tehran	Succeeded by 15th G-15 summit
