= 12th G-15 summit =

- Host country: Venezuela
- Dates: September 27–28, 2004

The Twelfth G-15 summit was held in Caracas, Venezuela on February 27–28, 2004.

The summit agenda of the Group of 15 (G-15) encompassed a range of issues. The summit theme was "Energy and Development."

The gathering brought together leaders, representatives and policymakers from non-aligned nations. African G-15 nations are Algeria, Egypt, Kenya, Nigeria, Senegal, and Zimbabwe. Those from Asia are India, Indonesia, Iran, Malaysia, and Sri Lanka. Latin American G-15 nations include Argentina, Brazil, Chile, Jamaica, Mexico, Peru and Venezuela.

== Overview ==
The Group of 15 was established at the Ninth Non-Aligned Movement summit in Belgrade, Yugoslavia in September 1989. The name of the group is unchanging, but its composition has expanded to 18 countries.

The G-15 is composed of countries from Africa, Asia, North America and South America. These non-aligned nations joined together to create a forum to foster cooperation and develop information which can be presented to other international groups, such as the World Trade Organization and the Group of Eight. The G-15 nations have a common goal of enhanced growth and prosperity. The group aims to encourage cooperation among developing countries in the areas of investment, trade, and technology.

== Leaders at the summit ==
Those G-15 nations represented at the summit were Algeria, Argentina, Brazil, Chile, Egypt, India, Indonesia, Iran, Jamaica, Kenya, Malaysia, Mexico, Nigeria, Peru, Senegal, Sri Lanka, Venezuela, and Zimbabwe. The group's membership has expanded to 18 countries, but the name has remained unchanged.

The leaders of G-15 nations are core contributors in summit meetings. but only some of the heads-of-state were at the Caracas event:

- Argentina – Néstor Kirchner, President.
- Brazil – Luiz Inácio Lula da Silva, President.
- Colombia – Álvaro Uribe, President.
- Iran – Mohammed Khatami, President.
- Jamaica – Percival James Patterson, Prime Minister.
- Venezuela – Hugo Chávez, President.
- Zimbabwe – Robert Gabriel Mugabe, President
- Indonesia – Indonesia was represented by Foreign Minister Hassan Wirajuda.

=== Guest participants ===
The Group of 77 was represented by Nassir Abdulaziz Al-Nasser of Qatar. United Nations Conference on Trade and Development (UNCTAD) Secretary General Rubens Ricupero attended the summit.

== Priorities ==
The G-15 nations perceive an ongoing need to expand dialogue with the G8 nations. The G-15 want to help bridge the gap between developing countries and the more developed and industrialized nations. For example, the G-15 converted this venue into an opportunity to express concern about the delays and limited progress in achieving the Millennium Development Goals.

== Issues ==
G-15 nations are united by shared perceptions of global economic issues; and the G-15 provides a structure for developing common strategies for dealing with these issues.

G15 nations have joined together in hopes of escaping from the more polemical atmosphere in other multinational groups and organizations, such as the Group of 77 (G-77).

== Schedule and agenda ==
The summit provides an opportunity to focus on the importance of cooperation in facing challenges of food, energy, climate change, health and trade. Delegations from 19 nations met to discuss energy cooperation between member states and fighting poverty.

Following bilateral meetings between the Venezuelan and Iranian presidents, the Iranian President announced that US$700 million would be invested by Iran in Venezuela's state-owned aluminum industry and the corollary transfer of Venezuelan aluminum-processing technology to Iran.

Venezuelan President Hugo Chávez announced his intention to create an international television network that would present information and films created in the South. Telesur was launched the following year.

== Security ==
An estimated 11,000 soldiers and national guards were deployed in security operations for the summit. Violence broke out in the streets of Caracas. Clashes involving antigovernment demonstrators caused at least 2 deaths and 14 wounded by gunfire. Demonstrators tried to break a security perimeter established by the Venezuelan Army a kilometer away from where the G-15 leaders were meeting.

== Notes ==
| Preceded by 11th G-15 summit | 12th G-15 summit 2004; Caracas | Succeeded by 13th G-15 summit |
